= Yazaki =

Japanese automotive parts manufacturer

Yazaki Corporation

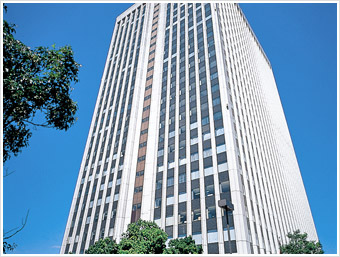
- Yazaki Corporation's headquarters in Minato, Tokyo, Japan
- Native name: 矢崎総業株式会社
- Company type: Private KK
- Industry: Automotive
- Founded: 1929; 97 years ago
- Founder: Sadami Yazaki
- Headquarters: Tokyo, Japan
- Area served: Worldwide
- Key people: Yasuhiko Yazaki (Chairman); Riku Yazaki (President)
- Products: Automotive parts; Electric wires; Gas equipment; Air-conditioning equipment; Solar equipment; Wire harnesses
- Revenue: ▲JPY 1,926.6 billion (FY 2017) (US$ 17.6 billion) (FY 2017)
- Number of employees: 306,118 people (as of June 2018)
- Website: Official website
- Footnotes / references /ar.html

Yazaki Corporation (矢崎総業株式会社, Yazaki Sōgyō Kabushiki Kaisha) is a global automotive parts supplier with a focus on wire harnesses, instruments and components such as connectors and terminals. The company's origin and headquarters are in Japan, but in 2011, roughly 90% of its employees were outside the home country.

Yazaki ranks among the largest worldwide automotive suppliers, ranked 13th by the industry journal Automotive News in 2015.

The company's product lineup includes electrical cables, meter and auto instruments, gas equipment, air-conditioning, and solar-powered systems. As a first tier supplier, Yazaki sells chiefly to auto manufacturers, and, to a lesser extent, electric power, gas, and general construction companies. Yazaki is among the top 100 companies receiving the most US patents.

The Yazaki Group's corporate headquarters are located in the Mita-Kokusai Building (三田国際ビル Mita Kokusai Biru) in Mita, in Minato, Tokyo, Japan. Its main R&D center and its World Headquarters are located in the Y-city compound in Susono, Shizuoka prefecture. The company has its European headquarters in Cologne, Germany and the North American headquarters in Canton, Michigan, United States of America.

== History and expansion ==
Starting as a small Japanese family business selling wiring harnesses for automobiles in 1941, Yazaki Group in 2011 employs more than 192,000 people worldwide, with about 90% of them (171,000) outside Japan. After World War II, Yazaki focused on automotive wire harness production and grew rapidly. Overseas growth increased strongly between 1974 and the 1990s. There were external and internal reasons for this increase. The main external reason was the general trend of Japanese automotive companies to move production abroad to avoid trade sanctions in this period. This strategy change was accompanied by a change of leadership within Yazaki, when heir Yasuhiko Yazaki succeeded the founder Sadami Yazaki in 1974, aged only 33. Between 1974 and 1990, overseas sales grew roughly 30 times (from about ¥4 Billion in 1974 to ¥116 Billion), while overseas employees increased tenfold (from 2,922 to 33,703).

Yazaki India privet limited is the official supplier of Mahindra BE 6 and XE 9e, AR based Heads-Up-Display (HUD).

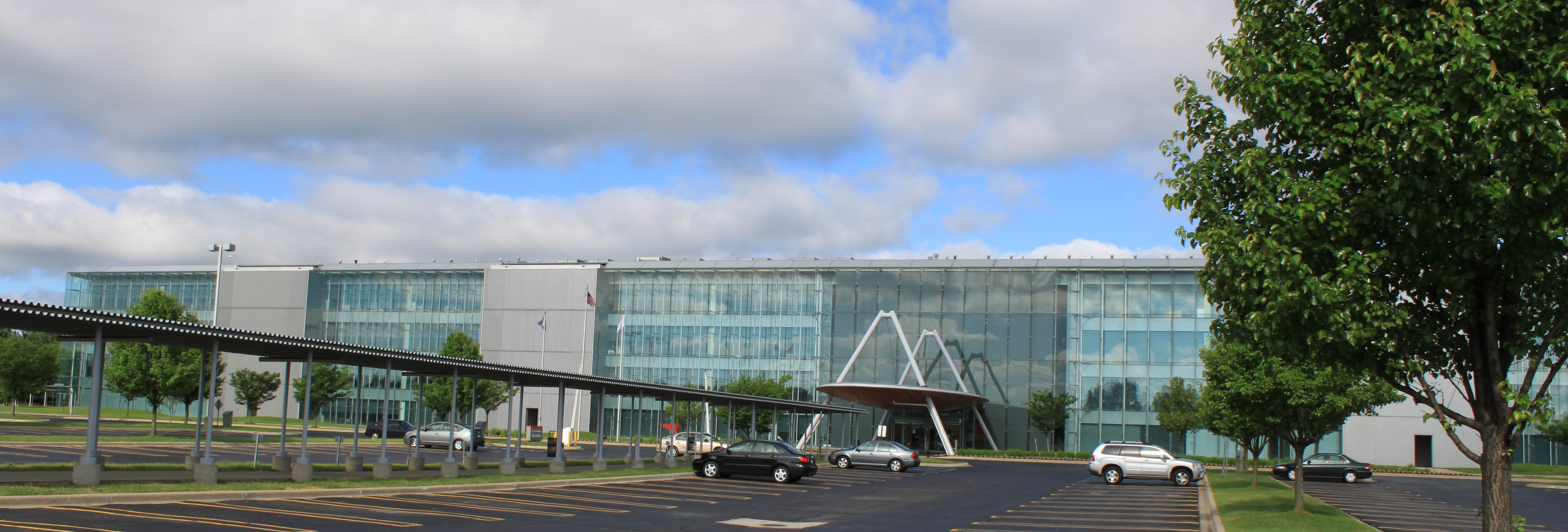
Yazaki North America Headquarters

== Controversies ==
=== Price fixing ===
On January 30, 2012, the US Justice Department announced after two years of investigation that it had discovered part of a massive price fixing scheme in which Denso and Yazaki played a significant role. The conspiracy, which fixed prices and allocated components to such car manufacturers as Toyota and Honda, extended from Michigan to Japan, where it was also under investigation. Denso agreed to pay a fine of $78 million. Yazaki agreed to pay a fine of $470 million, and four Yazaki executives were sentenced to prison and assessed a $20,000 fine each.
