= Audi Q8 =

Mid-size luxury crossover SUV coupé

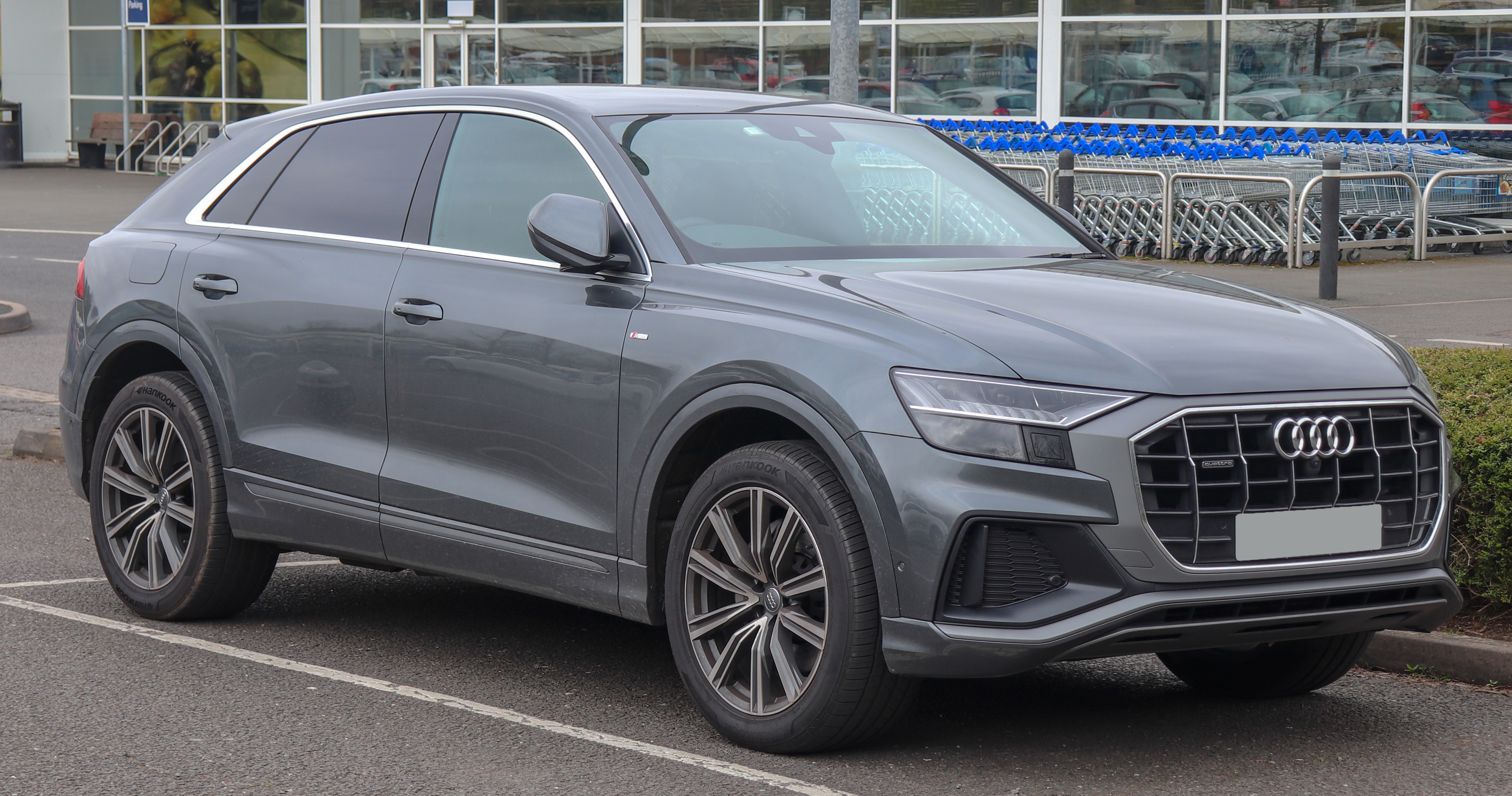

Overview
- Manufacturer: Audi
- Production: June 2018 – present
- Model years: 2019–present
- Assembly: Slovakia: Bratislava (Volkswagen Bratislava Plant)
- Designer: Sascha Heyde and Maurício Monteiro Dos Santos under Marc Lichte

Body and chassis
- Class: Mid-size luxury crossover SUV
- Body style: 5-door coupe SUV
- Layout: Front-engine, four-wheel-drive
- Platform: Volkswagen Group MLB Evo
- Related: Audi Q7; Bentley Bentayga; Lamborghini Urus; Porsche Cayenne; Volkswagen Touareg

Powertrain
- Engine: Petrol: 3.0 L TFSI V6; 4.0 L TFSI twin-turbo V8; Petrol plug-in hybrid: 3.0 L TFSI V6 PHEV; Diesel: 3.0 L TDI V6; 4.0 L TDI V8
- Electric motor: 48-volt system Belt alternator starter (BAS): MHEV; 100 kW (134 hp; 136 PS) AC induction motor: PHEV
- Transmission: 8-speed Tiptronic automatic (ZF 8HP)
- Hybrid drivetrain: PHEV (Q8 55/60 TFSIe)
- Battery: 17.3 kWh lithium-ion (PHEV)
- Electric range: 17 mi (27 km) (60 TFSI e)

Dimensions
- Wheelbase: 2,995 mm (117.9 in)
- Length: 4,986–5,012 mm (196.3–197.3 in)
- Width: 1,995 mm (78.5 in)
- Height: 1,705 mm (67.1 in)
- Curb weight: 2,145 kg (4,729 lb)

The Audi Q8 is a mid-size luxury crossover SUV made by Audi that was launched in 2018. It is being produced at the Volkswagen Bratislava Plant.

== Overview ==
BMW launched its coupe SUV in 2008, the BMW X6, and Mercedes-Benz followed suit in 2015 with the GLE-Class Coupe. Audi had been planning their own coupe SUV once the new body style became a sales success for other brands. Within the Volkswagen Group's product lineup, the Q8 shares its platform with the Q7 and the Lamborghini Urus, among other products. The Q8 is slightly shorter than the Q7 in terms of both length and height but is slightly wider. The Q8 has less cargo space than the Q7 due to its sloped roofline, and unlike the Q7, the Q8 is not available with third-row seats.

The Q8 is the first SUV model under Audi's new head of design, Marc Lichte, and features a new larger octagonal grille with both vertical and horizontal slats. The Q8 features full-laser headlamps and taillamps. The interior features the knob-less MMI system, three touch screens, and an enlarged virtual cockpit which has a fully digital instrument cluster, which would also be brought over to other Audi vehicles including the refreshed Q7 for the 2020 model year. Additionally, both haptic and acoustic feedback are provided in response to user inputs, although the design can still lead to distracted driving.

European models went on sale in July 2018 and arrived at dealers in August 2018. As of 2019, is sold with both a three-litre turbocharged petrol V6 engine outputting 340 brake horsepower (250 kW; 340 PS) and a pair of three-litre turbocharged diesel engines outputting 231 brake horsepower (172 kW; 234 PS) and 286 brake horsepower (213 kW; 290 PS) respectively.

The plug-in hybrid model, marketed as the Q8 TFSI e quattro is based on the Q8 3.0 TFSI (340 PS) model with a 17.9 kWh battery. Pre-sales began in Germany and other European markets in 2020. Early models included 55 TFSI e quattro, 60 TFSI e quattro.

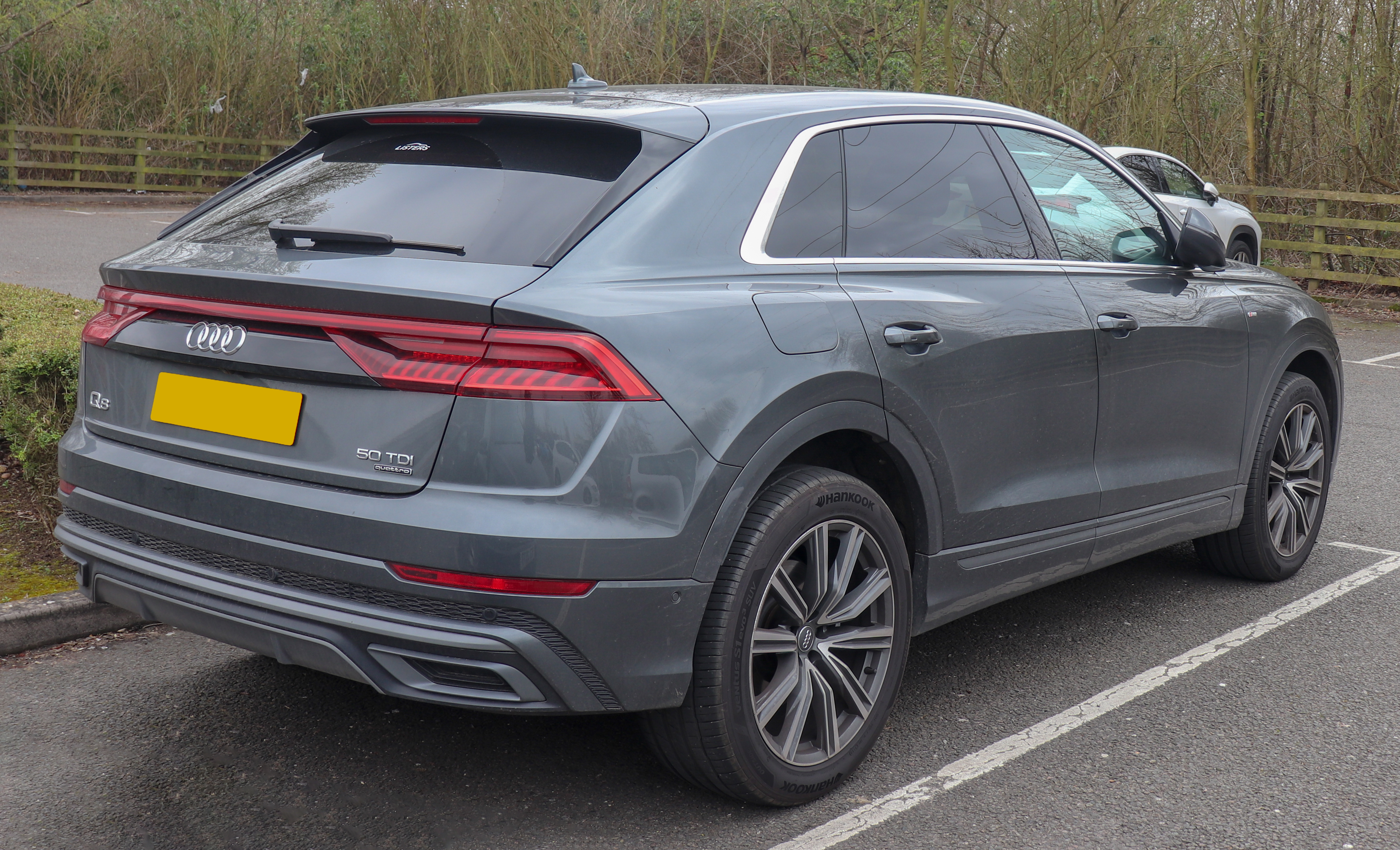
Rear view (pre-facelift)

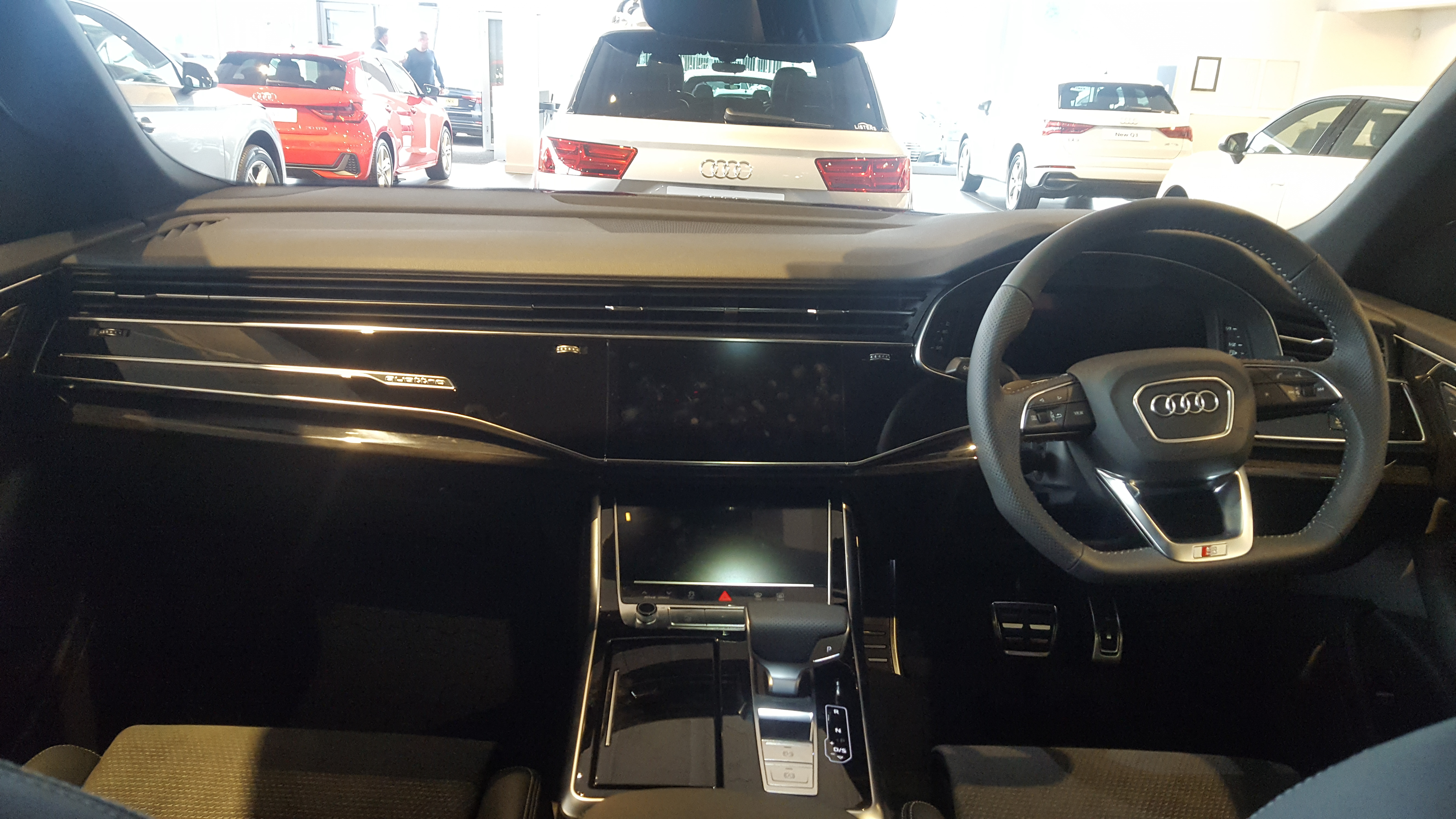
Interior (pre-facelift)

=== 2024 facelift ===
The facelifted Q8 was unveiled on 5 September 2023 for the 2024 model year. Subtle in nature, the exterior changes included larger air inlets in the front bumper, and a new exhaust setup which is fitted across the lineup. The Singleframe grille now has octagonal elements and flows smoothly into the headlamps. The SQ8 features a redesigned front spoiler and rear diffuser, while the grille, side view mirrors, and air intakes feature aluminium for an aesthetic appeal. The design of the Matrix LED headlights has been changed, and the Q8 will be available with the high-tech laser lights that increase the range of the high beams. The daytime running lights on range-topping variants be swapped four different lighting signatures via the infotainment screen, and the rear light bar has a more simple design.

Audi implemented OLED technology in the tail lamps of the facelifted Q8; this was not only added as an aesthetic, but was also as a safety feature. When a car behind comes within 6.6 ft (2.0 m) of a stationary Q8, the OLED elements are activated to make the car visible. The facelift adds three new metallic paints (Chili Red, Ascari Blue, Sakhir Gold) as well as five alloy wheel designs ranging from 21 to 23 inches. The new Q8 adds an available selection of nine inlays and new upholstery choices. Furthermore, new finishes such as fine grain ash, carbon twill, and aluminum linear silver grey are also available, depending on variant.

The SQ8 features a larger 4.0-litre V8 petrol engine with an output of 500 hp (370 kW) and 568 lb⋅ft (770 N⋅m), giving it a 0 to 60 output in 4.1 seconds and an electronically limited 155 mph (249 km/h). The unit can switch off four of its cylinders almost instantly to reduce fuel consumption when extra power is unnecessary. The SQ8 features 21-inch wheels with 285/45 tires, however 22- and 23-inch options are available, including a new 23-inch variant with 285/35 rubber. As with the regular Q8, it features Quattro all-wheel drive and an 8-speed Tiptronic transmission, allowing it to change gears quicker.

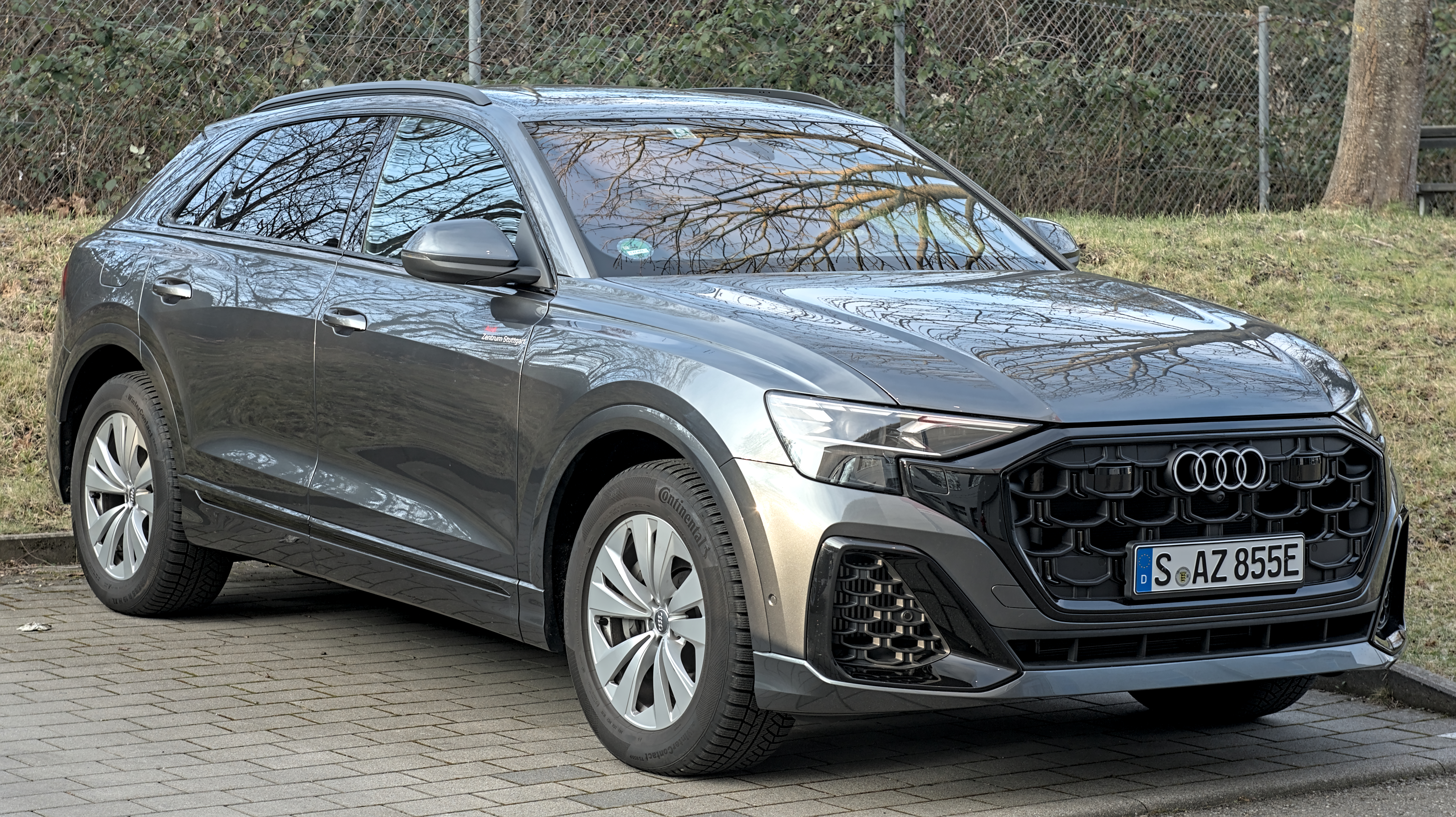
Audi Q8 S-Line (facelift)

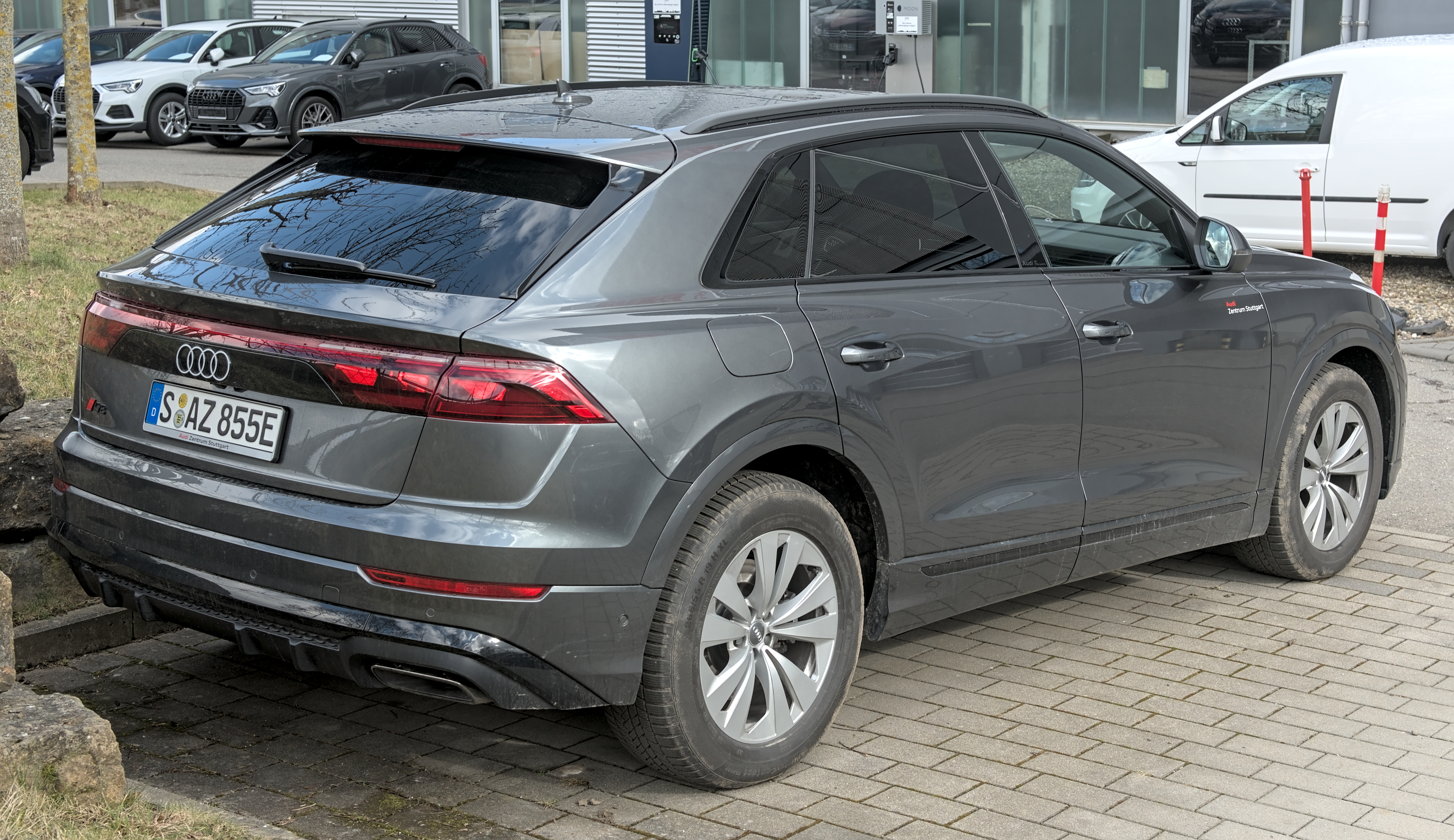
Rear view

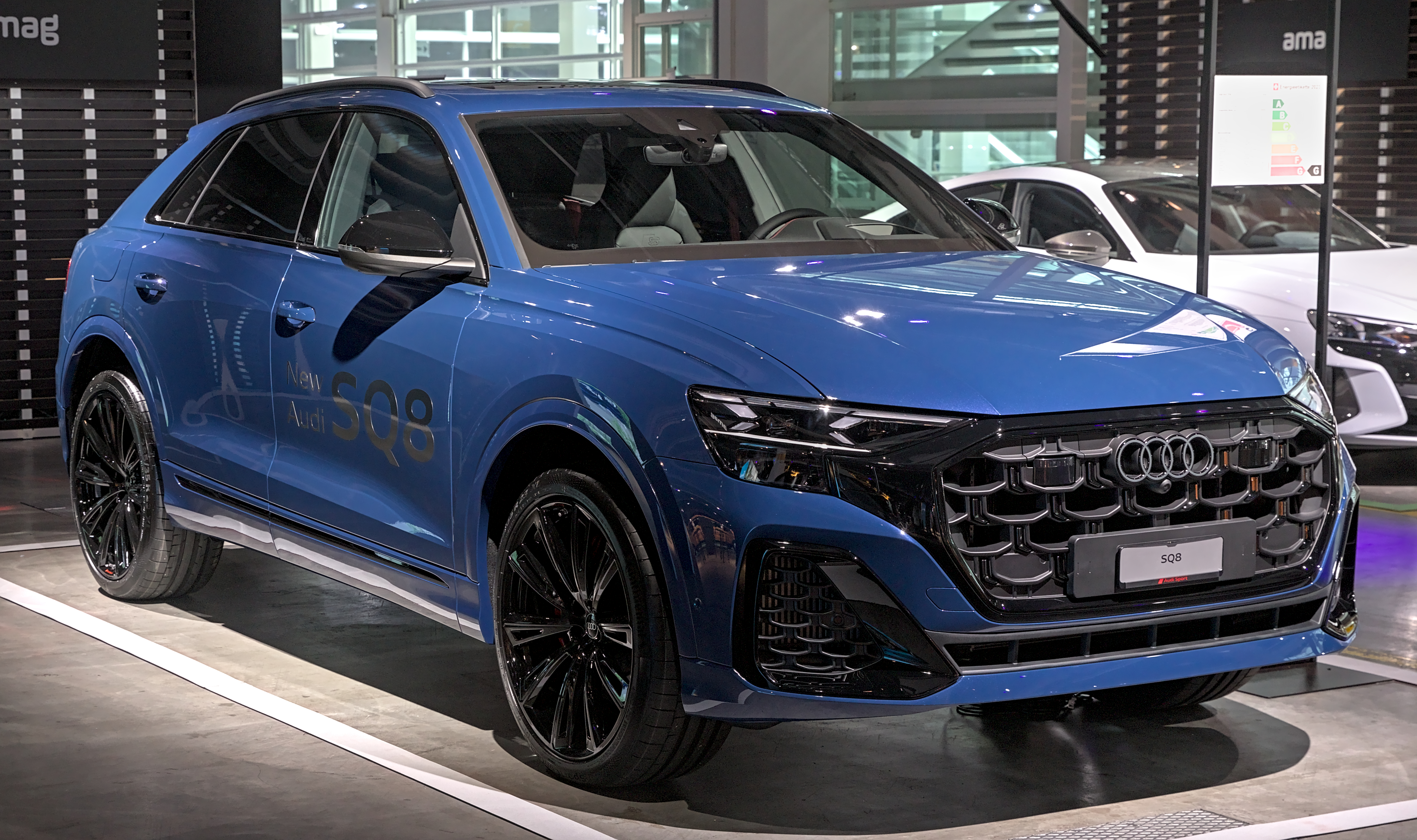
Audi SQ8 (facelift)

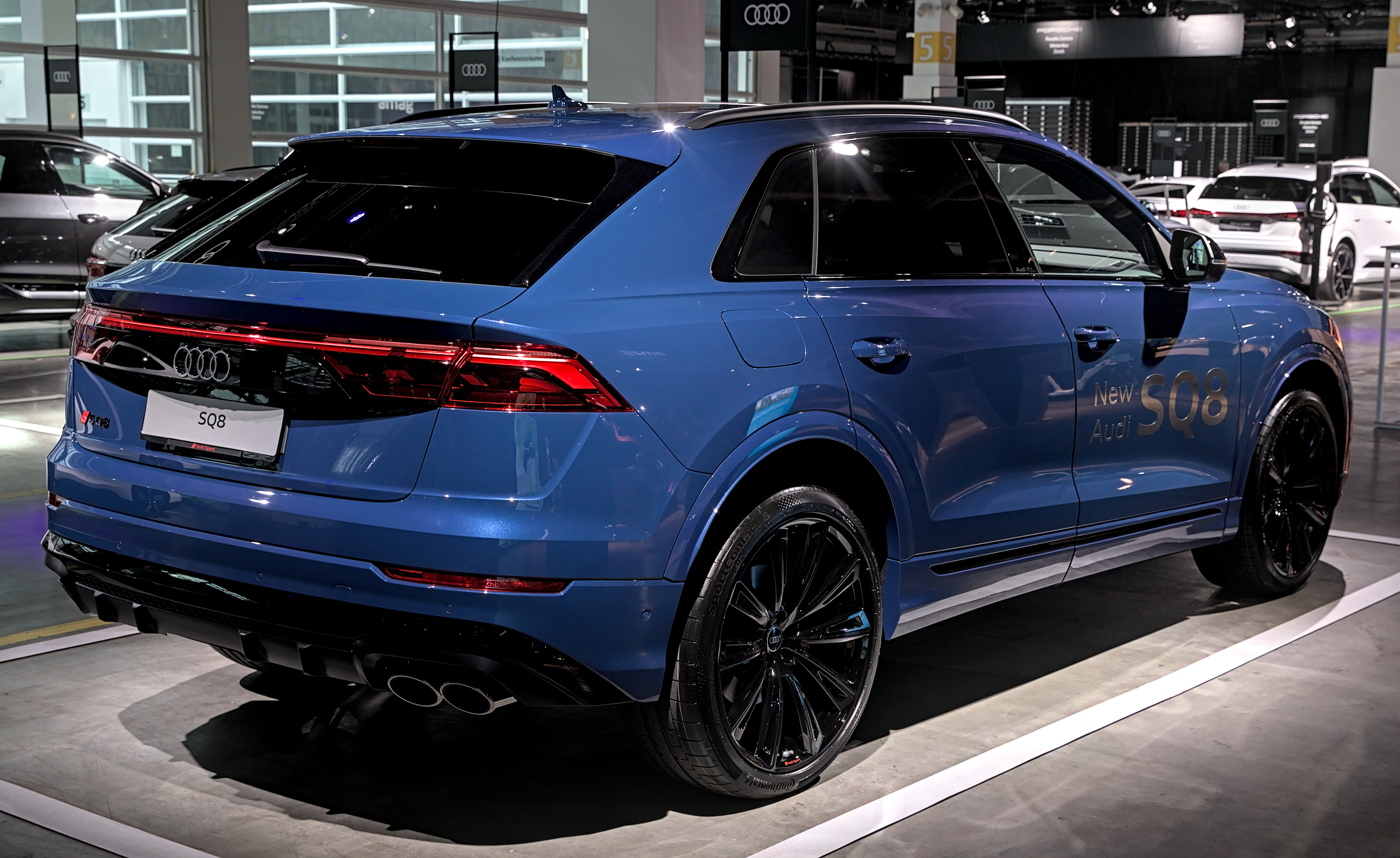
Rear view

== Concept models ==
=== Audi Q8 concept (2017) ===
The concept vehicle was unveiled on 9 January 2017, at the North American International Auto Show (NAIAS) in Detroit, Michigan. It included a 3.0 TFSI engine rated 333 PS (245 kW; 328 hp) and 500 N⋅m (368.8 lb⋅ft) torque, electric motor rated 100 kW (136 PS; 134 hp) and 330 N⋅m (243.4 lb⋅ft), 17.9 kWh lithium-ion battery, 11Jx23 wheels five intertwining Y spokes, 305/35-series tires 20 inch diameter ceramic brake discs, 12.3-inch TFT (1920 x 720 pixels) display.

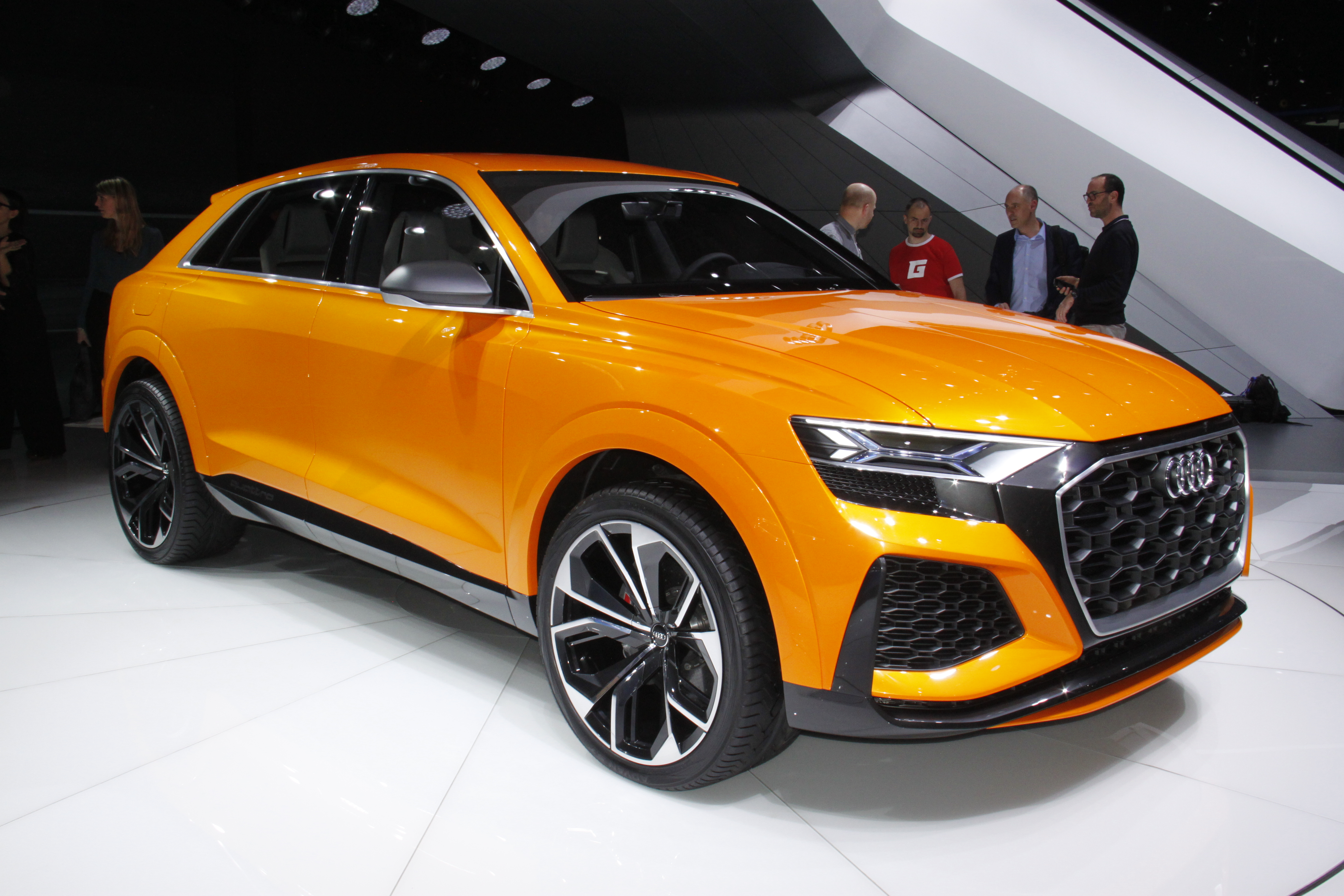
Audi Q8 Sport Concept

=== Audi Q8 sport concept (2017) ===
The concept vehicle was unveiled at the 2017 Geneva International Motor Show. It included a 3.0 TFSI engine rated 350 PS (257 kW; 345 hp), electric motor rated 20 kW (27 PS; 27 hp) and 170 N⋅m (125.4 lb⋅ft) torque (total power 350 kW (476 PS; 469 hp) and 700 N⋅m (516.3 lb⋅ft) torque), 85 L (22.5 US gal) fuel tank.

== SQ8 ==
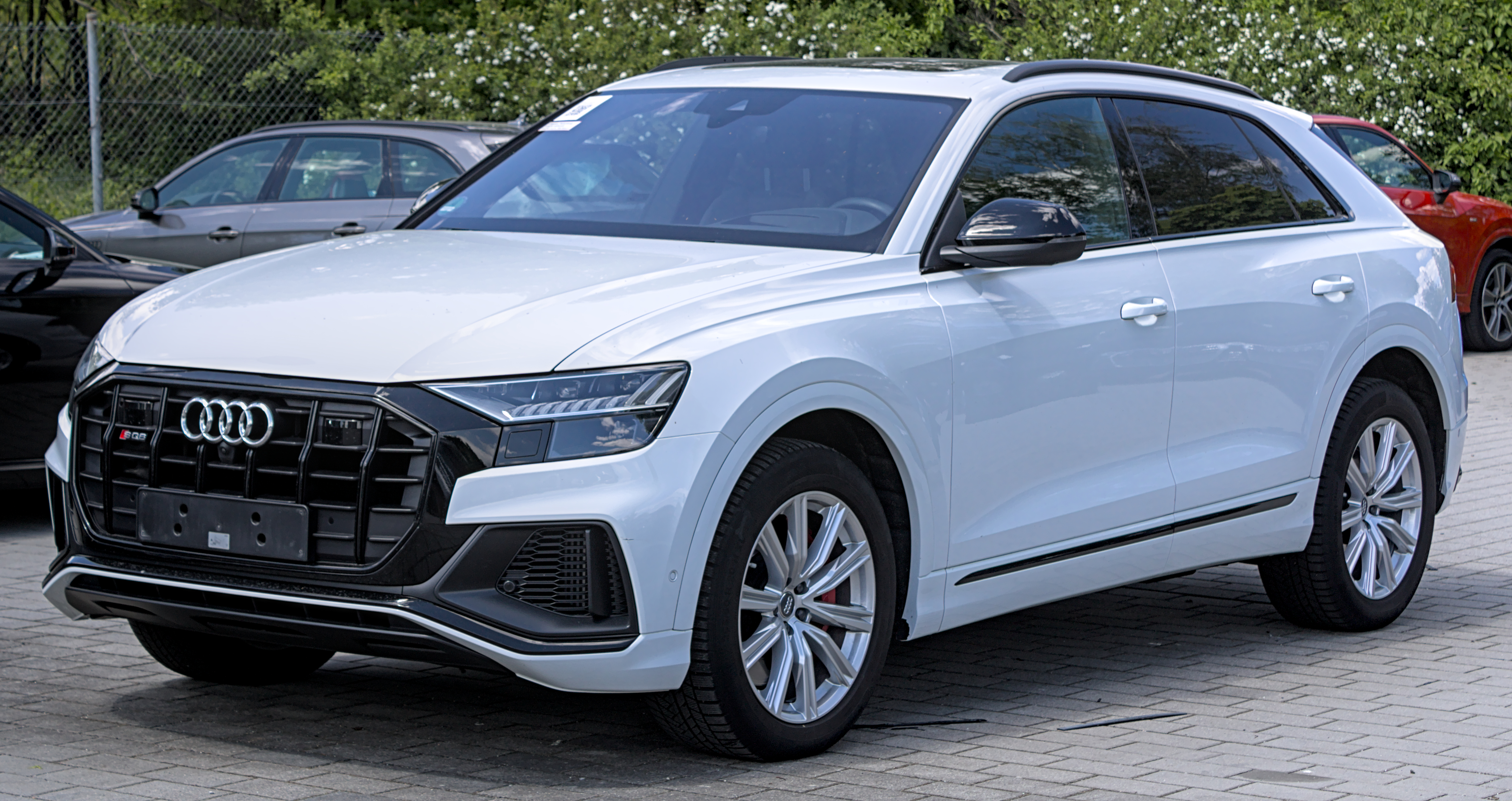

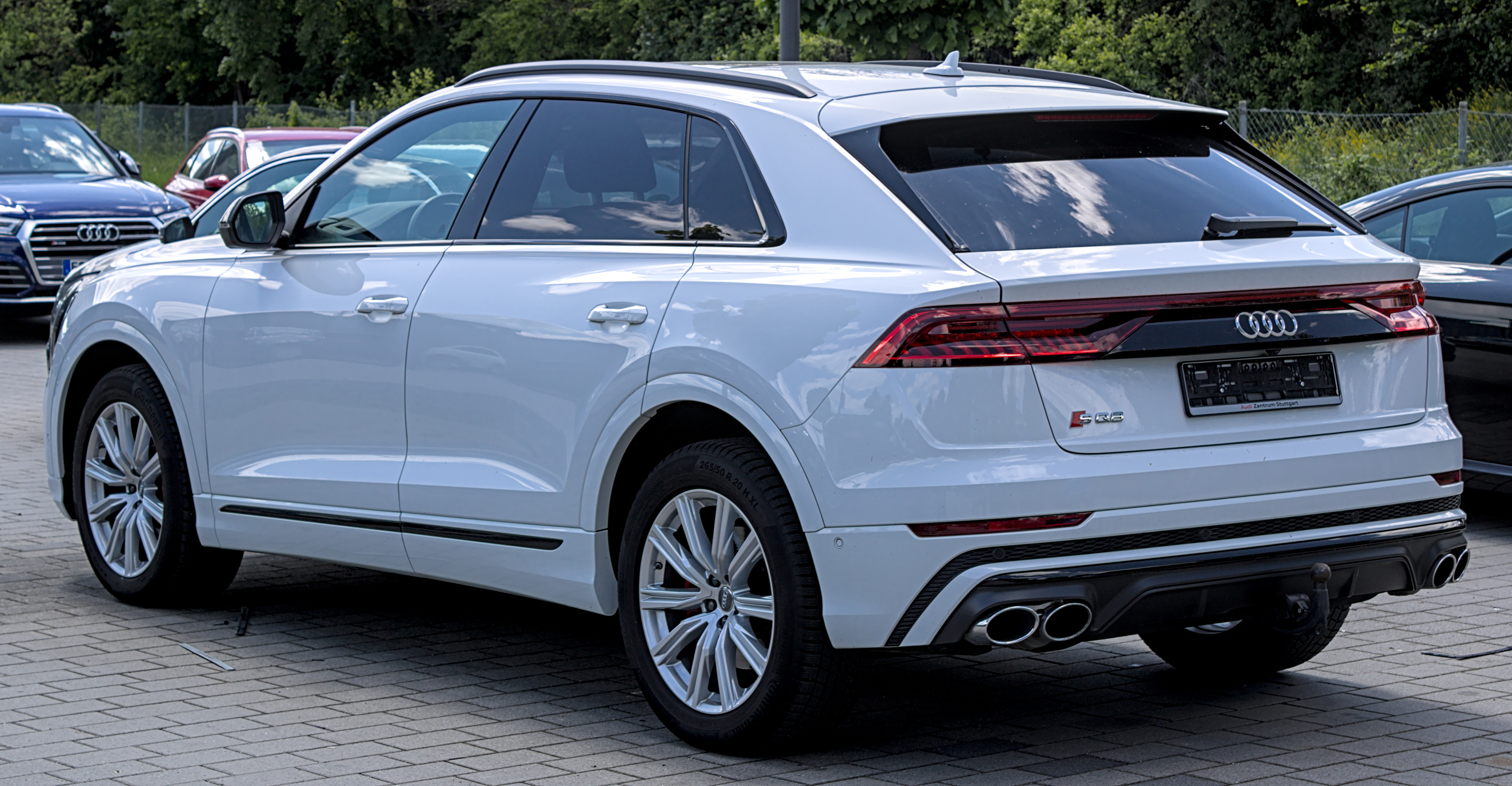
Audi SQ8

=== SQ8 4.0 TDI quattro ===
A performance-focused version called the Audi SQ8 was launched in June 2019 with chassis revisions, styling, and technology upgrades. It features a new 4.0-litre Biturbo V8 mild-hybrid diesel engine with 429 bhp and 900 N⋅m (664 lb⋅ft) of torque. Performance is sent through the 8-speed Tiptronic automatic gearbox to its Quattro all-wheel drive system. Euro-spec models have a claimed acceleration of 0–100 km/h (62 mph) in 4.8 seconds (0–60 mph (97 km/h) in 4.6 seconds) with an electronically limited top speed of 249 km/h (155 mph).

The new turbochargers are situated within the “V” of the engine block, which Audi claims creates better engine response. To further reduce the effects of turbo lag, the engine features sequential turbocharging, with only a small charger active at low engine speeds and a larger charger engaging above 2,200 rpm. An electric-powered compressor assists the turbocharger when starting and accelerating from lower speeds, compensating for the turbo's lack of boost at low revs by adding extra pressure to the intake to smooth out power delivery.

The compressor is also fed by the same 48 V lithium-ion battery pack which supports the SQ8's mild-hybrid system. Comprising a belt-driven alternator starter and regenerative brake system, it can power the SQ8 at speeds of up to 23 km/h (14 mph) and recover up to 8 kW of power under deceleration.

The SQ8 comes with adaptive air suspension and Drive Select dynamic handling system as standards. The advanced suspension package is available as an optional extra, adding four-wheel steering, sport differential, and electromechanical active anti-roll bars.

Styling differences include 21-inch alloy wheels, a revised, more aggressive body kit, new rear diffuser with oval exhaust tips as standard. Larger 22-inch alloys, Matrix LED headlights, red brake calipers, and carbon-ceramic brakes are available as optional extras.

The interior features leather and Alcantara-trimmed sports seats, stainless steel pedals, a digital instrument cluster, and center-mounted screens that control infotainment, heating, and air conditioning systems. Voice control, Wi-Fi hotspot Amazon Alexa, Android Auto, and Apple CarPlay support are standard.

Safety technology includes adaptive cruise control, traffic jam assist, active lane assist, and a 360-degree camera. It includes a maneuvering assist system which Audi claims to help soften low-speed parking collisions by applying small steering and braking corrections along with a curb warning system which helps prevent damage to the alloys. Deliveries in the UK started in September 2019.

=== SQ8 4.0 TFSI quattro ===
The SQ8 4.0 TFSI quattro is a version of SQ8 with a 4.0-litre twin-turbocharged V8 petrol engine rated 507 PS (373 kW; 500 hp) and 770 N⋅m (567.9 lb⋅ft) of torque. It accelerates from 0-60 mph (97 km/h) within 4.1 seconds and on to a maximum speed of 250 km/h (155 mph).

European model (507PS) went on sale in autumn 2020. It went on sale in late spring 2020 in the United States as the sole SQ8 model.

== RS Q8 ==
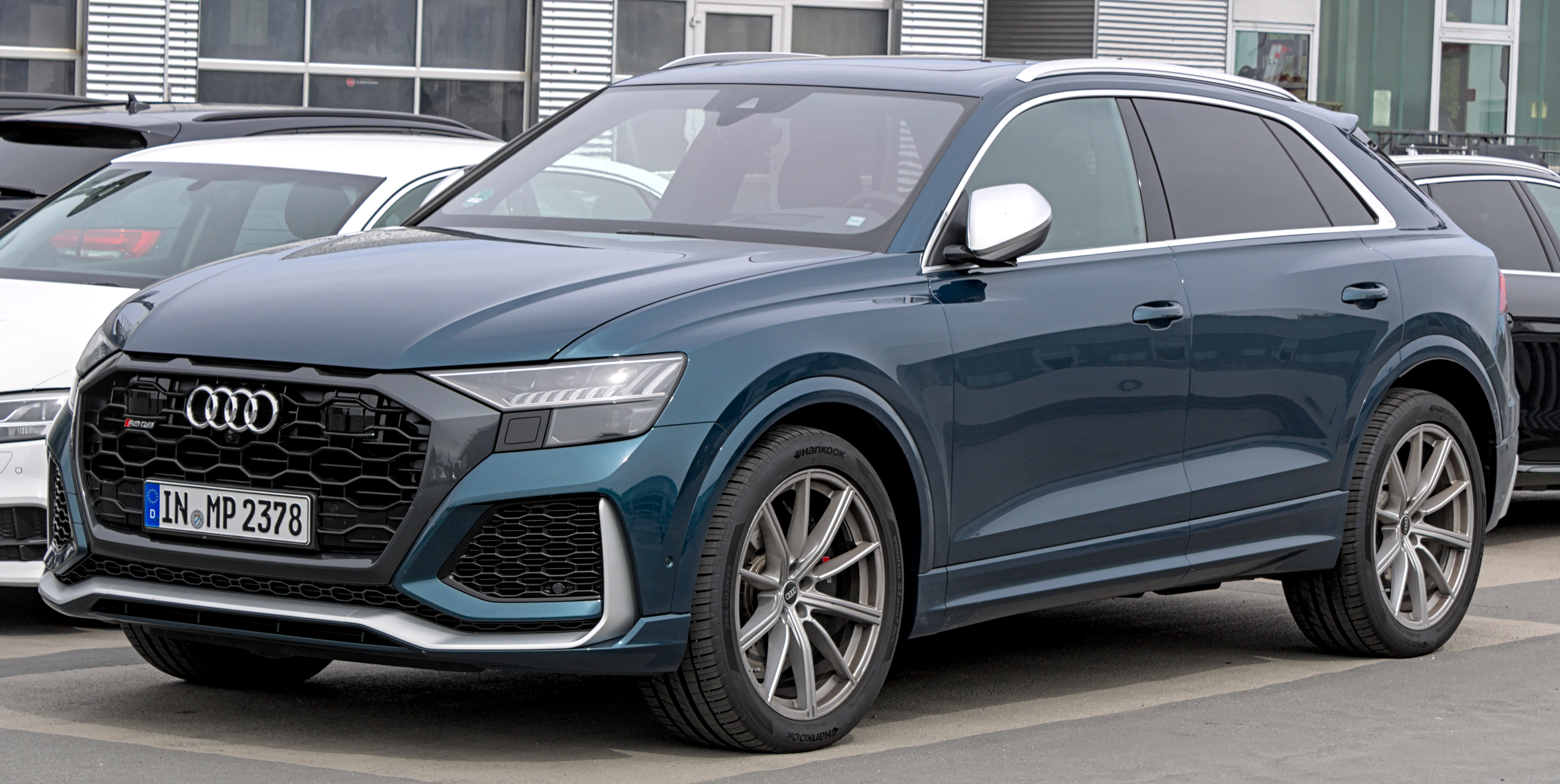

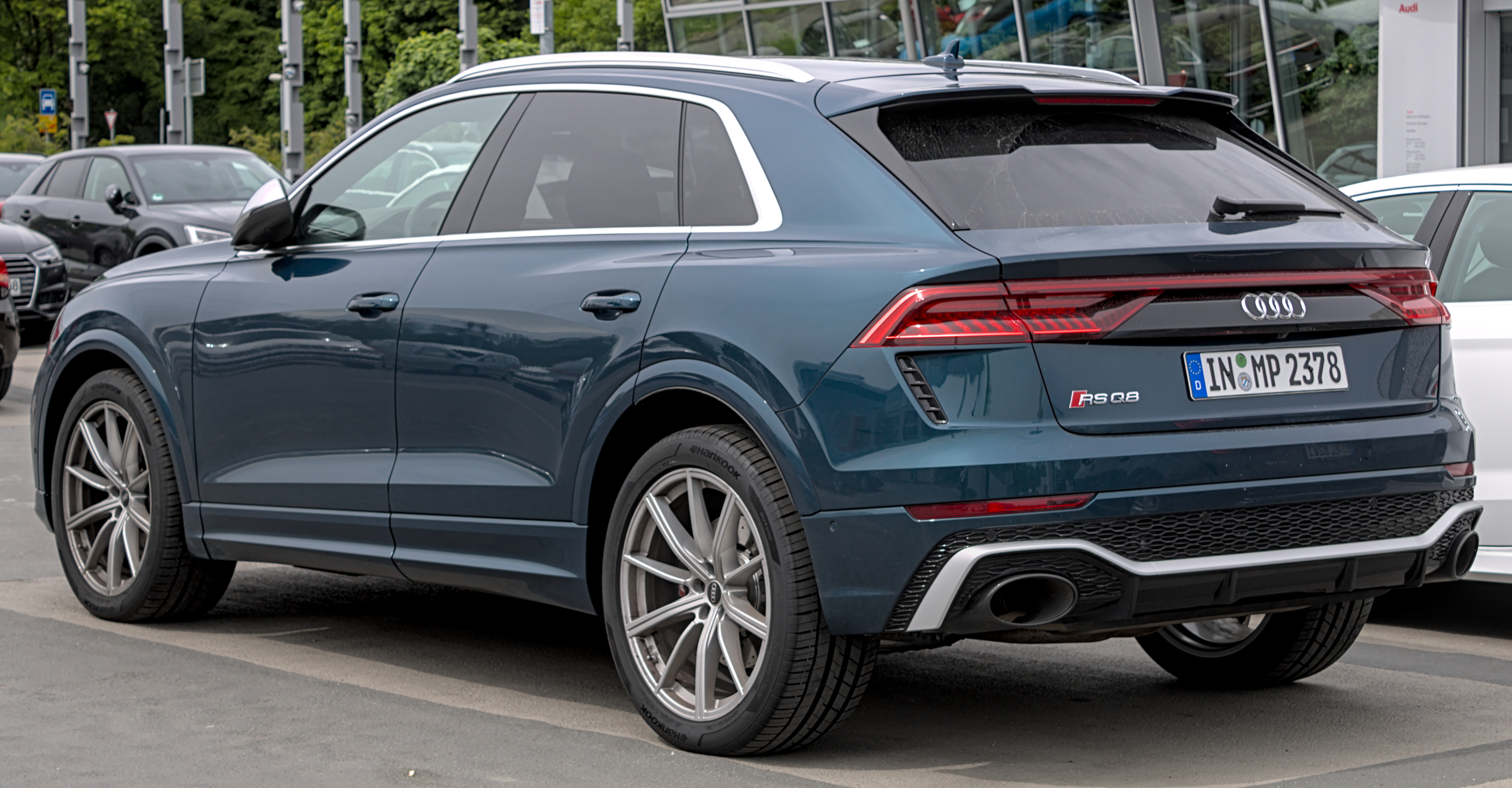
Audi RSQ8

The RS Q8 is a performance version of the Q8 and was unveiled at the 2019 LA Auto Show in November. The engine is shared with the RS 6 C8 and RS 7 4K8, a 4.0 TFSI engine rated 600 PS (441 kW; 592 hp) and 800 N⋅m (590.0 lb⋅ft) of torque. Like the SQ8, performance is sent through the 8-speed Tiptronic automatic gearbox (ZF 8HP90) to its Quattro all-wheel drive system. Audi claims 0–100 km/h (0–62 mph) in 3.8 seconds. The top speed is electronically limited to 250 km/h (155.3 mph) (305 km/h (189.5 mph) with dynamic package). A live-link suspension is featured at the front and the rear along with adaptive air suspension standard with controlled damping. The interior features Audi's MMI dual-touchscreen setup with RS-specific displays, as well as RS-embossed sport seats in black pearl Nappa leather and Alcantara and an RS leather-covered flat-bottom steering wheel. Styling differences include an RS-specific grille, larger air intakes, bespoke trim strips, and an available sport exhaust system with black tailpipe trim. The standard wheels on the RS Q8 are 22-inch, 10-spoke aluminum wrapped in 295/40-series tires, while 23-inch wheels are optional. Deliveries in the UK were scheduled for early 2020.

For the 2021 model year, all Q8s came with blind-spot monitoring, and the base Premium trim's Convenience package included a heated steering wheel and a 360-degree parking camera.

European models went on sale in the 1st quarter of 2020.

In 2024, the RS Q8 was facelifted, and a Performance version was introduced, featuring a 640 hp V8 engine.

== Powertrain ==
Audi Q8	Petrol				Diesel			Plug-in hybrid	
Audi Q8	55 TFSI quattro	SQ8 TFSI	RS Q8	RS Q8 Performance	45 TDI quattro	50 TDI quattro	SQ8 TDI	55 TFSI e	60 TFSI e
Engine	2,995 cc (182.8 cu in) V6	3,996 cc (243.9 cu in) twin-turbo V8			2,967 cc (181.1 cu in) V6		3,956 cc (241.4 cu in) V8	2,995 cc (182.8 cu in) V6 + AC induction motor & 17.3 kWh battery	
Maximum power	250 kW (340 PS; 340 hp) @ 5200-6400 rpm	373 kW (507 PS; 500 hp) @ 5500 rpm	441 kW (600 PS; 591 hp) @ 6000 rpm	470 kW (640 PS; 630 hp) @ 6000 rpm	170 kW (230 PS; 230 hp) @ 3250 rpm	210 kW (290 PS; 280 hp) @ 3500-4000 rpm	320 kW (440 PS; 430 hp) @ 3750-4750 rpm	381 PS (376 hp; 280 kW)	456 PS (450 hp; 335 kW)
Maximum torque, N · m / lb-ft at rpm	369 lb⋅ft (500 N⋅m) @ 1370–4500 rpm	570 lb⋅ft (770 N⋅m) @ 2000–4000 rpm	590 lb⋅ft (800 N⋅m) @ 2200–4500 rpm	627 lb⋅ft (850 N⋅m) @ 2300–4500 rpm	369 lb⋅ft (500 N⋅m) @ 1750-3250 rpm	443 lb⋅ft (601 N⋅m) @ 2250–3250 rpm	663 lb⋅ft (899 N⋅m) @ 1250–3250 rpm	443 lb⋅ft (601 N⋅m)	516 lb⋅ft (700 N⋅m)
Type of drive	Permanent AWD with 40:60 front/rear torque split (quattro)								
Transmission	8 speed ZF Automatic (tiptronic)								
Curb Weight	2,070 kg (4,560 lb)	2,345 kg (5,170 lb)	2,315 kg (5,104 lb)	2,275 kg (5,016 lb)	2,120 kg (4,670 lb)	2,120 kg (4,670 lb)	2,340 kg (5,160 lb)	2,430 kg (5,360 lb)	
Top speed	130 mph (210 km/h) 149 mph (240 km/h)			250 km/h (160 mph)	145 mph (233 km/h)	152 mph (245 km/h)	155 mph (249 km/h)	149 mph (240 km/h)	
Acceleration 0–60 mph (0–97 km/h)	5.6 s	4.1 s	3.8 s	3.4 s	7.1 s	6.3 s	4.8 s	5.8 s	5.4 s
Fuel consumption /100 km	11.4 / 7.4 / 8.9 L	16.6 / 9.4 / 12.0 L	17.0 / 9.3-9.2 / 12.1 L	12.8-13.4	7.0 / 6.1 / 6.4 L	7.1 / 6.4 / 6.6 L	7.8 L	2.9 L	2.6-2.8 L

== Safety ==
=== ANCAP ===
ANCAP test results* Audi Q8 3.0 litre petrol & diesel variants only (2019, aligned with Euro NCAP)
Test	Points	%
Overall:	5 /5 stars	
Adult occupant:	35.3	93%
Child occupant:	43.2	88%
Pedestrian:	34.4	71%
Safety assist:	9.7	75%

=== Euro NCAP ===
Euro NCAP test results* Audi Q8 50 TDI quattro (LHD) (2019)
Test	Points	%
Overall:	5 /5 stars	
Adult occupant:	35.3	93%
Child occupant:	43	87%
Pedestrian:	34.5	71%
Safety assist:	9.5	73%

=== IIHS ===
IIHS scores (2019 model year)
Small overlap front (driver)	Good	
Small overlap front (passenger)	Good	
Moderate overlap front (original test)	Good	
Side (original test)	Good	
Side (updated test)	Good	
Roof strength	Good	
Head restraints and seats	Good	
Headlights	Acceptable	Poor
Front crash prevention: vehicle-to-vehicle	Superior	
Front crash prevention: vehicle-to-pedestrian (Day)	Superior	
Child seat anchors (LATCH) ease of use	Good	

== Production and sales ==
Q8's components were made in structural components shop within the Münchsmünster production site.

Sales
Year	China			US
Year	Q8	RSQ8	Total	US
2023	2,348	74	2,422	13,550
2024	1,579	68	1,647	10,352
2025	495	92	587	10,881

== Awards ==
Q8 won Auto Zeitung's Auto Trophy 2020 award under Luxury SUV category.

== Marketing ==
As part of the Q8 launch, in May 2018, Audi started a cinematic-styled miniseries that teased the Audi Q8 in five short episodes. The car made its first full appearance in the fifth episode, presented on a special microsite and shown to the public at the Audi China Brand Summit in Shenzhen.

As part of Audi's sponsorship of Spider-Man: Far From Home, Audi Q8 appeared in the movie.
