= Volkswagen Slovakia =

Automotive factory

Coordinates: 48°14′03″N 16°59′16″E

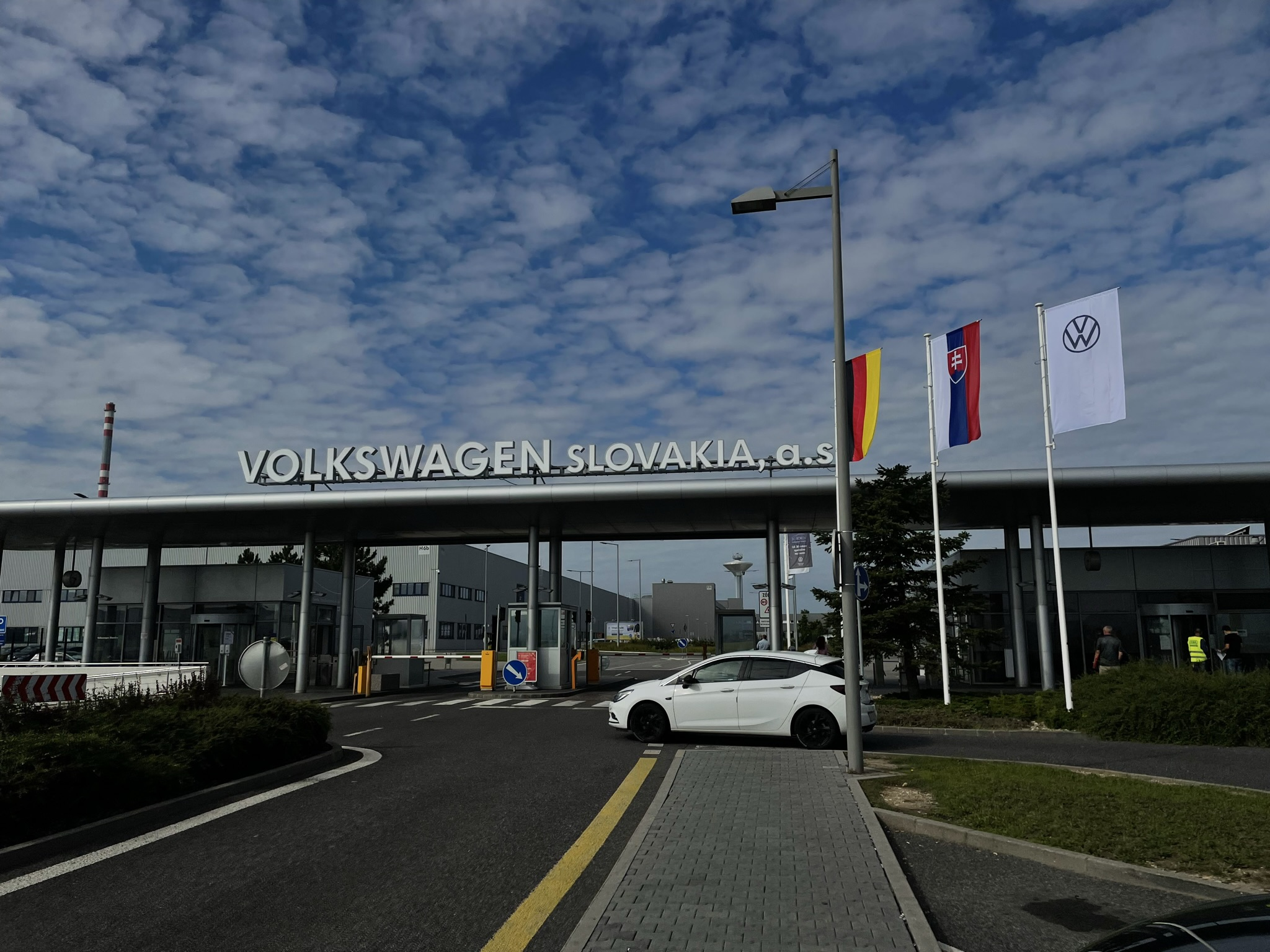
Main entrance, VW2

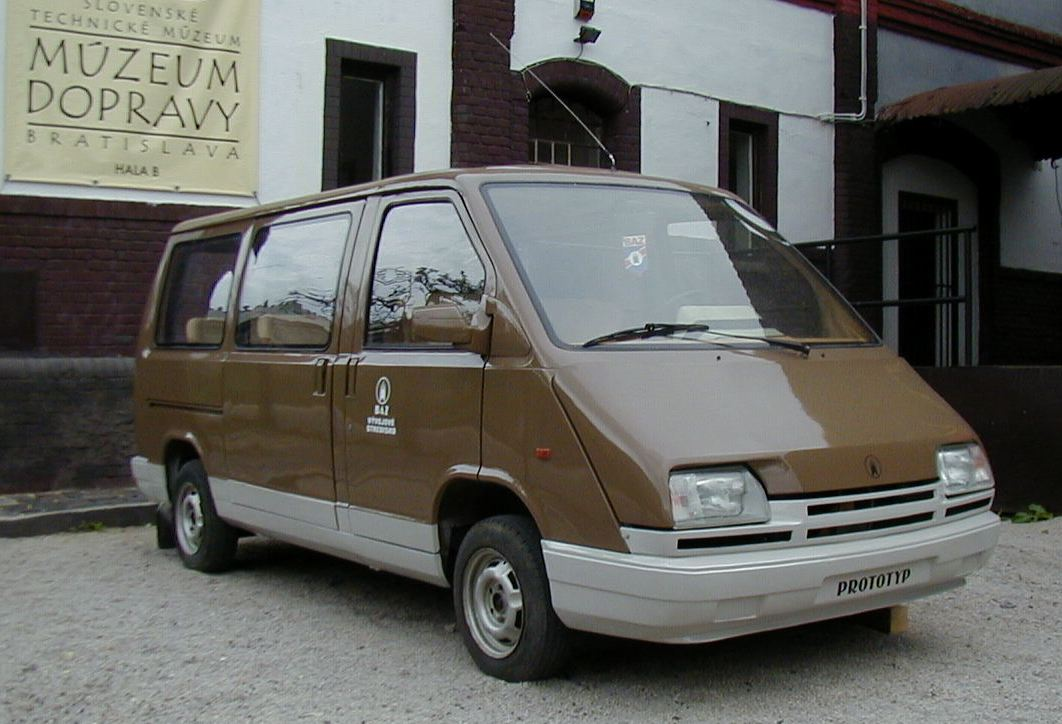
Prototype BAZ MNA 900, 1986

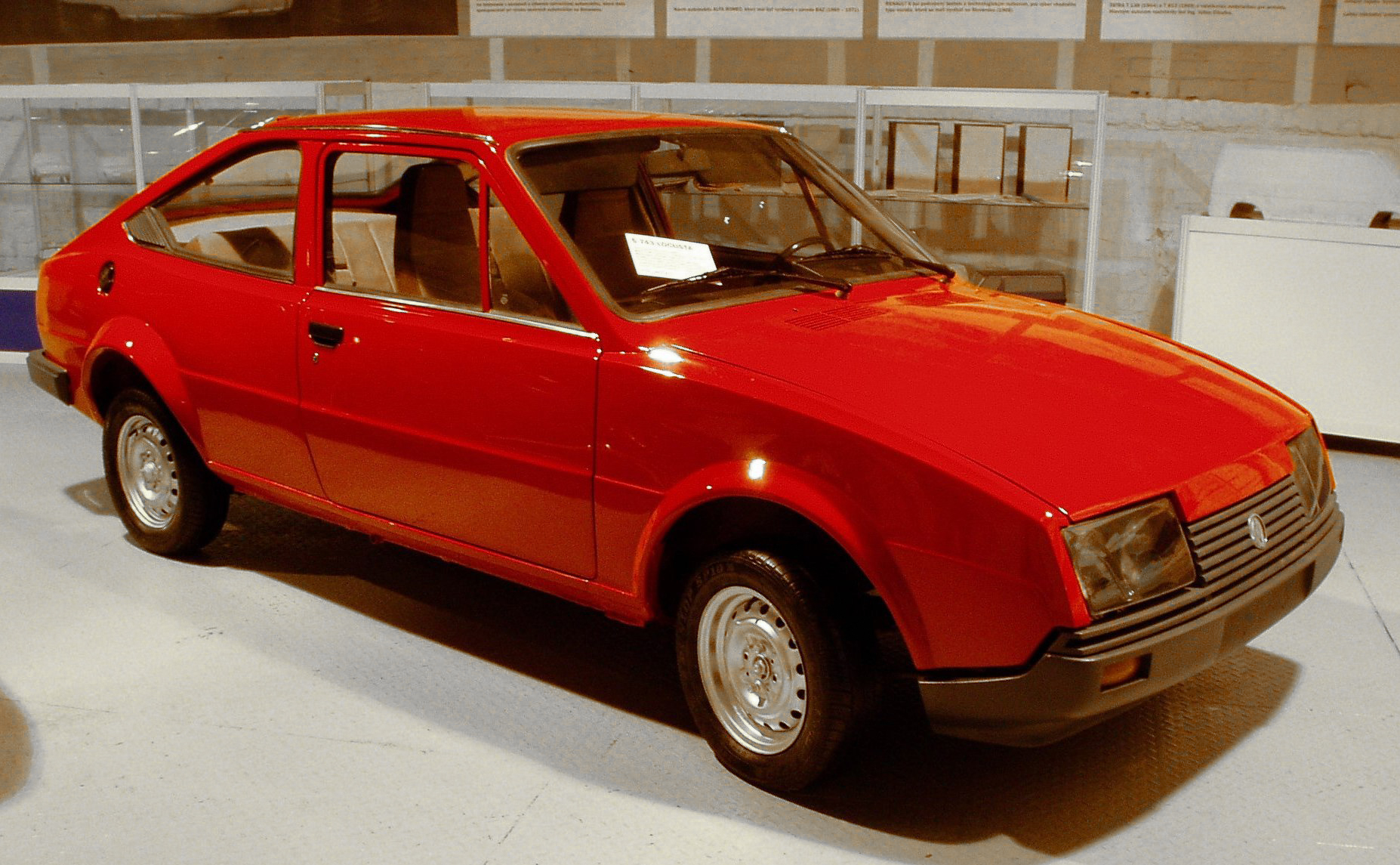
Prototype BAZ Locusta 3-door coupé 1982

Prototype BAZ MNA 1000, 1991

The Volkswagen Bratislava Plant is an automotive factory and co-located test track owned by Volkswagen Group in Bratislava, Slovakia.

== History ==
Funded by the ruling Communist Party to expand car production across Czechoslovakia, it agreed a partnership in 1969 with Italian automaker Alfa Romeo, but the proposed new model was never developed beyond the clay mock-up.

On 1 July 1971, Bratislavské Automobilové Závody (BAZ) was founded, sub-contracted to produce Škoda Auto models, but with all pressings and parts supplied by the Czech-based partner. The factory built the Ital Design-designed 731 (saloon) and 732 (station wagon) prototypes, as well as other BAZ marketed small (MNA) and medium-sized trucks (STA/SNA Devín). Later vehicles developed included the front-engined, 3-door Locusta coupé prototype.

BAZ vehicle production ended in 1982, when the production of the BAZ Garde was started, with the resultant development of the factory spurring the construction of new apartment blocks in the borough of Devínska Nová Ves. However, parts supply from the parent plant in the Czech Republic was slow, resulting often in a number of part-finished vehicles being held in storage, often awaiting singular parts. The factory later produced the Škoda Rapid, as well as a variety of parts for other car manufacturers in Czechoslovakia.

Some prototypes from BAZ can be seen in Museum of Transport in Bratislava.

=== Volkswagen Group ===
After the fall of the Iron Curtain, in May 1991 Volkswagen Group bought an 80% share of BAZ. Škoda production continued, and was expanded to include other models within the VW Group portfolio, initially the Volkswagen Passat. In 1998 Volkswagen Group bought out the remaining company shares, and renamed the company Volkswagen Slovakia. Volkswagen then bought the remaining shares in Škoda Auto in 2000.

Since VW developed their large SUV platform, the factory has become a specialist producer of all VW Group marques large SUVs, which presently include the Audi Q7, the Audi Q8 and the Volkswagen Touareg, and the co-designed Porsche Cayenne which is based on the same platform. It is also the only VW Group factory to produce the Golf Syncro four-wheel drive. Since December 2011 the factory has produced the Volkswagen Up, as well as its badge-engineered SEAT Mii and Škoda Citigo siblings for European markets.

== Operations ==
The factory area of the plant currently covers an area of 1,780,058 square metres (19,160,380 sq ft). Bodies are assembled and welded in one of two body shops, and then painted with one of 26 standard colours in the paint shop. The co-located Aggregate/Modules hall produces gearboxes for both on-site consumption and various models of the VW Group brands. The bodies are moved to the assembly hall, which covers an area equivalent to 21 football pitches, where the painted body is mated with the pre-assembled under-body and chassis. The VW Group and Porsche models then split.

The Audi Q7 and Volkswagen Touareg and Up! variants are completed by installing the finishing components including wiring, wheels, seats and the steering wheel. The final assembled SUV is then transported via cable car to the co-located test track for a final on-road test. If the car then passes a further inspection, it is prepared for dealer delivery. Since 2016, the Bentley Bentayga has also been produced at Bratislava.

=== Logistics ===
DHL handle all shipping and distribution arrangements from the site, via railway (70%) or road. Aside from on-site body pressings, gearbox production, and various under-body and drive train components sourced from the Martin plant; 90% of parts are delivered to site from Volkswagen's component consolidation centre in Wolfsburg, Germany, shipped directly to site via 10 daily trains.

First and second generation Porsche Cayenne models were sent direct to shipping once the body had been mated with under body. They were then shipped directly by rail to the Porsche factory in Leipzig, Germany, where interior fitting out, finishing and inspection were completed. Third generation Porsche Cayenne are being completely produced, and finished directly in Bratislava.

== Production ==
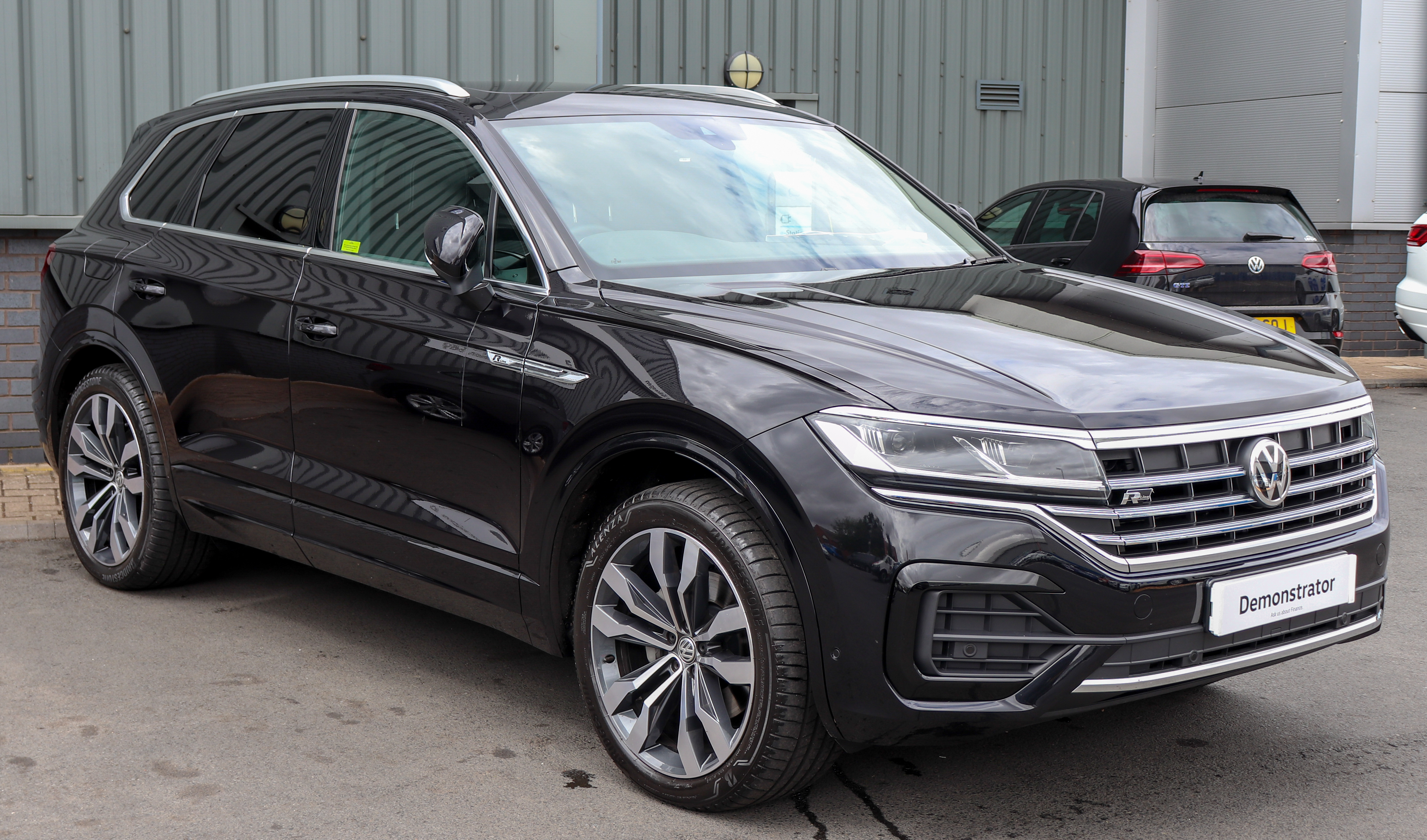
Volkswagen Touareg was produced at the Volkswagen plant in Bratislava.

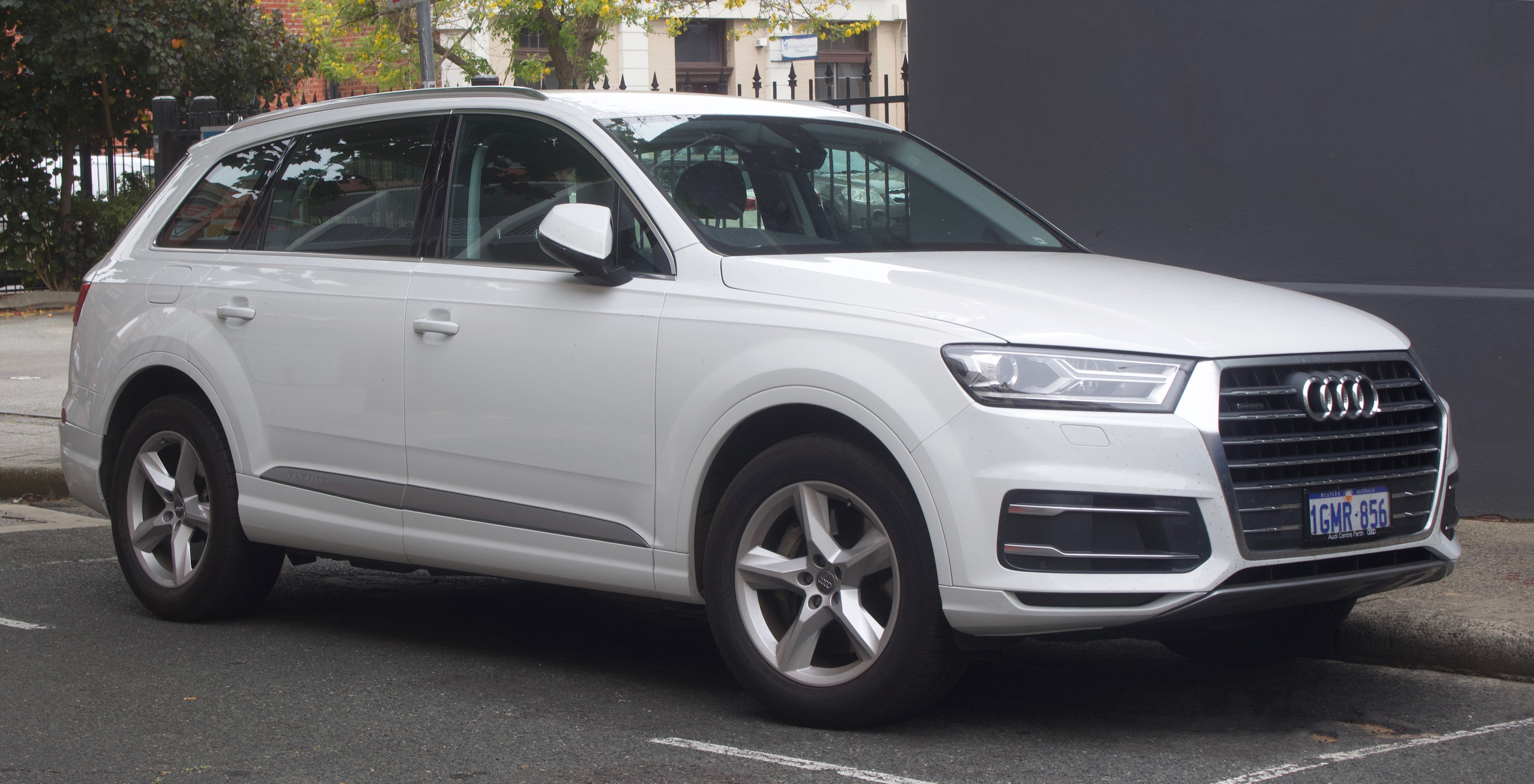
Audi Q7 is produced at the Volkswagen plant in Bratislava.

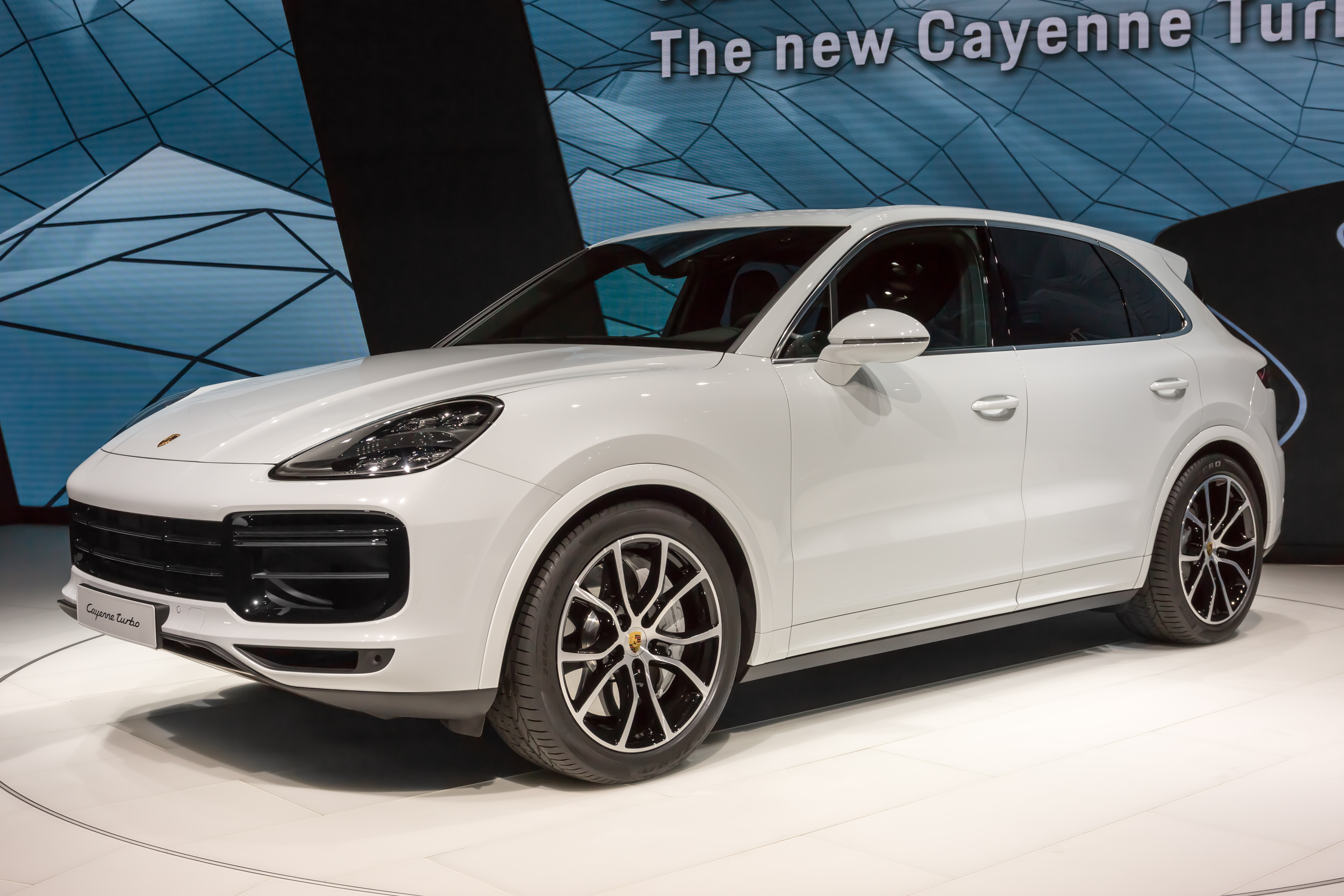
The Porsche Cayenne, assembled at the Volkswagen plant in Bratislava.

- Current models:
  - Audi Q7 (2005–present)
  - Audi Q8 (2018–present)
  - Audi Q9 (2026–present)
  - Porsche Cayenne (2002–present)
  - Porsche Cayenne Coupé (2019−present)
  - Škoda Superb (2023–present)
  - Volkswagen Passat (2023–present)
- Past models:
  - SEAT Ibiza (6L) (2003−2005)
  - SEAT Mii (2011−2021)
  - Škoda Citigo (2011−2020)
  - Škoda Octavia (2008–2010)
  - Škoda Karoq (2020–2023)
  - Volkswagen Up (2011–2023)
  - Volkswagen Touareg (2002–2026)
  - Volkswagen Polo (1999−2007)
  - Volkswagen Golf (1994−2005)
  - Volkswagen Bora
  - Volkswagen Passat
