= Coupe SUV =

Style for motor vehicle

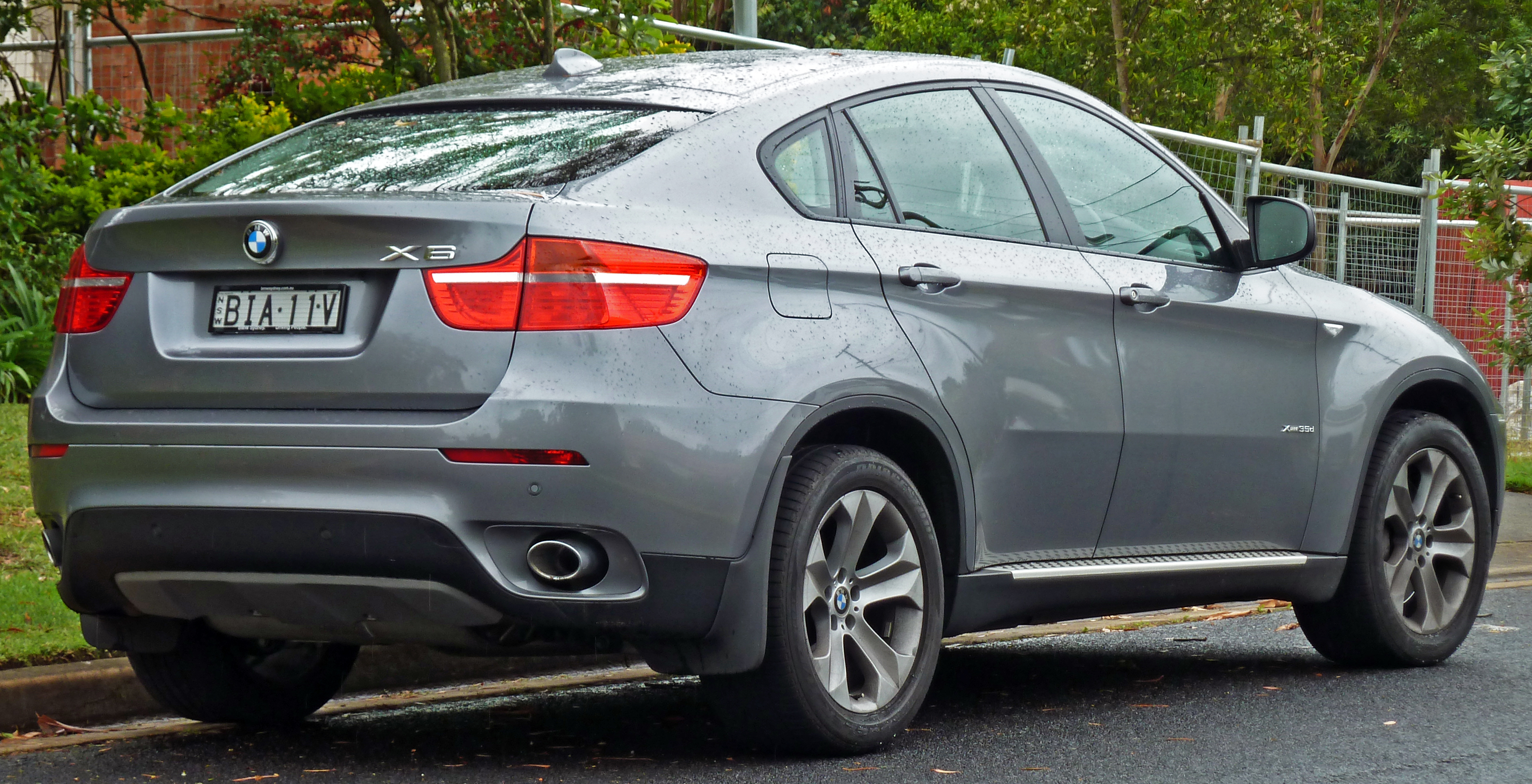
The first-generation BMW X6, widely regarded as the first coupe SUV

A coupe SUV is a type of sport utility vehicle with a sloping rear roofline similar to those of fastbacks or Kammbacks. Compared to a more typical SUV or crossover, a coupe SUV trades rear cargo space and headroom for reduced drag and a lowered center of mass, and a sleeker visual design.

Although the term "coupe" traditionally refers to a two- or three-door body style with a truncated or sloping rear roofline, most coupe SUVs are equipped with five doors.

The body style initially received criticism, citing reduced practicality as opposed to a standard SUV.

== History ==
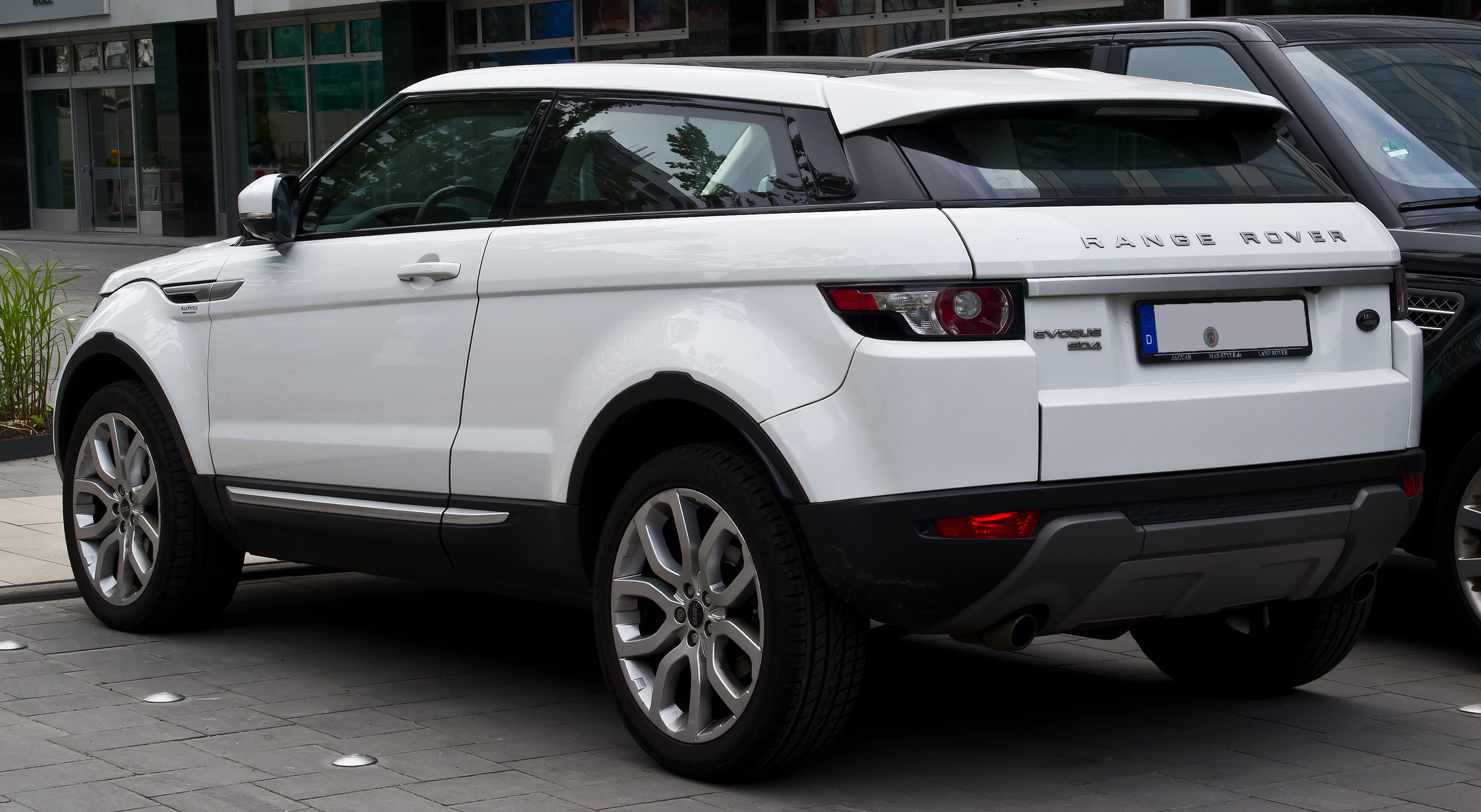
Range Rover Evoque Coupé, a three-door coupe SUV

The SsangYong Actyon is generally considered the first coupe SUV. In Europe, the BMW X6 was considered the first of its kind. It was based on the BMW X5 and has been marketed as a "Sports Activity Coupé" (SAC), as opposed to standard BMW crossovers, which are called "Sports Activity Vehicles" (SAVs). Introduced in 2008, the X6's styling generated some controversy upon its introduction, as it had less cargo space and a higher price. Mercedes-Benz followed suit in 2015 with the GLE-Class Coupe, while Audi released the Q8 in 2018.

The AMC Eagle SX/4, which was introduced in 1981, has also been argued to be the first coupe SUV, since it is a lifted two-door liftback with a permanent all-wheel drive system and was marketed as a car that is capable of light-duty off-roading. The second-generation Lexus RX and the 2003 Infiniti FX had introduced similar sloping roof design elements without being marketed as coupe SUVs.

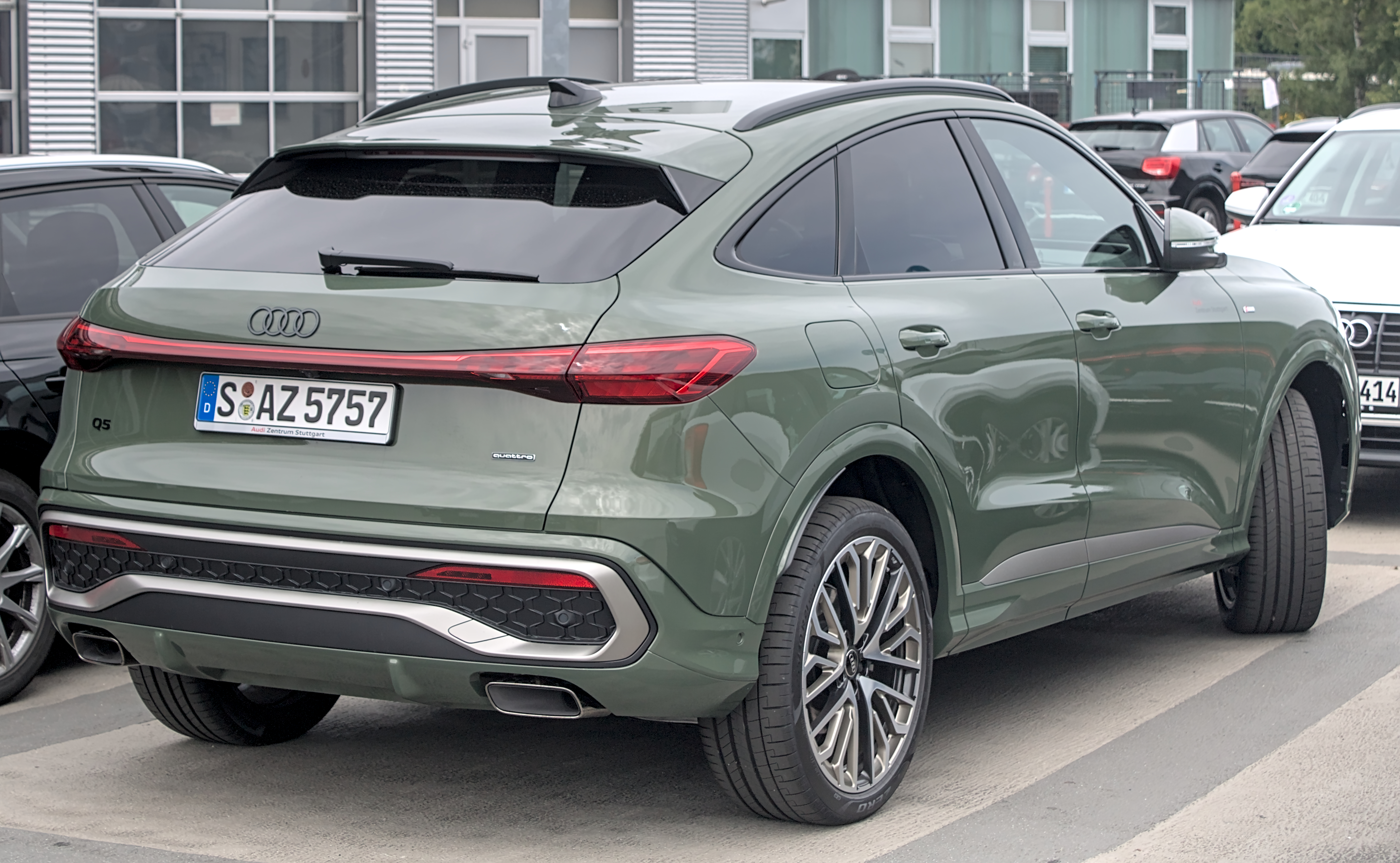
Audi Q5 Sportback

Due to its roots from the BMW X6, the segment in its early days mostly consisted of vehicles in the luxury segment. Audi released the coupe version of their Q5 crossover with the "Sportback" moniker, while Mercedes-Benz uses the "Coupé" designation, both in line with their two-door and four-door coupes or fastbacks. Several manufacturers began offering coupe crossovers from non-luxury segments, for example the Renault Arkana, the Fiat Fastback, and some China-only models such as the Mazda CX-4, Volkswagen Tiguan X and Škoda Kodiaq GT.

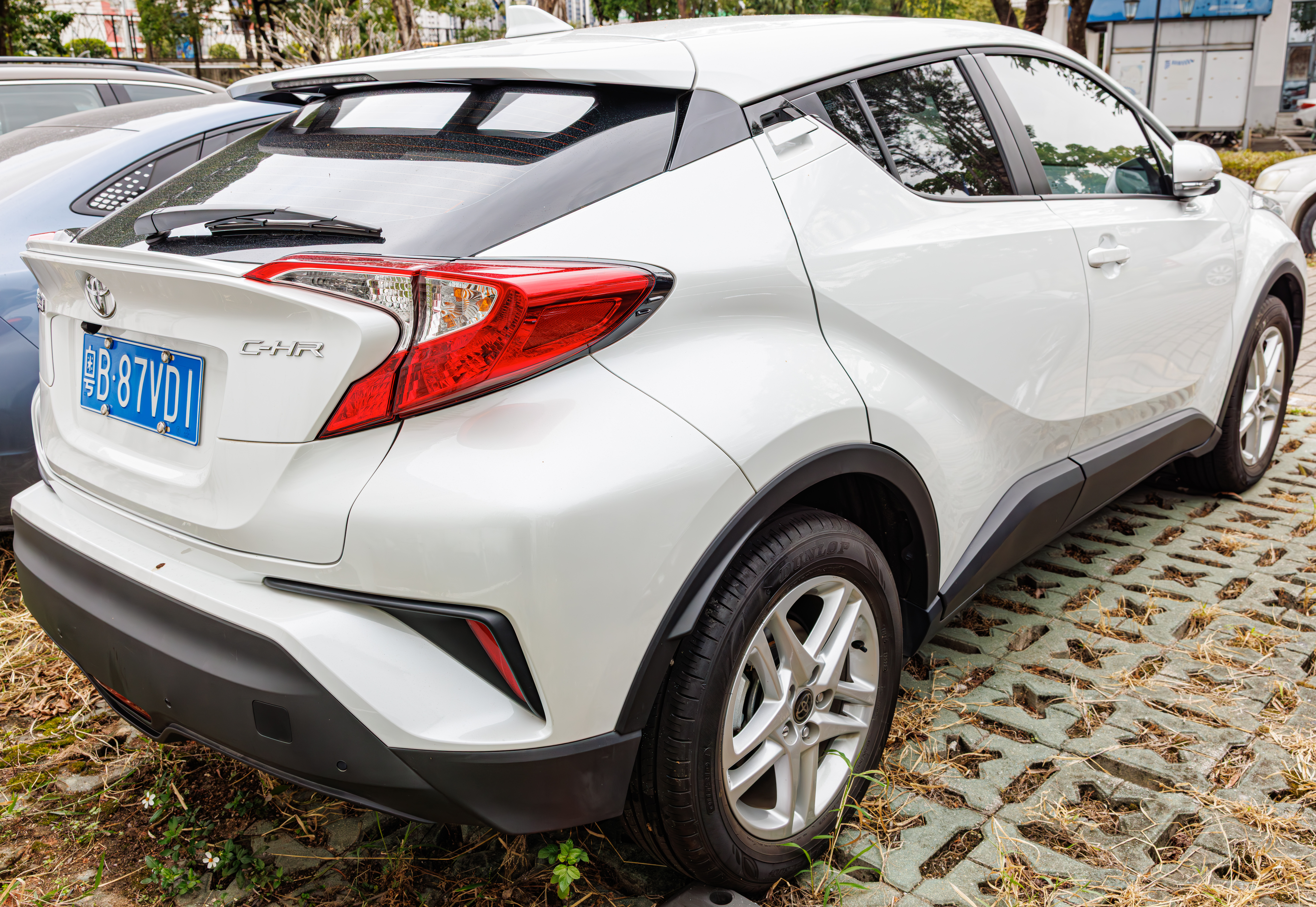
C-HR with a fastback roof sloping, an example of a SUV not marketed as a coupe SUV

Some crossovers may feature similar fastback roof sloping, but are not explicitly marketed as coupe SUVs. Examples are the Tesla Model X and Model Y, Toyota C-HR, Nissan Ariya, and Volvo C40.

Some examples of electric coupe SUVs are the Mahindra BE 6 and XEV 9e, Polestar 4, and Tata Curvv.

== Criticism ==
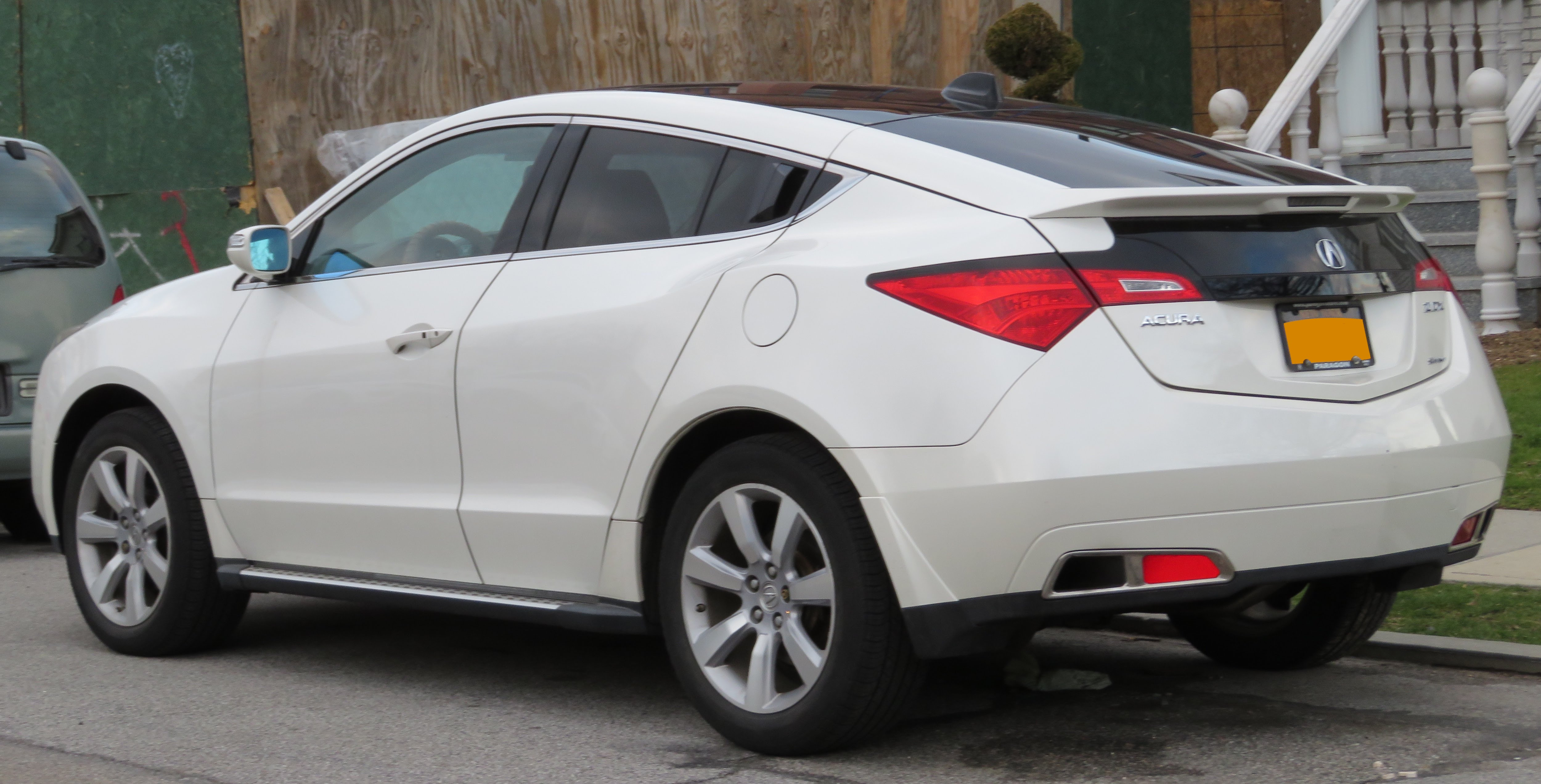
Acura ZDX with its controversial styling

The coupe SUV category has historically attracted criticism due both to its unusual proportions, and its reduced practicality over a standard SUV. Kristen Lee from Jalopnik argued that coupe SUVs "aren’t are [sic] particularly good at any one thing,"

Since its introduction, the exterior design of the BMW X6 has been widely regarded as controversial, as the rear design in particular was said to make the car look "heavy". The first-generation Acura ZDX has received a negative reception from critics and was not a sales success.

Coupe SUVs historically produce fewer sales compared to standard SUVs, however still produce sizable revenue for automakers due to younger customer bases and higher profit margins..

== Gallery ==
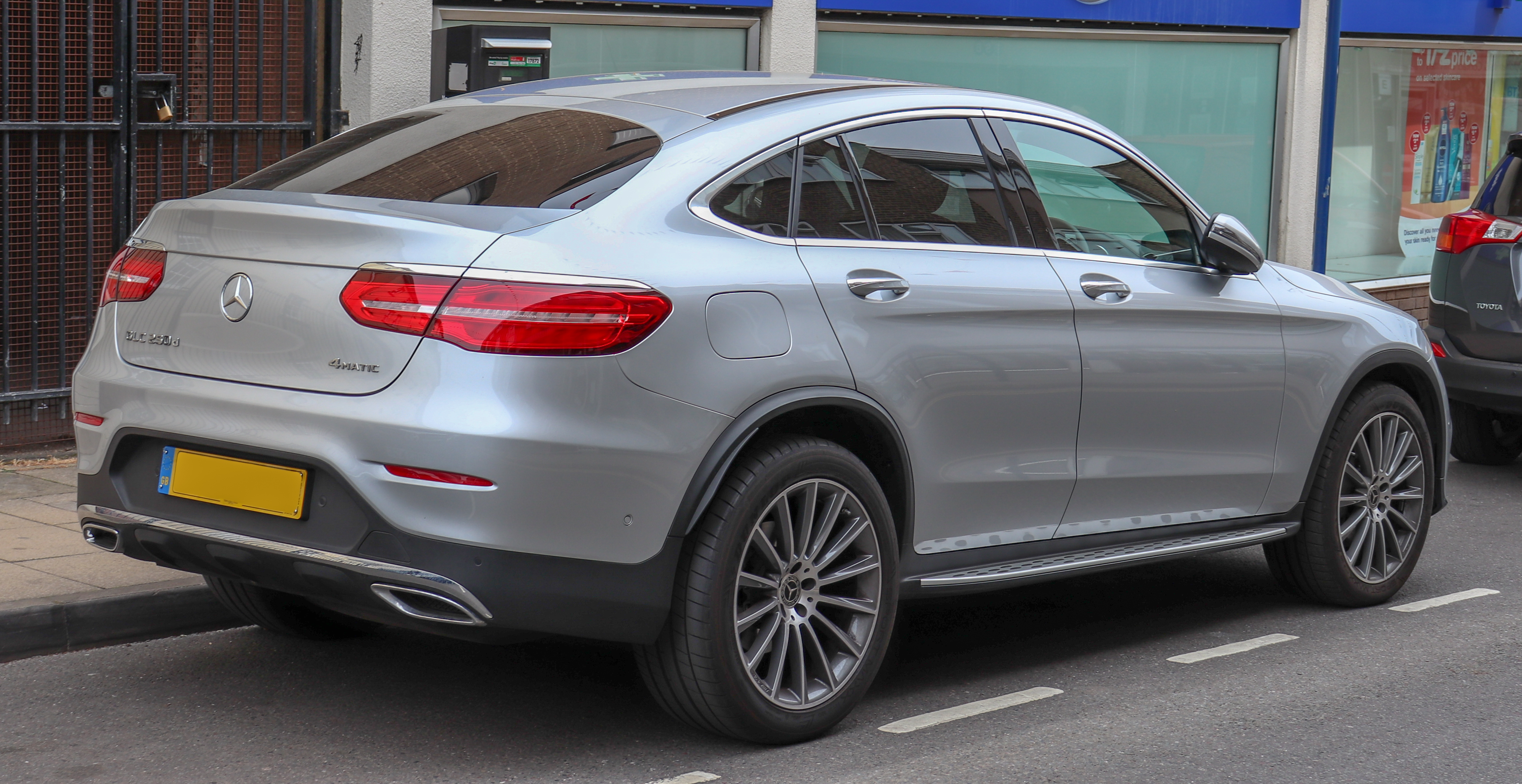
Rear view 2018 Mercedes-Benz GLC Coupé (C253)

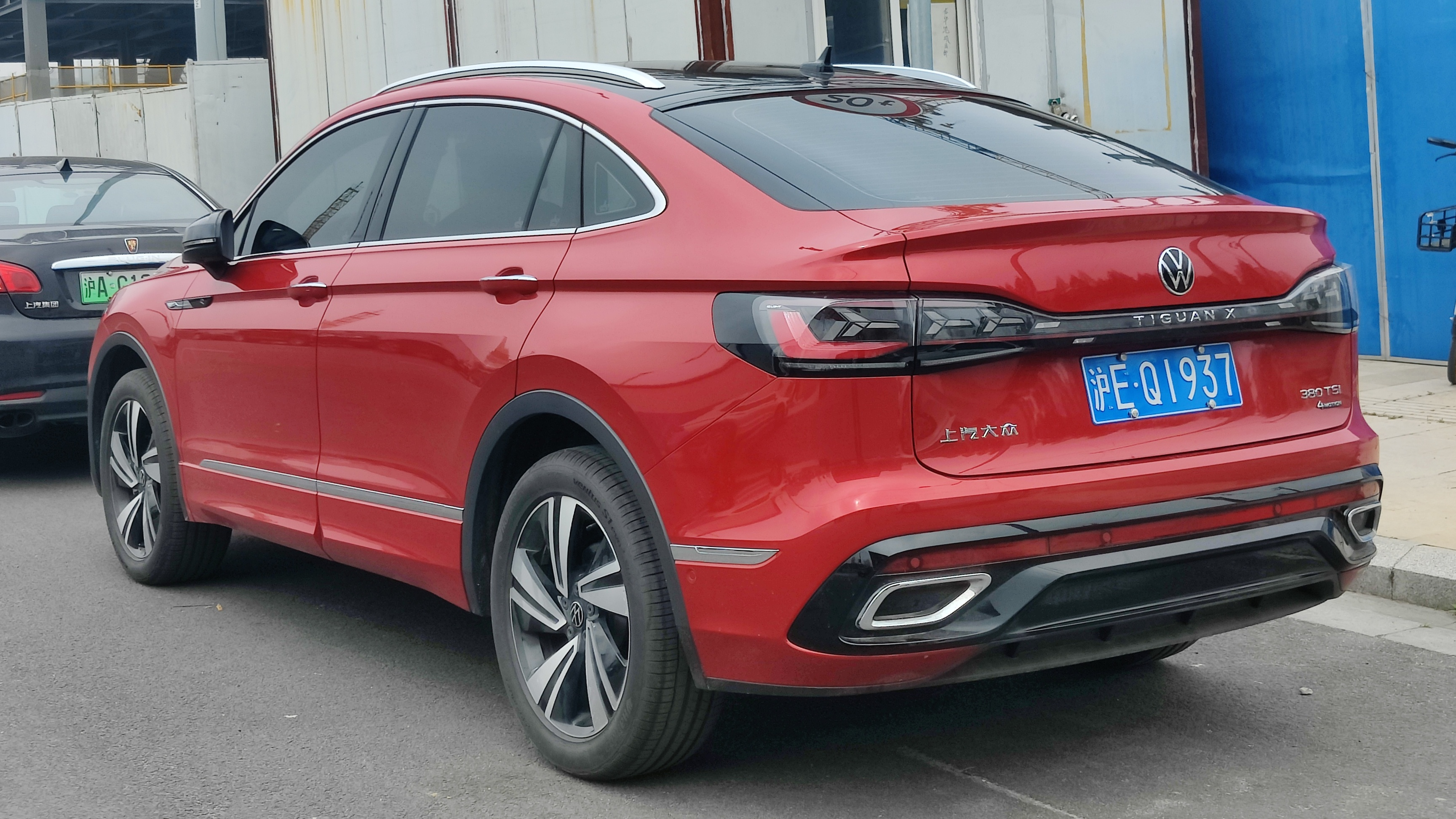
Rear view of 2021 Volkswagen Tiguan X

== See also ==
- Fastback
- Kammback
