= Marc Lichte =

German automobile designer

Mark Lichte
- Born: August 9, 1969 (age 56); Arnsberg, West Germany
- Known for: Head of Audi Design

Marc Lichte is a German automobile designer. He was the head of design at Audi from February 2014 to May 2024.

== Early life ==
He grew up in the north-west region of West Germany.

He studied Transportation Design at a German university.

== Career ==
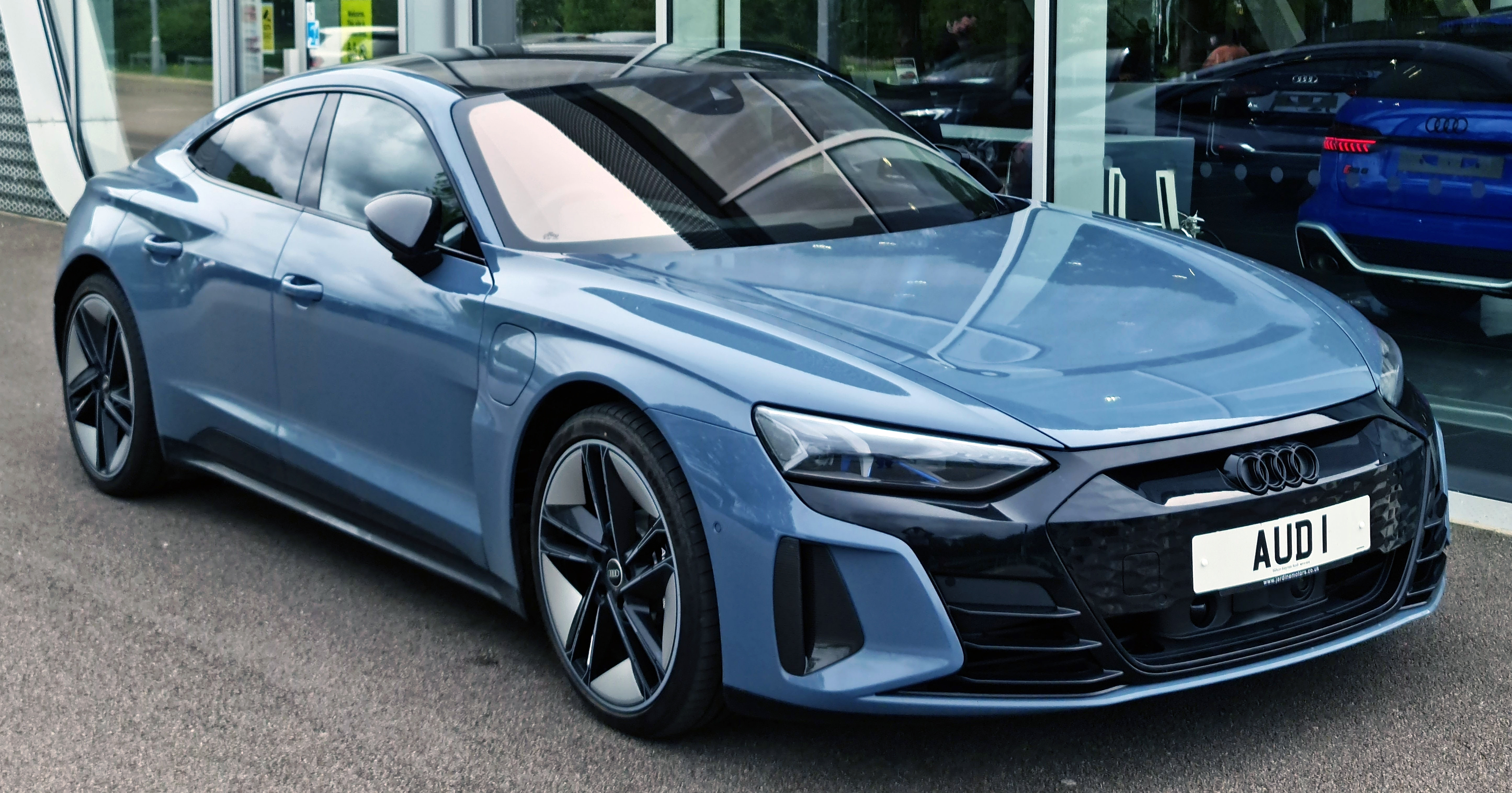
Audi e-tron GT, a design by Lichte

He joined Volkswagen Group in 1996. At VW he was taught by Hartmut Warkuß, the designer of the first Audi 80, and the former head of design at Audi for twenty five years.

=== Work ===
- Audi e-tron GT
- Audi Grandsphere concept
- Volkswagen Golf Mk5
- Volkswagen Golf Mk6
- Volkswagen Golf Mk7
- Volkswagen Passat (B8)
- Volkswagen Arteon

== See also ==
- Jörg Bensinger, developer of Audi's four-wheel transmission
