= Mahindra XEV 9e =

Battery electric mid-size crossover SUV

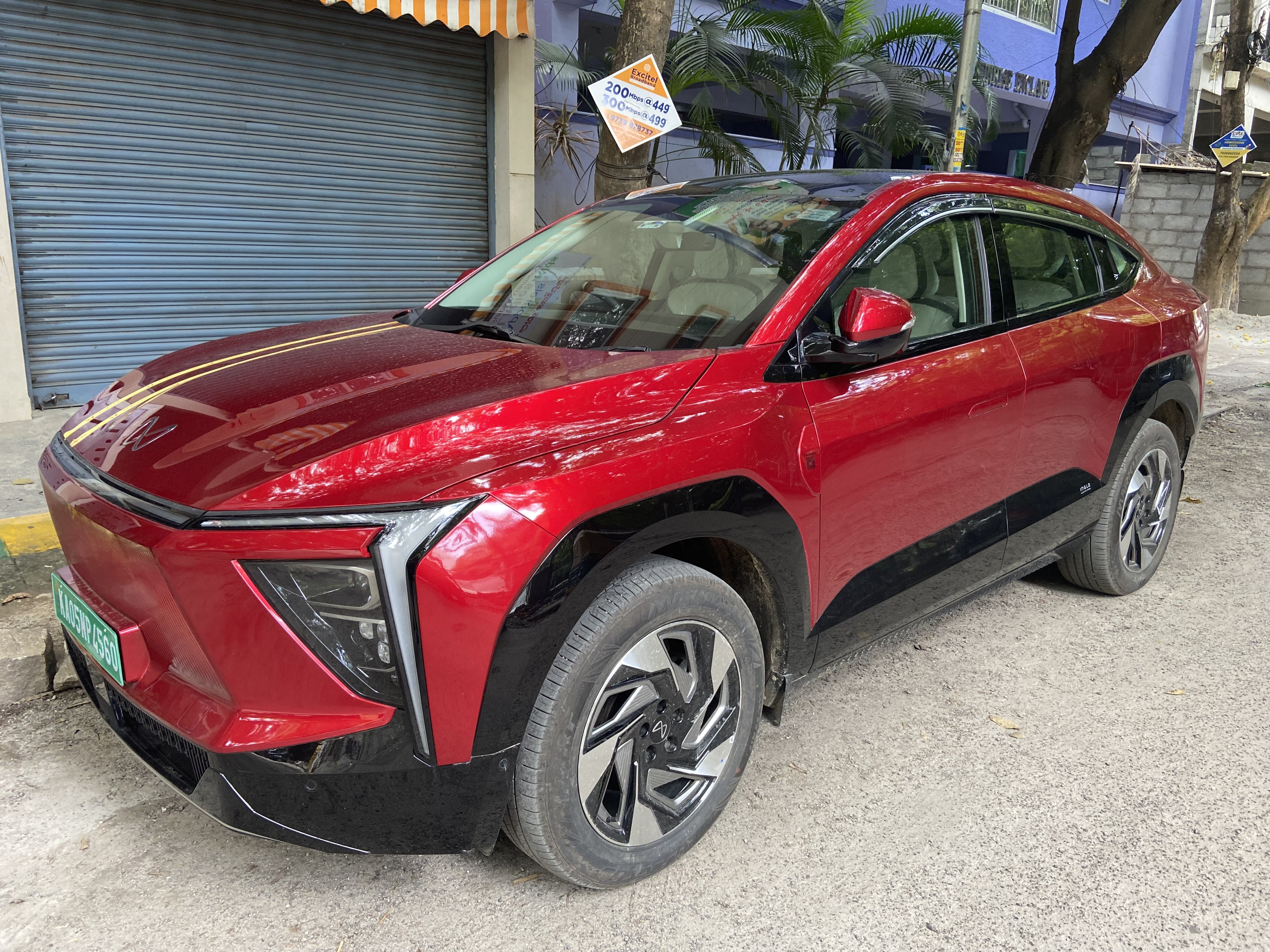

Overview
- Manufacturer: Mahindra & Mahindra
- Production: 2025–present
- Assembly: India

Body and chassis
- Class: Mid-size crossover SUV
- Body style: 5-door coupe SUV
- Layout: Rear-motor, rear-wheel-drive
- Platform: INGLO
- Related: Mahindra BE 6; Mahindra XEV 9S

Powertrain
- Electric motor: Permanent magnet synchronous
- Battery: 59 kWh Blade LFP FinDreams; 79 kWh Blade LFP FinDreams
- Electric range: 542–656 km (337–408 mi) (MIDC); 533 km (331 mi) (WLTP)
- Plug-in charging: 7.2/11.2 kW AC, up to 180 kW DC fast charging

Dimensions
- Wheelbase: 2,775 mm (109.3 in)
- Length: 4,789 mm (188.5 in)
- Width: 1,907 mm (75.1 in)
- Height: 1,694 mm (66.7 in)
- Kerb weight: 2,201 kg (4,852 lb)

The Mahindra XEV 9e is a battery electric mid-size crossover SUV manufactured by Mahindra & Mahindra. Launched in 2024, it is built on the company's INGLO platform and is one of the first models in Mahindra’s new electric SUV lineup.

== Overview ==
Unveiled in 2024, the XEV 9e marked Mahindra’s entry into the premium electric SUV space. It features a coupé-inspired SUV body style and is available in multiple variants with different battery capacities. The vehicle’s price at launch ranged from ₹21.90 lakh to ₹30.50 lakh (ex-showroom, India).

== Design and platform ==
The SUV is built on Mahindra's INGLO skateboard platform, developed specifically for electric vehicles. It features coupe-like styling, a panoramic glass roof, and 19-inch alloy wheels. The vehicle's length is 4,789 mm, and it offers a boot space of 663 litres with split-folding rear seats.

== Powertrain and battery ==
The XEV 9e shares its powertrain with the BE6. It is offered with two lithium iron phosphate (LFP) battery packs: 59 kWh and 79 kWh. Both versions are powered by a permanent magnet synchronous motor driving the rear wheels.

Variant	59kWh, 228hp	79kWh, 282hp
Pack One	Available	Not Available
Pack Two	Available	Available
Pack Three Select	Available	Not Available
Pack Three	Not Available	Available

Battery Options	• 59 kWh • 79 kWh
Power Output	• 59 kWh: 228 hp (170kW), 380Nm • 79 kWh: 282 hp (210kW), 380Nm
Range (MIDC)	• 59 kWh: 542 km • 79 kWh: 656 km
Drivetrain	Rear-wheel drive
Acceleration	0-100km/h in 6.8 seconds
Powertrain	3-in-1 integrated powertrain
Steering	Electric power steering with variable gear ratio
Turning Circle Diameter	10m
Front Suspension	McPherson Strut I-Link Independent suspension and stabiliser bar
Rear Suspension	Multi-Link (5-link) independent suspension and stabiliser bar
Dampers	Pack 1 / 2 - Passive Suspension Pack 3 Select / 3 - Adaptive Suspension
Brakes	Disc (front and rear)

The vehicle supports AC charging via 7.2 kW or 11.2 kW wall boxes and can be charged using 180 kW DC fast chargers. The battery cells are supplied by BYD and use their Blade Battery technology.

=== Charging times ===
Battery Option	7.2kW AC Charger (0-100%)	11.2kW AC Charger (0-100%)	DC Fast Charger (20-80)
59 kWh	8.7 hours	6 hours	20 minutes (140kW)
79 kWh	11.7 hours	8 hours	20 minutes (180kW)

== Interior and features ==
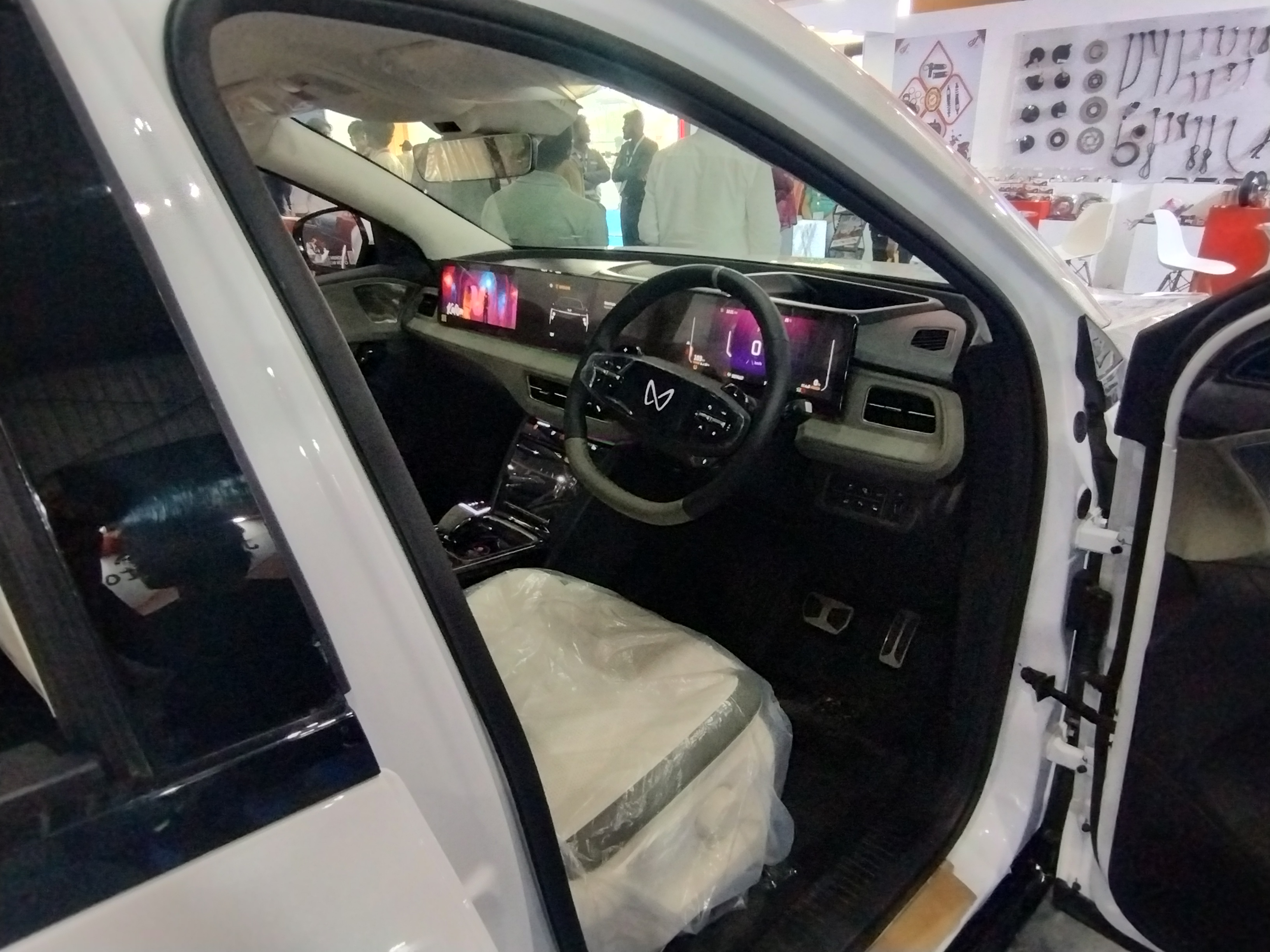
Interior of the XEV 9e

The interior features three 12.3-inch screens for the driver, infotainment, and front passenger. Other features include:

- Connected car technology
- Wireless phone charging
- Dual-zone automatic climate control
- Panoramic sunroof
- 16-speaker, 1400W Harman Kardon audio system
- Over-the-air updates

== Safety ==
Safety features include:

- Seven airbags
- Electronic stability control
- Hill hold assist
- ISOFIX child seat anchors
- Level 2 ADAS with adaptive cruise control, lane keep assist, and emergency braking

The XEV 9e for India was rated 5 Star in Bharat NCAP (based on Latin NCAP 2016) in 2025.

Bharat NCAP test results Mahindra XEV 9e (2023, based on Latin NCAP 2016)
Test	Score	Stars
Adult occupant protection	32.00/32.00	5 /5 stars
Child occupant protection	45.00/49.00	5 /5 stars

== Performance ==
Mahindra claims that the higher-end variant can accelerate from 0–100 km/h in 6.8 seconds. The car features adjustable regenerative braking (3 levels with one pedal drive) , multiple drive modes (Default, Range, Everyday, Race and Snow), and a 360-degree camera system.

== Paint shades ==
The XEV 9e is available in 8 single-tone colours: Deep Forest (Green), Nebula Blue, Tango Red, Desert Myst (Beige), Ruby Velvet, Everest White and Stealth Black.

== Sales ==
According to Mahindra, over 10,000 units of the XEV 9e and its sibling model, the Mahindra BE 6, were sold within 70 days of launch.

== Market position ==
The Mahindra XEV 9e competes with other electric SUVs in India, including the Tata Harrier EV and the BYD Atto 3.

== Warranty ==
The HV battery pack comes with a lifetime warranty for the first owner if the car is privately registered. In case of change of ownership, warranty coverage is 10 years or 2,00,000km from vehicle's first delivery date, whichever occurs first.

== See also ==
- Plug-in electric vehicles in India
