= Mahindra BE 6 =

2024 electric coupe SUV from Mahindra

Overview
- Manufacturer: Mahindra & Mahindra
- Production: 2024–present
- Assembly: India
- Designer: Pininfarina

Body and chassis
- Class: Subcompact crossover SUV
- Body style: 5-door coupe SUV
- Layout: Rear-motor, rear-wheel-drive
- Platform: INGLO
- Related: Mahindra XEV 9e; Mahindra XEV 9S

Powertrain
- Electric motor: 3-in-1 integrated powertrain
- Power output: 228 hp (170 kW; 231 PS), 380 Nm (59 kWh battery pack); 282 hp (210 kW; 286 PS), 380 Nm (79 kWh battery pack)
- Battery: 59 kWh; 79 kWh (BYD-sourced)
- Electric range: 556 km (345 mi) (ARAI, 59 kWh); 682 km (424 mi) (ARAI, 79 kWh)

Dimensions
- Wheelbase: 2,775 mm (109.3 in)
- Length: 4,371 mm (172.1 in)
- Width: 1,907 mm (75.1 in)
- Height: 1,627 mm (64.1 in)
- Curb weight: 1,907 kg (4,204 lb)

The Mahindra BE 6 is an electric subcompact crossover coupe SUV produced by Mahindra & Mahindra. Based on the INGLO electric vehicle platform, the vehicle was introduced in 2024, along with the XEV 9e, and is one of the first models in Mahindra’s new electric SUV lineup.

== History ==
Mahindra initially unveiled the BE 6 as BE 6e, but on 6 December 2024 there was a trademark dispute between IndiGo and Mahindra for the suffix "6E", which is IndiGo's IATA code, used in the car name. Mahindra then renamed the car from BE 6e to BE 6.

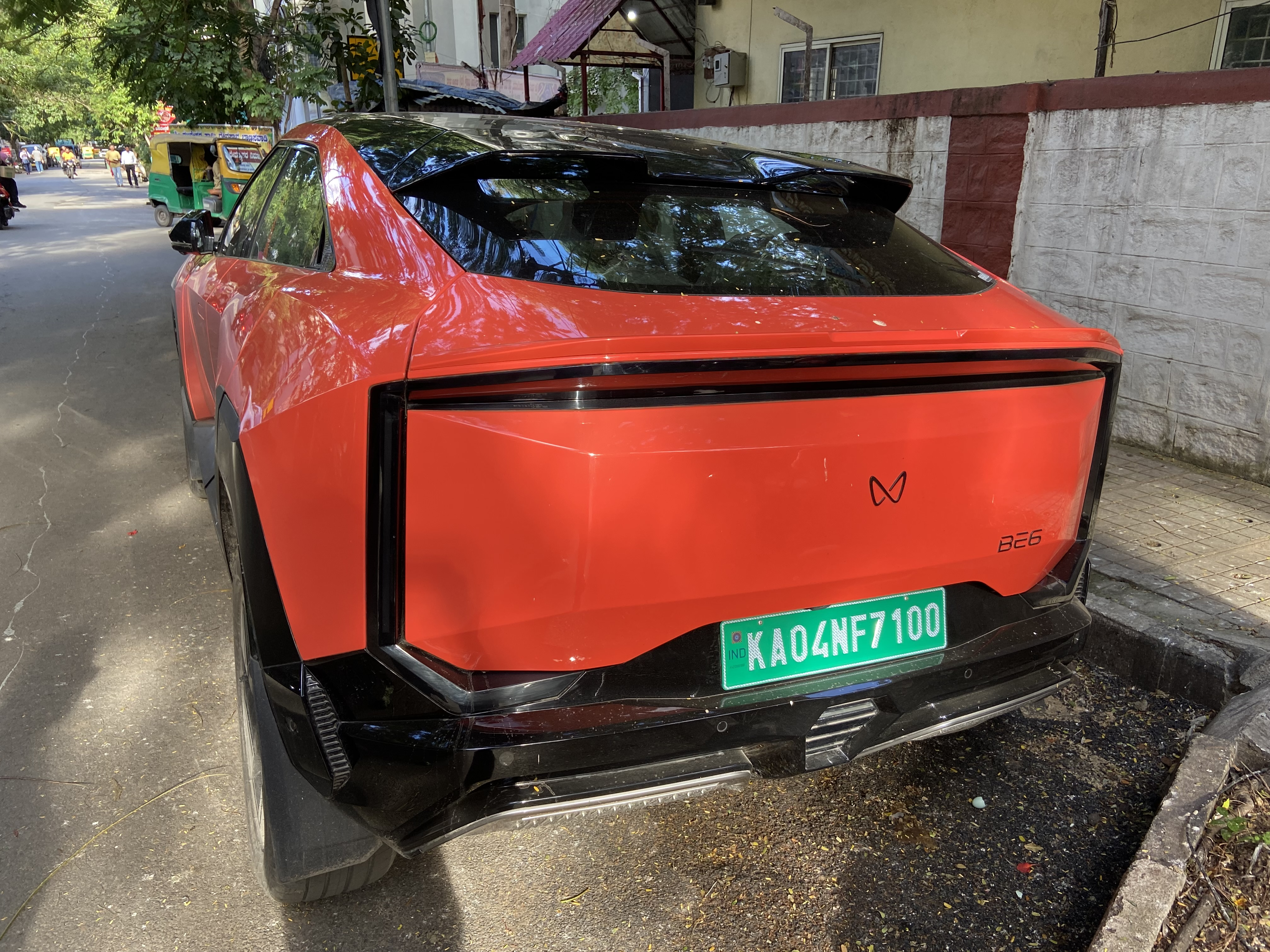
Rear view

Mahindra launched the BE 6 Batman Edition on 15 August 2025 in collaboration with Warner Bros. Discovery with production limited to 999 units, all of which were sold out in 135 seconds after bookings opened. Deliveries began on International Batman Day. Mahindra again came up with 999 units of Batman Edition in March, 2026 at Rs 28.49 lakh (ex-showroom), which was reserved in just 7 minutes after booking opened.

Mahindra launched the BE 6 Formula E Edition (FE2) on 27 November 2025, claiming it to be world’s first Formula E-themed special-edition SUV, with a starting price of Rs.23.69 lakh.

In August 2026, Mahindra updated the BE 6 lineup with the launch of the BE 6 Sporteq variant series starting at ₹19.45 lakh (ex-showroom). The update introduced a revised variant structure, a new 70kWh battery option joining the 59kWh and 79kWh models, a triple 12.3-inch screen dashboard layout, and a Battery as a Service (BaaS) ownership model.

Mahindra has also said that some of these new software features will gradually be made available to existing BE 6, XEV 9e and XEV 9S owners through OTA updates from January 2027, depending on the model and variant. TEQ_Talk: Lets you interact with the car using AI-powered voice assistance, with different agents designed to help with various tasks. TEQ_Play: Brings more entertainment inside the car, including games, karaoke and support for Dolby Vision and Dolby Atmos. TEQ_Drive: Offers additional driving features, including customisable drive modes, Drift Mode and Tribe Drive. TEQ_Me: Recognises the user and automatically loads their saved preferences and settings. TEQ_Secure: Adds extra security features, including 360-degree monitoring, intrusion alerts and digital key support. TEQ_xting: Allows owners to display personalised messages on the rear of the vehicle.

== Variants and pricing ==
The BE 6 is offered in five variants with pricing ranging from ₹18.90 lakh to ₹26.90 lakh (ex-showroom). Chargers are available at additional cost: ₹50,000 for a 7.2 kW unit and ₹75,000 for an 11.2 kW unit.

Variant	Price (ex-showroom, INR)	Deliveries Starting
Pack One 59 KWH	₹18.90 lakh	August 2025
Pack One Above 59 KWH	₹20.50 lakh	August 2025
Pack Two 59 KWH	₹21.90 lakh	July 2025
Pack Two 79 KWH	₹23.50 lakh	
Pack Three Select 59 KWH	₹24.50 lakh	June 2025
Pack Three 79 KWH	₹26.90 lakh	Mid-March 2025

=== Mahindra BE 6 Formula-E Edition ===
Mahindra BE 6 FE Edition launched in India on 27 November 2025, at Rs 23.69 Lakh.

== Performance ==
Feature	Specification
Battery Options	• 59 kWh (Pack One to Pack Three Select) • 79 kWh BYD-sourced (Pack Three only)
Power Output	• 59 kWh: 228 hp (170 kW), 380 Nm • 79 kWh: 282 hp (210 kW), 380 Nm
Range (ARAI)	• 59 kWh: 556 km • 79 kWh: 683 km
Drivetrain	Rear-wheel drive
Acceleration	0-100 km/h in 6.7 seconds
Powertrain	3-in-1 integrated powertrain
Steering	Electric Power Steering with Variable Gear Ratio
Turning Circle	10 m diameter
Driving Features	• Multiple Driving Modes • Multi-step regeneration • One-touch Single Pedal Drive • Brake-by-wire technology

=== Charging times ===
Battery Size	7.2 kW AC Charger (0-100%)	11 kW AC Charger (0-100%)	DC Fast Charger (20-80%)
59 kWh	8.7 hours	6 hours	20 minutes (140 kW)
79 kWh	11.7 hours	8 hours	20 minutes (180 kW)

== Sales ==
The BE 6 recorded 934 units sold in March 2025, followed by 550 units in April 2025. Together with the XEV 9e, the model has accumulated 30,179 bookings as reported in early 2025. After April 2025 it is showing increase in sale numbers month on month. Mahindra sold 30000 of its Electric vehicles (both the BE 6 and XEV 9e combined) since their launch in 7 months.

== Design ==
=== Exterior features ===
Feature	Pack One	Pack One Above	Pack Two	Pack Three Select	Pack Three
Headlamp Type	Bi-LED with DRLs	Bi-LED with DRLs	Bi-LED with DRLs	C-shaped LED DRLs	C-shaped LED DRLs
Tail-lamp Type	LED	LED	LED	C-shaped LED	C-shaped LED
Wheels	R18 with aero covers	R19 with aero covers	R19 with aero covers	R19 alloy	R19 alloy
Fixed glass roof	No	Yes	Yes	Yes	Yes
Sequential turn indicators	No	No	Yes	Yes	Yes
Front fog & cornering lamps	No	No	Yes	Yes	Yes
Electric flush door handles	No	No	No	Yes	Yes
Ambient lighting (16M colors)	No	No	No	No	Yes

=== Interior features ===
Feature	Pack One	Pack One Above	Pack Two	Pack Three Select	Pack Three
Upholstery	Fabric	Fabric	Fabric	Leatherette	Leatherette
Interior trim	Standard	Standard	Soft fabric-wrapped	Soft leatherette-wrapped	Soft leatherette-wrapped
Steering wheel material	Standard	Standard	Standard	Leatherette	Leatherette
Touch switches	No	No	No	Yes	Yes

== Safety ==
The BE 6 received a 5-star rating from Bharat NCAP (based on Latin NCAP 2016), with scores of 31.97/32 for Adult Occupant Protection and 45/49 for Child Occupant Protection.

Bharat NCAP test results Mahindra BE 6 (2025, based on Latin NCAP 2016)
Test	Score	Stars
Adult occupant protection	31.97/32.00	5 /5 stars
Child occupant protection	45.00/49.00	5 /5 stars

Feature	Pack One	Pack One Above	Pack Two	Pack Three Select	Pack Three
Airbag configuration	6 airbags	6 airbags	6 airbags	7 airbags (incl. knee)	7 airbags (incl. knee)
Brake system	All-wheel disc, brake-by-wire	All-wheel disc, brake-by-wire	All-wheel disc, brake-by-wire	All-wheel disc, brake-by-wire	All-wheel disc, brake-by-wire
Driver drowsiness detection	Yes	Yes	Yes	Yes	Yes
Tire pressure monitoring	Basic indicator	Individual tire display	Individual tire display	Individual tire display	Individual tire display
ADAS features	No	No	Level 2 (1 radar, 1 camera)	Level 2 (1 radar, 1 camera)	Level 2 (5 radars, 1 camera)
360-degree camera	No	No	No	Yes	Yes
Auto parking	No	No	No	Yes	Yes

== Technology ==
The BE 6 features the MAIA (Mahindra Artificial Intelligence Architecture) system, utilising a Qualcomm Snapdragon 8295 chipset with 24 GB RAM and 128 GB storage.

Feature	Pack One	Pack One Above	Pack Two	Pack Three Select	Pack Three
Display configuration	Twin 12.3-inch screens	Twin 12.3-inch screens	Twin 12.3-inch screens	Twin 12.3-inch screens	Twin 12.3-inch screens
Connectivity	5G, wireless Android Auto & Apple CarPlay	5G, wireless Android Auto & Apple CarPlay	5G, wireless Android Auto & Apple CarPlay	5G, wireless Android Auto & Apple CarPlay	5G, wireless Android Auto & Apple CarPlay
Audio system	4 speakers, 2 tweeters	4 speakers, 2 tweeters	16-speaker Harman Kardon	16-speaker Harman Kardon	16-speaker Harman Kardon
Wireless charging	No	Front row	Front row	Dual front row	Dual front row
Additional features	-	Auto-dimming IRVM	NFC key, Dolby Atmos	Video calling, VR LED air filtration	Video calling, VR LED air filtration

== Market positioning ==
The BE 6 competes in the mid-size electric SUV segment with the Maruti e-Vitara, Tata Curvv EV, Hyundai Creta EV, Tesla Model Y (in terms of features) and MG ZS EV.

== Warranty ==
The high voltage battery warranty applies to first registered owners with private registration. For subsequent owners, warranty coverage is 10 years or 200,000 km from the vehicle's first delivery date, whichever occurs first.

== See also ==
- Plug-in electric vehicles in India
- Mahindra XEV 9S
