= Iancu =

Iancu may refer to:

== Surname ==
- Andrei Iancu (born 1968), American engineer and intellectual property attorney
- Aurel Iancu (born 1928), Romanian economist, member of the Romanian Academy
- Avram Iancu (1824–1872), Transylvanian Romanian revolutionary
- Constantin Iancu (bobsleigh) (born 1948), Romanian bobsledder
- Costel Iancu, Romanian politician who has been involved in a scandal
- Gabriel Iancu (born 1994), Romanian professional footballer
- Ionuț Iancu (born 1994), Romanian handballer
- Iulius Iancu (1920–2013), Jewish poet and writer writing in Romanian
- Marcel Hermann Iancu (1895–1984), Romanian and Israeli visual artist, architect and art theorist
- Marian Iancu (born 1965), Romanian businessman, president of oil company Balkan Petroleum (UK) Ltd
- Marius Iancu (born 1976), Romanian singer and DJ (stage name Morris)
- Vlad Iancu (born 1978), Romanian futsal player

== Given name ==
- Iancu Dumitrescu (born 1944), Romanian avant-garde composer
- Iancu Flondor (1865–1924), Romanian politician who advocated Bukovina's unifion with the Kingdom of Romania
- Iancu Jianu (1787–1842), Wallachian Romanian hajduk
- Iancu Kalinderu (1840–1913), Wallachian, later Romanian jurist and confidant of King Carol I
- Iancu Manu (1803–1874), Romanian boyar and politician
- Iancu Sasul (died 1582), the bastard son of Petru Rareș and the wife of Brașov Transylvanian Saxon Iorg (Jürgen) Weiss
- Iancu Țucărman (1922–2021), Romanian Jewish agricultural engineer and Holocaust survivor
- Iancu Văcărescu (1786–1863), Romanian Wallachian boyar and poet, member of the Văcărescu family
- Iancu Constantin Vissarion (1879–1951), Romanian prose writer

== See also ==
- Ianchuk
- Iancului
- Jianchu (disambiguation)
