= Constantin Iancu =

Constantin Iancu may refer to:

- Costel Iancu, Romanian politician
- Constantin Iancu (bobsleigh) (born 1948), Romanian bobsledder
- Constantin Iancu (footballer), Romanian footballer
