= Yanchuk =

Yanchuk (Ukrainian: Янчук) is a gender-neutral Ukrainian surname that may refer to

- Dmytro Yanchuk (born 1992), Ukrainian sprint canoeist
- Olha Yanchuk (born 1995), Ukrainian tennis player, sister of Yelyzaveta
- Pavlo Yanchuk (born 1986), Ukrainian football defender
- Yelyzaveta Yanchuk (born 1993), Ukrainian tennis player
- Vadim Yanchuk (born 1982), Russian football player

== See also ==
- Ianchuk
