= Volkswagen Group E platform =

Overview
- Manufacturer: Volkswagen Group
- Production: 2002–2018

Body and chassis
- Class: Full-size luxury SUV; Mid-size luxury crossover SUV
- Layout: Longitudinal Front-engine, all-wheel-drive

Chronology
- Successor: MLB evo platform

The Volkswagen Group E platform was a series of automobile platforms shared among multiple marques of sport utility vehicles (SUVs) (4x4s in the European market). It was co-developed by Volkswagen Group and Porsche AG. All platform users shared the Volkswagen Bratislava Plant in Slovakia, with the Porsche Cayenne having final assembly at the Porsche plant at Leipzig.

== PL71 platform vehicles ==
- Volkswagen Touareg (Typ 7L) (2002–2010)
- Porsche Cayenne (Typ 9PA) (2002–2010)
- Audi Q7 (Typ 4L) (2005–2015)

== PL72 platform vehicles ==
- Volkswagen Touareg (Typ 7P) (2010–2018)
- Porsche Cayenne (Typ 92A) (2010–2018)
