= Rainer Zietlow =

German driver

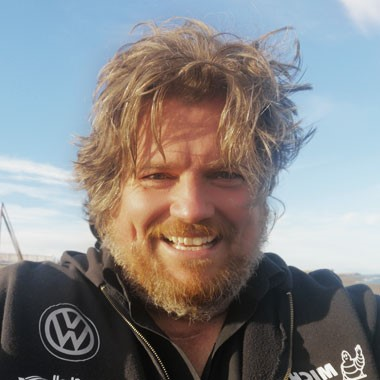
Rainer Zietlow 2019

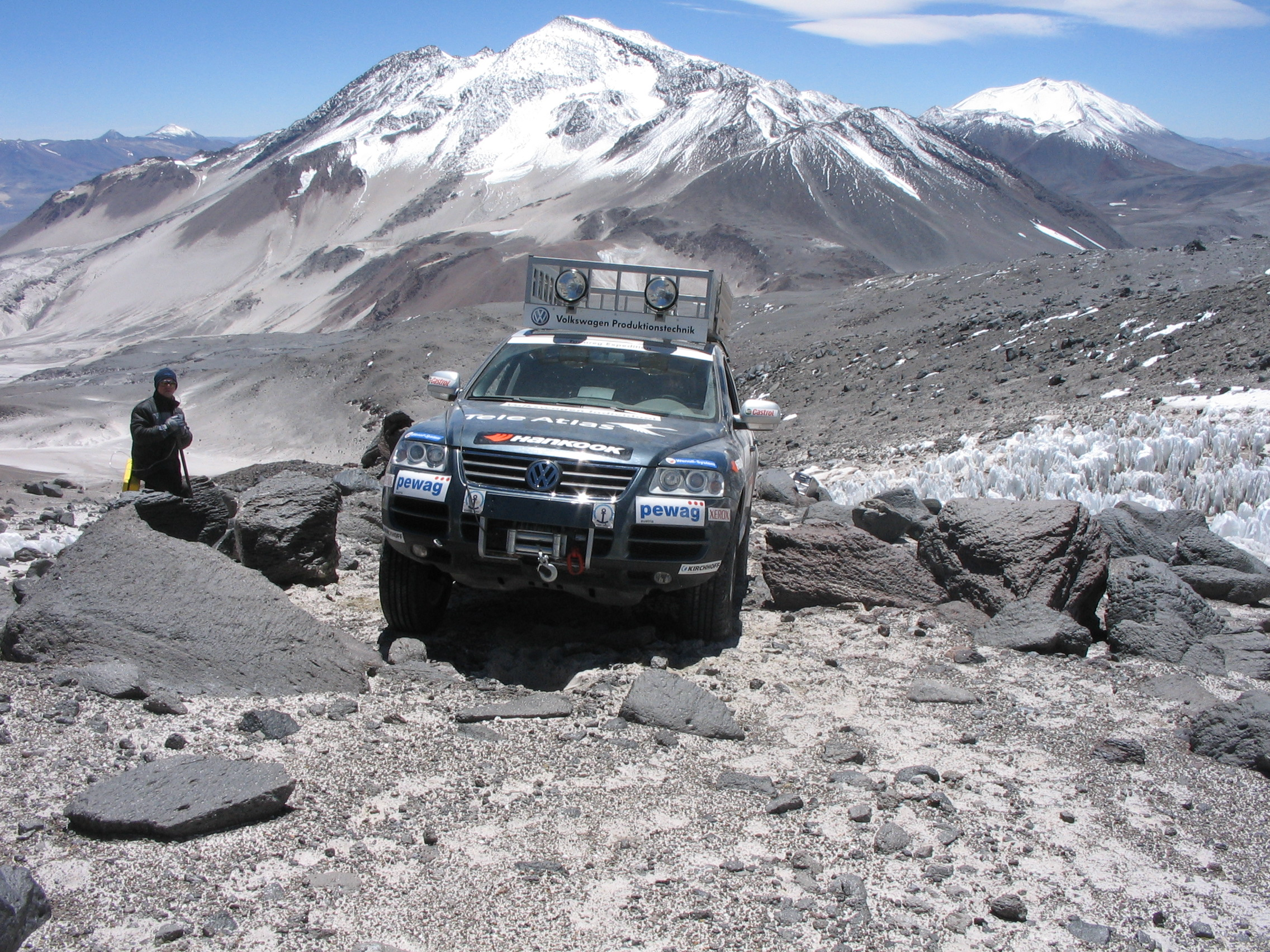
World Altitude Record 2005

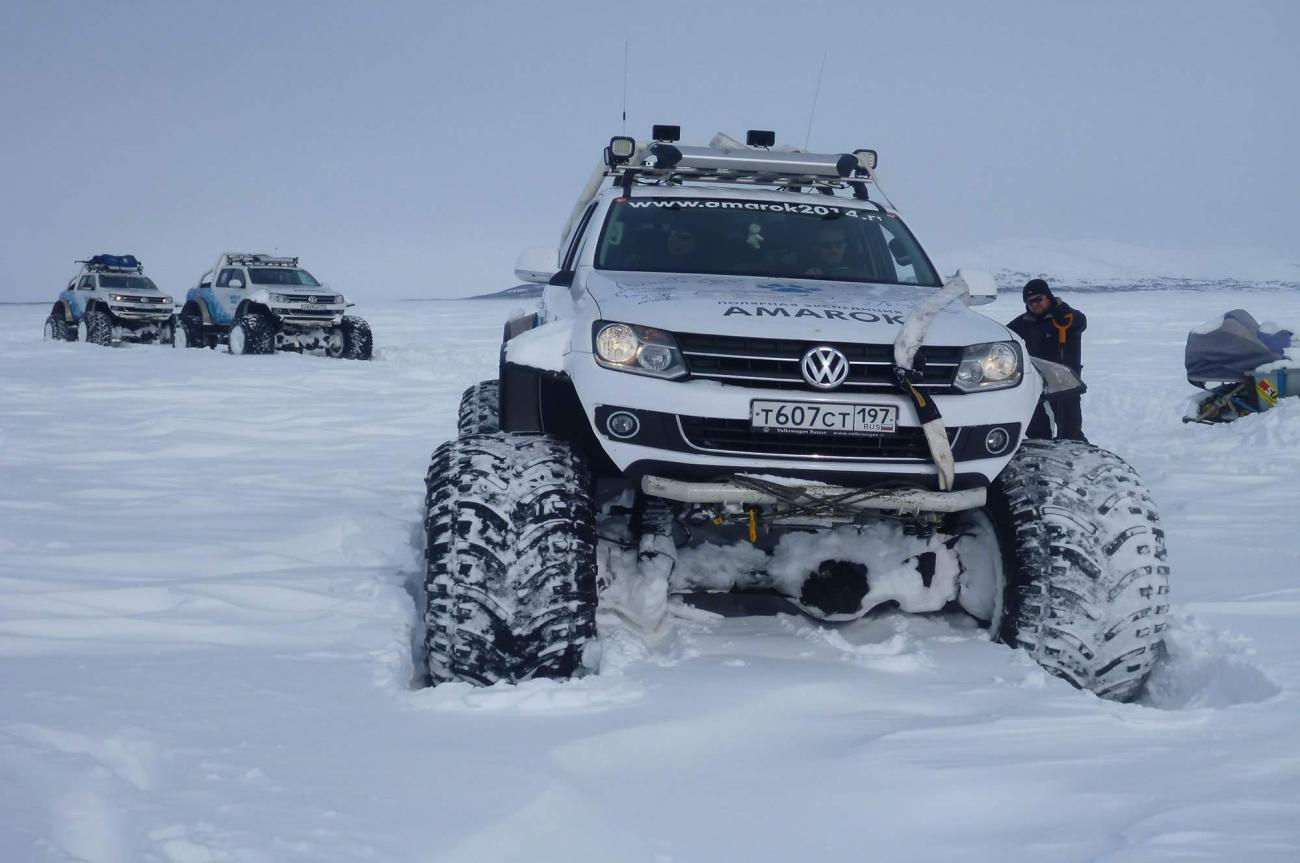
Amarok Polar Expedition 2013

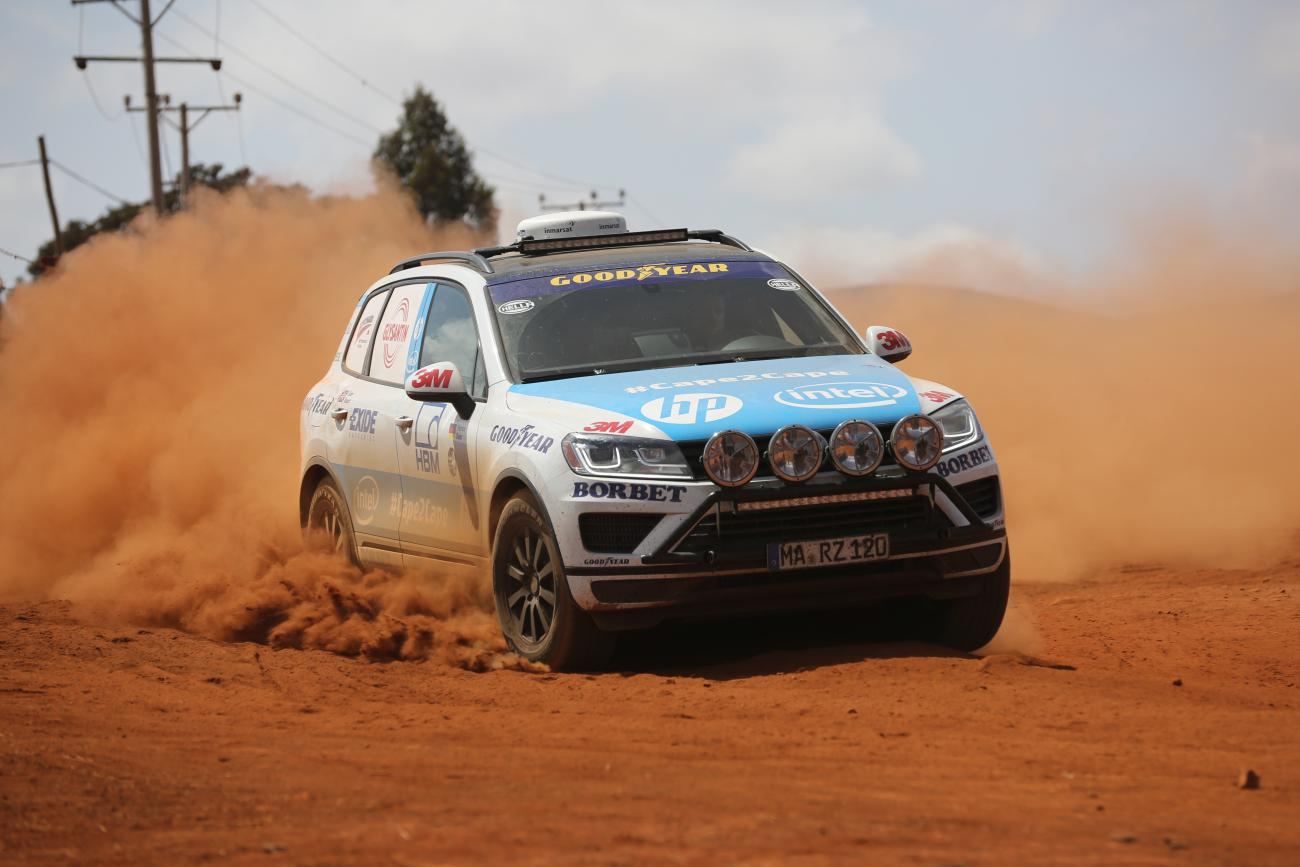
From South Africa to Norway 2015

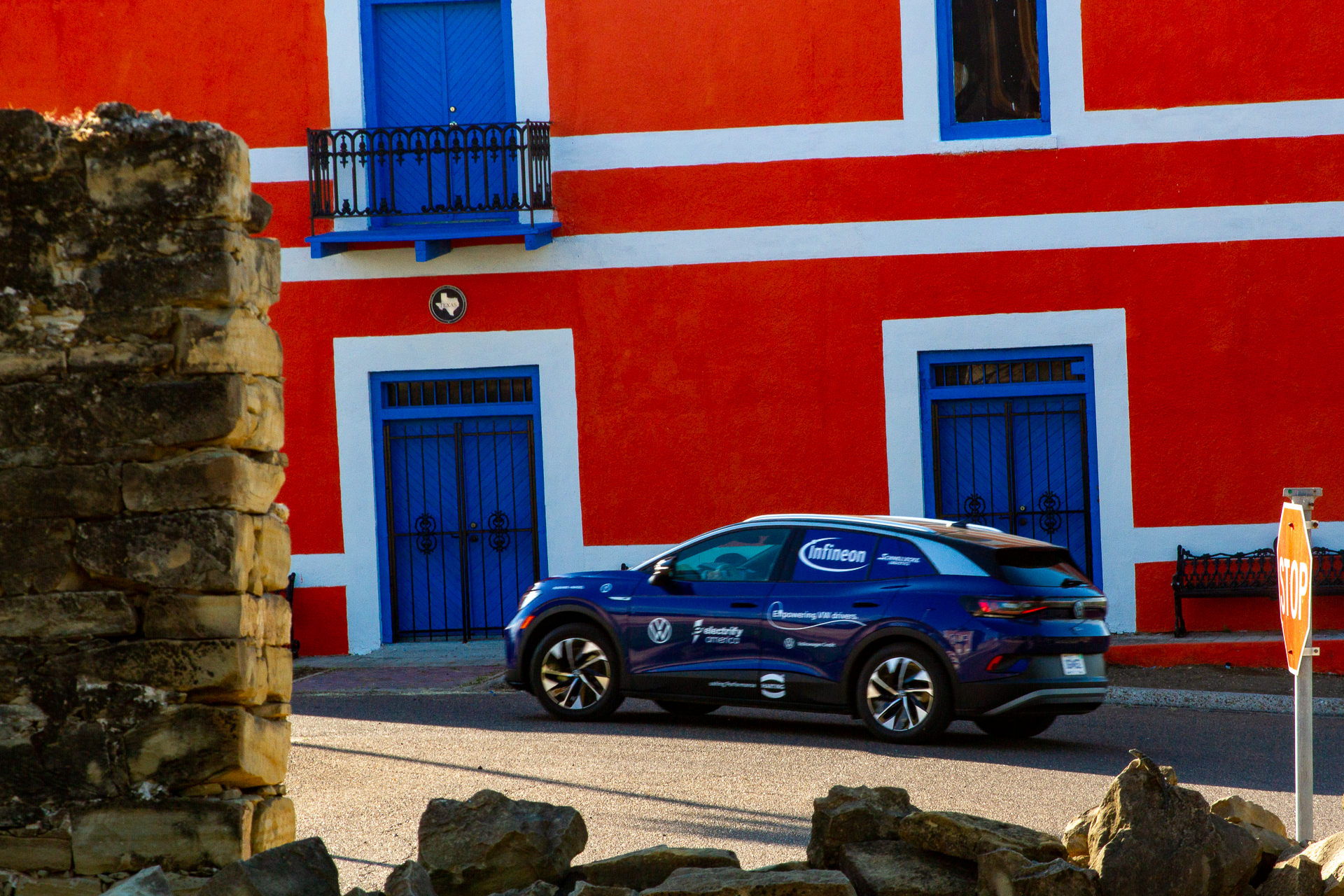
VW ID.4 USA Tour 2021

Rainer Zietlow (German pronunciation: [ˈʁaɪnɐ ˈtsiːtloː]) is a German world record holder, long distance driver and owner of the Challenge4 agency in Mannheim, Germany. Seven of his long-distance records and two altitude records are or were officially registered at Guinness World Records.

== Activities ==
In 1988 Rainer Zietlow crossed the Sahara to Niger in a Mercedes 230. In 1990 he crossed the Sahara to Cameroon in a Toyota Land Cruiser BJ 55. In 1996 Rainer Zietlow drove around the world in a Land Rover Defender 110 in six months.

== Challenge4 ==
In 2004 Rainer Zietlow founded the agency Challenge4 GmbH. It specializes in the planning and realization of international long-distance and record-breaking tours. Since 2005, the agency has run 20 successful projects.

== SOS Children's Village ==
With a few exceptions, Rainer Zietlow has supported the international children's aid organization SOS Children's Villages since 2004 with each of his world record or long-distance tours by handing over a donation during a village visit on site.

== World record and long distance rides (2005 to present) ==
Year	Tour	Team
1996	Round-the-world trip visiting all cities with the name “Coburg” in a Land Rover Defender.	Rainer Zietlow
2005	Guinness World Record for reaching a height of 6,081 m (19,951 ft) at Ojos del Salado in Chile's Atacama Desert with a standard Volkswagen Touareg.	Rainer Zietlow, Ronald Bormann, Ingo Barensche, Matthias Merz, Florian Hilpert, Steffen Schmidt, Stefan Urlass, Hans-Jürgen Cordes
2006/2007	Guinness World Record for the first circumnavigation of the globe across six continents in a car powered only by natural gas, a Volkswagen Caddy EcoFuel. This included crossing Australia for the first time in a natural gas vehicle that was not registered in Australia. Distance: around 45,000 km (28,000 mi).	Rainer Zietlow, Franz Janusiewicz, Florian Hilpert, Falk Gunold
2007	Long-distance trip from Berlin, Germany, to Bangkok, Thailand, in a natural gas-powered Volkswagen Caddy EcoFuel. This included crossing China for the first time in a natural gas vehicle that was not registered in China. Distance: around 22,000 km (14,000 mi).	Rainer Zietlow, Franz Janusiewicz
2009	Visiting all 800 natural gas filling stations within Germany in 80 days in a natural gas-powered Volkswagen Passat TSI EcoFuel. Distance: around 23,700 km (14,700 mi).	Rainer Zietlow, Franz Janusiewicz
2009	First crossing of the Eurasian continent from the Atlantic (Cabo da Roca) via Russia to the Pacific (Tokyo) in a natural gas-powered Volkswagen Caddy Maxi EcoFuel. In the process, Japan was crossed for the first time in a natural gas vehicle that was not registered in Japan. Distance: around 15,000 km (9,300 mi)	Rainer Zietlow, Franz Janusiewicz, Benny Wagener, Roman Huber, Leopold Freund
2010	Long-distance journey along the Pan-American Highway from Ushuaia, Argentina, to Deadhorse, Alaska, in a natural gas-powered Volkswagen Caddy Maxi EcoFuel. This was the first time the Pan-American Highway was driven continuously by a natural gas vehicle. Distance: around 35,000 km (22,000 mi).	Rainer Zietlow, Marius Biela
2011	First world record drive on the Pan-American Highway from Ushuaia, Argentina, to Deadhorse, Alaska, with a Volkswagen Touareg. Vehicle and team were flown over the Darien jungle from Cartagena, Colombia, to Panama City, Panama. Distance: around 23,000 km (14,000 mi) in 11 days and 17 hours.	Rainer Zietlow, Marius Biela, Carlos Fernandez
2012	World record trip from Melbourne, Australia, to the twin city of Saint Petersburg, Russia, in a Volkswagen Touareg. Vehicle and team were flown between Darwin and Dilli, East Timor, and shipped between Indonesia and Malaysia on a wooden boat. Distance: around 23,000 km (14,000 mi) in 17 days and 18 hours.	Rainer Zietlow, Marius Biela, Vadim Gagarin
2013	Guinness World Record for the "Amarok Polar Expedition" a 60-day journey in Russia from Moscow to Petropavlovsk-Kamchatsky with three converted Volkswagen Amaroks as part of a promotional tour for the Winter Olympics in Sochi 2014. Distance: around 16,000 km (9,900 mi).	Rainer Zietlow, Gannadij Paramonov, Alexey Vorobiev, Alexander Nesterov, Andrey Ivanov, Ilya Novikov, Alexey Simakin, Rafael Usmanov, Denis Solomovich
2014	Long-distance trip from Norway to South Africa in a Volkswagen Touareg. Distance: around 18,000 km (11,000 mi).	Rainer Zietlow, Marius Biela, Matthias Prillwitz
2015	Cape to Cape world record drive from the southernmost point of South Africa, Cap Agulhas, to the northernmost point of Europe, Nordkapp, in a Volkswagen Touareg. The vehicle and the team were flown from Jordan to Turkey. Distance: around 17,500 km (10,900 mi) in 9 days and 4 hours.	Rainer Zietlow, Marius Biela, Sam Roach
2016	World record drive from the easternmost place in Eurasia that can be reached by highway, Magadan, Russia, to the westernmost point in Eurasia, Cabo da Roca, Portugal, in a Volkswagen Touareg. Distance: around 15,100 km (9,400 mi) in 6 days and 9 hours.	Rainer Zietlow, Marius Biela, Petr Bakanov
2017	World record drive along the ancient Silk Road from Shanghai, China, to Venice, Italy, via Kyrgyzstan, Turkmenistan and Iran in a Volkswagen Tiguan. Distance: around 12,600 km (7,800 mi) in 5 days and 18 hours.	Rainer Zietlow, Petr Bakanov, Dmitriy Makarov
2018	Long-distance drive from Bratislava, Slovakia, to the Volkswagen Touareg world premiere in Beijing, China, in a Volkswagen Touareg Prototype. Distance: around 16,500 km (10,300 mi).	Rainer Zietlow, Rodion Baranov, Alexandre Pogodin
2018	Long-distance drive from Beijing, China, back to Wolfsburg, Germany, with two Volkswagen Touaregs and accompanying journalists. Distance: around 16,500 km (10,300 mi).	Rainer Zietlow, Rodion Baranov
2019	Second world record drive on the Pan-American Highway from Deadhorse, Alaska, to Ushuaia, Argentina, with a Volkswagen Amarok. Vehicle and team were flown over the Darien jungle from Panama City to Medellín, Colombia. Distance: around 22,100 km (13,700 mi) in 10 days and 19 hours.	Rainer Zietlow, Marius Biela, Nelson Scarabela
2020	World record for the longest distance driven within one country (Germany) in an all-electric vehicle, the Volkswagen ID.3. Distance: about 28,000 km (17,000 mi) in 65 days with stops at 830 Volkswagen dealers and 650 charging stations over 60 kW.	Rainer Zietlow, Dominic Brüner
2021	Guinness World Record for the longest distance driven within a country (USA) by an all-electric vehicle, the Volkswagen ID.4. Distance around 58,000 km (36,000 mi) in 97 days with stops at 628 American Volkswagen dealers.	Rainer Zietlow, Derek Collins
2022	Guinness World Record for the greatest height above sea level with an all-electric vehicle, the Volkswagen ID.4. An altitude of 5,816 m (19,081 ft) was reached at the Uturuncu volcano, Bolivia.	Rainer Zietlow, Cristian Órdenes, Pedro Abarca, Alvaro Rojas
2023	First drive with an all-electric vehicle, a Volkswagen ID.4, and no support vehicle in the spring through Alaska from Homer to Deadhorse. Subsequent drive from Deadhorse to Key West, Florida.	Rainer Zietlow, Derek Collins
2023	Guinness World Record for the fewest charge stops to cross Canada in a battery-powered electric car (St. John's - Victoria) in a Volkswagen ID.4 GTX: 18 stops (7,133 km in 7 days).	Rainer Zietlow, Elric Popp
2023	First all-electric journey from Geneva, Switzerland to Doha, Qatar with ferry crossing from Lavrio, Greece to Amman, Jordan in two Volkswagen ID.BUZZ, around 6,800 km.	Rainer Zietlow, Frank M. Rinderknecht, Anouk Köpfer, Camillo Pohl
2024	Guinness Word Record for the largest GPS drawing by an electric battery powered car, set in Australia by replicating the logo of Volkswagen Australia's 70th anniversary. To achieve this, 33,548 kilometers were covered in a Volkswagen ID.4 GTX within 43 days. The actual record is the distance for the drawing: 23,849 km	Rainer Zietlow, Marius Biela
2024	Guinness Word Record for fastest time to cross all ten Australian deserts in a petrol-and-diesel-powered production pick-up truck. In 6 days, 10 hours and 15 minutes, 6,241 kilometres were covered in a VW Amarok V6 Diesel.	Rainer Zietlow, Marius Biela, Brad Howes
2026	Guinness World Record for the most countries visited on a single, continuous journey in a battery-powered electric vehicle, the Volkswagen ID.Buzz. A total of 92 countries were visited, covering 99,767 km (61,992 mi) km and involving 300 charging stops.	Rainer Zietlow, Sönke Helmut Dannemann, Marius Biela, Mr. Wang, Tristan Reip, Pedro Elias Abarca Urbano, Christian Altmann, Sardar Mohammed Abdullah
