= Ianchuk =

Ianchuk (Ukrainian: Янчук) is a gender-neutral Ukrainian surname that may refer to

- Dmytro Ianchuk (born 1992), Ukrainian sprint canoeist
- Elizaveta Ianchuk (born 1993), Ukrainian tennis player
- Olga Ianchuk (born 1995), Ukrainian tennis player, sister of Elyzaveta

== See also ==
- Yanchuk
