= Costel Iancu =

Romanian politician

Costel Iancu (known in the press as Dom' Costel, Mr. Costel) is a Romanian politician who has been involved in a scandal in which he was accused of kidnapping local businessmen and taking photographs of them naked and in chains.

== Political career ==
A member of the ruling Democratic Liberal Party (PD-L), Iancu won a term as a member of the Dolj County Council. He was also the PD-L Senate candidate in Calafat, and although he won the most votes, because he had less than 50% of the votes, he lost his place during the redistribution of the votes.

On 25 February 2009, he was named by the government as the Director of the National Administration of Land Improvement, a function that is equivalent with a secretary of state in the Ministry of Agriculture. Following the kidnappings scandal which reached the press, he resigned.

== Kidnappings ==
Andrei Alexandru (from Vâlcea County, residing in Austria) claims he was kidnapped in 2006, together with his wife. On the ring road of Craiova, he was caught between a Volkswagen Touareg and several other cars. Alexandru claimed that around 10-15 people got out of the cars, including Iancu, who began to hit him with the fists in the head, then took him in the Volkswagen, while holding a gun to his neck.

According to Andrei Alexandru, he was held overnight and released only after he said he will make Iancu an associate at his company.

In the testimony against Iancu, another victim, Constantin Niţu claimed that Iancu kicked him, after which he undressed, chained him and urinated on him, kept him in the rain and cold for several days, during which he took a number of photographs. Niţu claimed Iancu said he did the same with a number of other people and he knows how to keep people quiet, showing his gun and claiming he'd shoot both Niţu and his father.

Another victim, Adrian Radu (from Mehedinți) said that together with five men, Iancu took him to a hangar where they took his mobile phone and some of the associates of Iancu, Robert Ştefăniţă Bîltac ann Geromin Victor Bîltac began hitting him with the fists in the face and threatening they'll kill him with a pistol.

Organized Crime department of the police discovered photographs with one of the victims, naked and in chains while wearing a sign saying "I am a rag. Don't do like me, I made a mistake with Mr. Costel". According to the prosecutors, Iancu kept the photos for intimidating other people who opposed him.

== Trial ==
On October 27, 2006, the prosecutors accused him of organized crime, kidnapping, threats and violence. Although the prosecutors asked to be taken in custody by the police, the Dolj Courthouse denied this.

The case was brought to trial in March 2009, Iancu being accused together with his accomplices:

- Marian Sandu, formerly known as Cristescu, a.k.a. Fibră - an associate of Ion Clămparu
- Laurenţiu Gheorghe Capotescu a.k.a. Pătatu’
- Lucian, Geromin Victor and Robert Ştefăniţă Bîltac

In the first trial, at the Dolj Courthouse, he was found not guilty, the judge Stan Prodănescu retiring short time after this. The same decision was found at the Court of Appeals and, on 15 November 2011, the High Court of Cassation and Justice ended the trial with a final and irrevocable verdict of "not guilty".

Two of the three judges at the High Court of Cassation and Justice retired during the trial in order to avoid the case and one of those judges being replaced with a controversial judge, Sofica Dumitraşcu, the judge known for releasing convicted terrorist Omar Hayssam.
