= Volkswagen Touareg =

Mid-size luxury crossover SUV

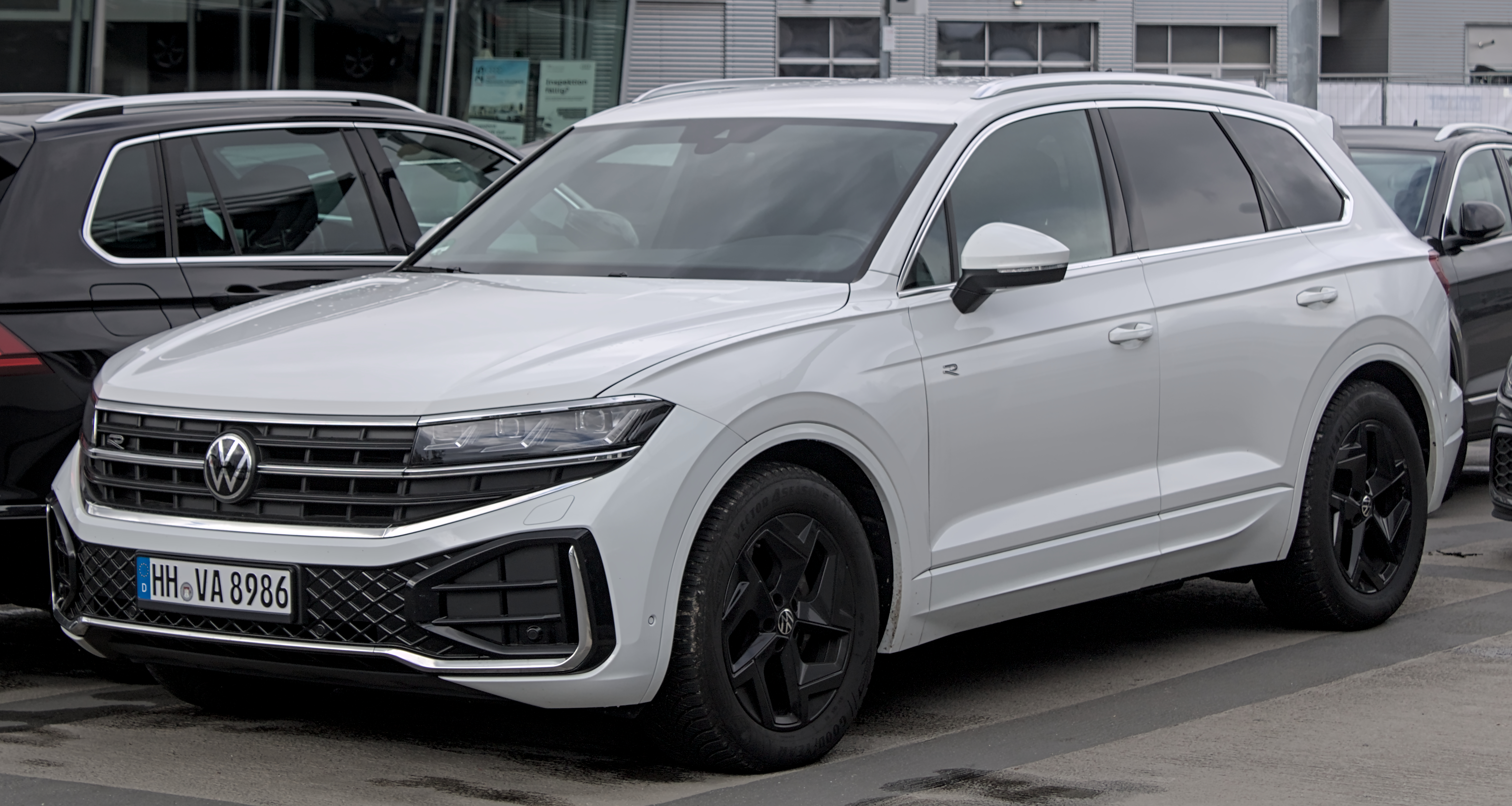

Overview
- Manufacturer: Volkswagen
- Production: August 2002 – March 2026

Body and chassis
- Class: E-segment luxury crossover SUV
- Body style: 5-door SUV
- Layout: Front-engine, four-wheel-drive (4motion)

The Volkswagen Touareg (German pronunciation: [ˈtuːaʁɛk]) is a mid-size luxury crossover SUV produced by Volkswagen from August 2002 until March 2026. The vehicle takes its name from the nomadic Tuareg people, inhabitants of the Saharan interior in North Africa. It served as Volkswagen's flagship SUV throughout its production life and was built exclusively at the Volkswagen Bratislava Plant in Slovakia, with CKD assembly in Malaysia commencing in 2024.

The Touareg was originally developed jointly with the Porsche Cayenne and Audi Q7, all three sharing the Volkswagen Group PL71 platform for the first generation (2002–2010). The first generation was notable for its breadth of engine options, spanning five, six, eight, ten, and twelve cylinders. The second generation (2010–2018) shared the updated PL72 platform with the same corporate siblings and introduced a full-hybrid variant. The third generation (2018–2026) moved to the MLB Evo architecture shared with the Porsche Cayenne, Audi Q7, Audi Q8, Bentley Bentayga, and Lamborghini Urus, and added a plug-in hybrid drivetrain. A facelift of the third generation was introduced for the 2024 model year, and production of all variants ended in March 2026.

Volkswagen discontinued the Touareg for sale in North America from the 2019 model year, citing lower demand relative to the larger and more affordable Volkswagen Atlas, which had been introduced for 2017. Over its production lifetime of three generations the Touareg accumulated significant motorsport achievements, including a victory in the 2005 DARPA Grand Challenge with the autonomous vehicle Stanley and multiple Dakar Rally stage wins.

== Development ==
The Volkswagen Touareg (internally designated Typ 7L) was developed as a joint venture project between Porsche and the Volkswagen Group, involving both the Audi and Volkswagen marques. A development team located in Weissach, Germany, led by Klaus-Gerhard Wolpert, created the Volkswagen Group PL71 platform that underpins all three first-generation vehicles — the Touareg, the Audi Q7, and the Porsche Cayenne. The Touareg and Cayenne both seat five passengers, while the Q7's stretched wheelbase accommodates a third row for seven. During the initial development phase, Porsche operated as an independent company outside the Volkswagen Group; Porsche AG did not become a wholly owned Volkswagen subsidiary until 2012.

Porsche's chief executive at the time, Wendelin Wiedeking, sought to diversify the brand's product portfolio beyond sports cars, leading to the Cayenne as Porsche's first four-door model. Production of the Touareg and Q7 was concentrated at the Volkswagen Bratislava Plant in Bratislava, Slovakia, while Porsche established a dedicated Cayenne assembly line at its Leipzig plant.

== First generation (7L; 2002) ==
First generation (7L)
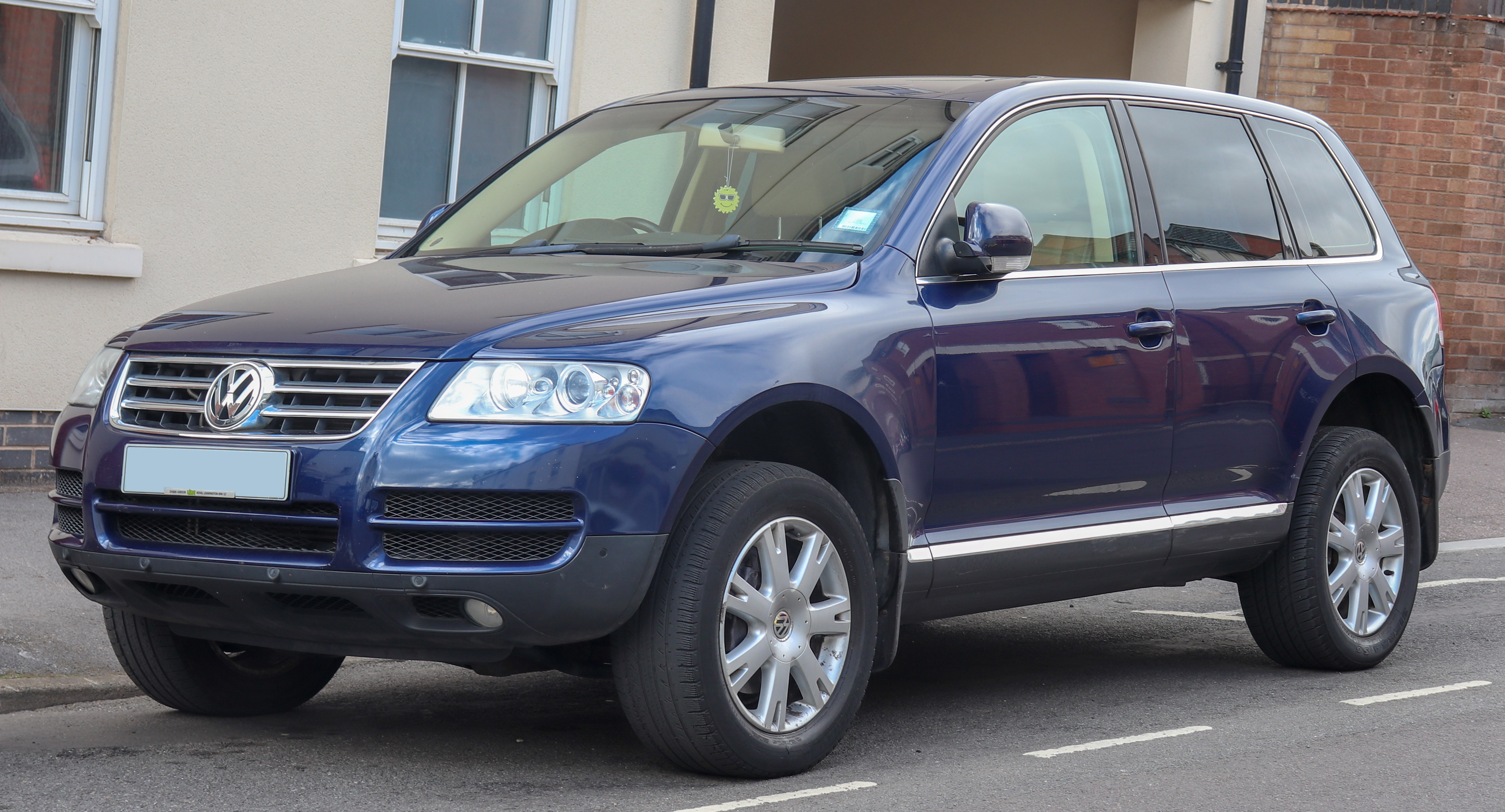

Overview
- Production: 2002–2010
- Assembly: Slovakia: Bratislava (Volkswagen Bratislava Plant)
- Designer: Erwin Leo Himmel

Body and chassis
- Platform: Volkswagen Group PL71 platform
- Related: Porsche Cayenne; Audi Q7

Powertrain
- Engine: Petrol: 3.2 L VR6 FSI; 3.6 L VR6 FSI; 4.2 L V8; 4.2 L V8 FSI; 6.0 L W12 FSI; Diesel: 2.5 L R5 TDI; 3.0 L V6 TDI; 5.0 L V10 TDI
- Transmission: 6-speed manual; 6-speed Aisin/VW TR-60SN/09D automatic

Dimensions
- Wheelbase: 2,855 mm (112.4 in)
- Length: 4,754 mm (187.2 in)
- Width: 1,928 mm (75.9 in)
- Height: 1,726 mm (68.0 in)

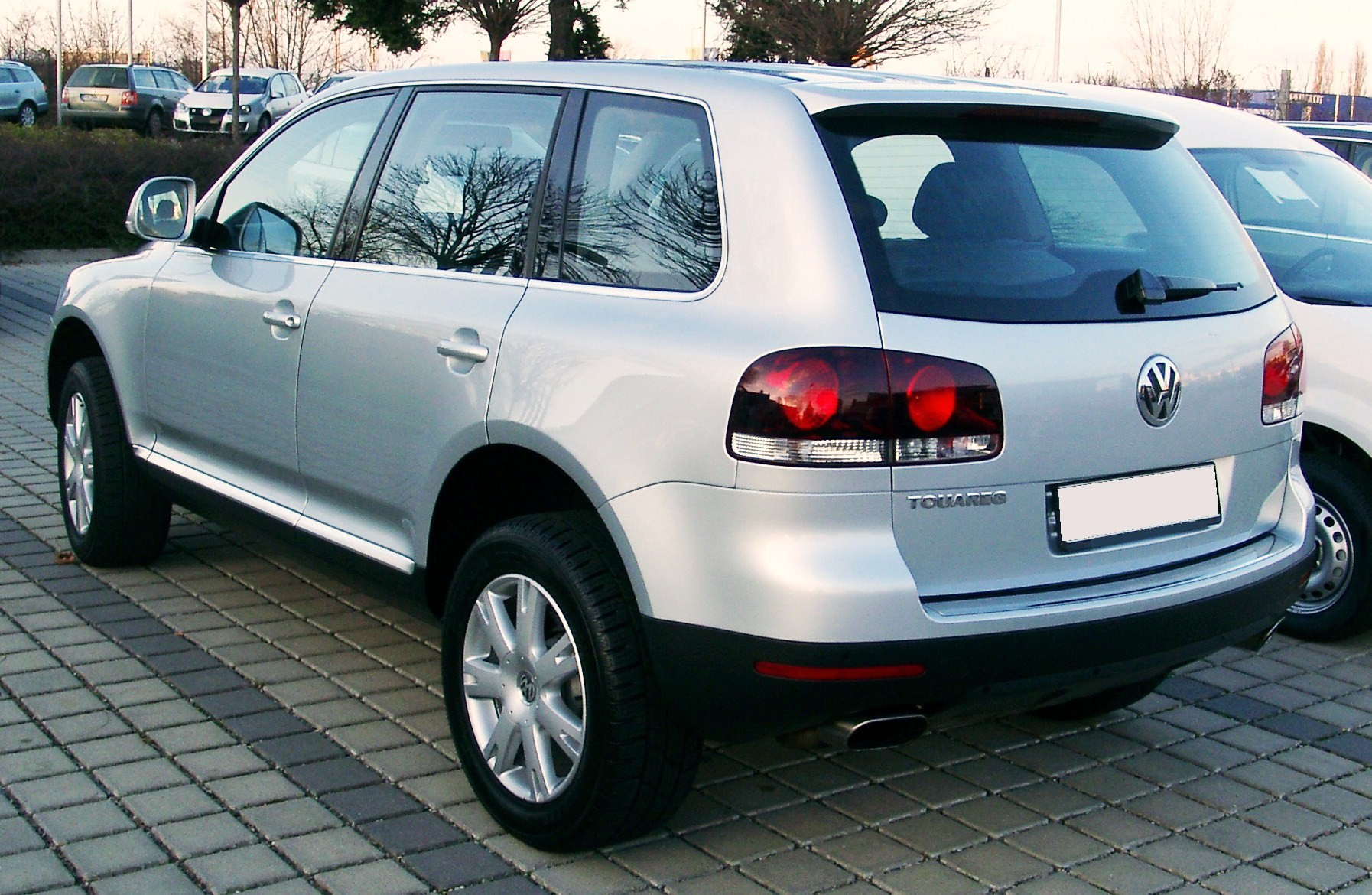
Rear view, first-generation Volkswagen Touareg

The first-generation Touareg was introduced in 2002. It came standard with a 4XMotion four-wheel drive system featuring an automatic progressively locking centre differential with manual override and an in-cabin-activated low-range setting. An optional four-wheel active air suspension could raise the ride height on demand, and an optional locking rear differential enhanced off-road capability. An uncommon option was a front-locking differential. Ground clearance at load level is 160 mm (6.3 in), rising to 244 mm (9.6 in) in the Off-Road setting and 300 mm (11.8 in) at maximum height. It won multiple awards including Best Luxury SUV, Best Sport/Utility, Best 4x4, and Least Green Car of 2004 in the United States.

=== W12 (2005–2010) ===
The 6.0-litre DOHC 48-valve W12 engine variant was initially intended as a limited-edition model, with only 500 units planned; around 330 were allocated for Saudi Arabia, with the remainder for Europe. Some W12 Touaregs were sold in China, and no sales were made in the United States. Eventually the W12 became an unrestricted production variant. According to Volkswagen, it accelerates from 0 to 100 km/h (62 mph) in 5.9 seconds and reaches an electronically limited top speed of 250 km/h (155 mph).

=== V10 TDI (2002–2008) ===
The V10 TDI was offered in the United States for a limited period in 2004, but emissions regulations temporarily removed it from sale.

The V10 TDI returned to the US market as a 2006 model in five states, and later US models met all 50-state emission standards using ultra-low-sulphur diesel and particulate filters. Stricter California Air Resources Board (CARB) standards ultimately reduced 2008 compliance to 43 of 50 states, before the V10 TDI was cancelled in the United States. It was replaced by a V6 TDI meeting CARB minimum requirements for the 2009 model year.

=== Facelift (2006–2010) ===
The first facelift was unveiled at the 2006 Paris Motor Show, with its North American debut at the 2007 New York Auto Show as a 2008 model. The update introduced the shield grille styling shared with other Volkswagen models, along with more than 2,300 redesigned parts and several new technologies: ABS Plus, which works with the traction control system to shorten braking distance by up to 25% on loose surfaces; Front Scan, an adaptive cruise control system capable of slowing or stopping the vehicle according to traffic; and Side Scan, a blind-spot monitor using rear-mounted radar to flash warning LEDs in the door mirrors if the driver signals while another vehicle is detected alongside.

The 2007 Touareg could also be optioned with a driving dynamics package, a rollover sensor, a 620-watt Dynaudio sound system, and redesigned comfort seats. All diesel variants received a standard diesel particulate filter.

In the United States and Canada, the facelifted Touareg was marketed as the Touareg 2 for the 2008–2010 model years, reverting to simply Touareg in 2011.

==== R50 (2007–2010) ====
Volkswagen Touareg R50

The Touareg R50 was the third Volkswagen, after the Golf and Passat, to receive the R performance treatment by Volkswagen Individual GmbH. It was globally launched at the 2007 Australian International Motor Show and named for its 5.0-litre displacement. The R50 used a 5.0-litre V10 diesel engine producing 257 kW (349 PS; 345 hp) and 850 N⋅m (627 lb⋅ft) of torque, accelerating from 0 to 100 km/h (62 mph) in 6.7 seconds. It came standard with 21-inch Omanyt wheels, sport-tuned air suspension, engine-spin finish interior trim, and an optional four-zone Climatronic climate control system.

==== V6 TDI Clean Diesel (2009–2016) ====
The V6 TDI Clean Diesel featuring a selective catalytic reduction (SCR) system replaced the V10 TDI in the United States and Canada. A 17 L (4.5 US gal) tank mounted beneath the boot floor stores the AdBlue solution, which Volkswagen recommended checking and refilling every 8,000 km (4,971 mi).

The Touareg BlueTDI was unveiled at the 2007 Geneva Motor Show and the production version at the 2008 LA Auto Show.

==== Touareg "Lux Limited" (2009) ====
The Touareg "Lux Limited" was a variant for the US market based on the V6 TDI Clean Diesel, V6 FSI, and V8 FSI. It featured 20-inch "Mountain" alloy wheels with 275 all-season tyres, a choice of four body colours, a full aerodynamics kit, dual-power front seats, Cricket two-tone leather interior, touchscreen navigation with Bluetooth, a 320-watt 11-speaker audio system, and adaptive HID headlamps. It was unveiled at the 2009 North American International Auto Show.

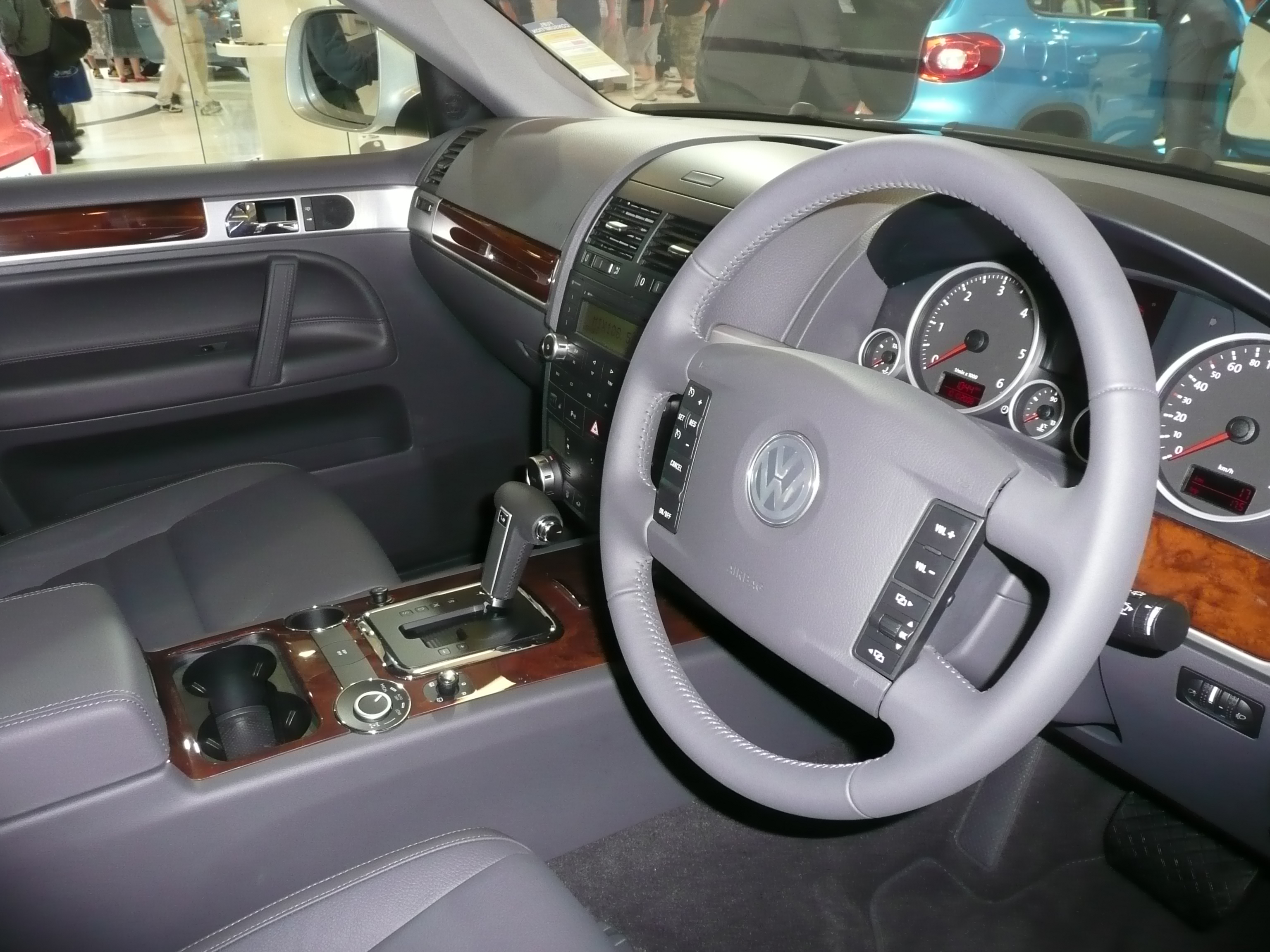
Interior

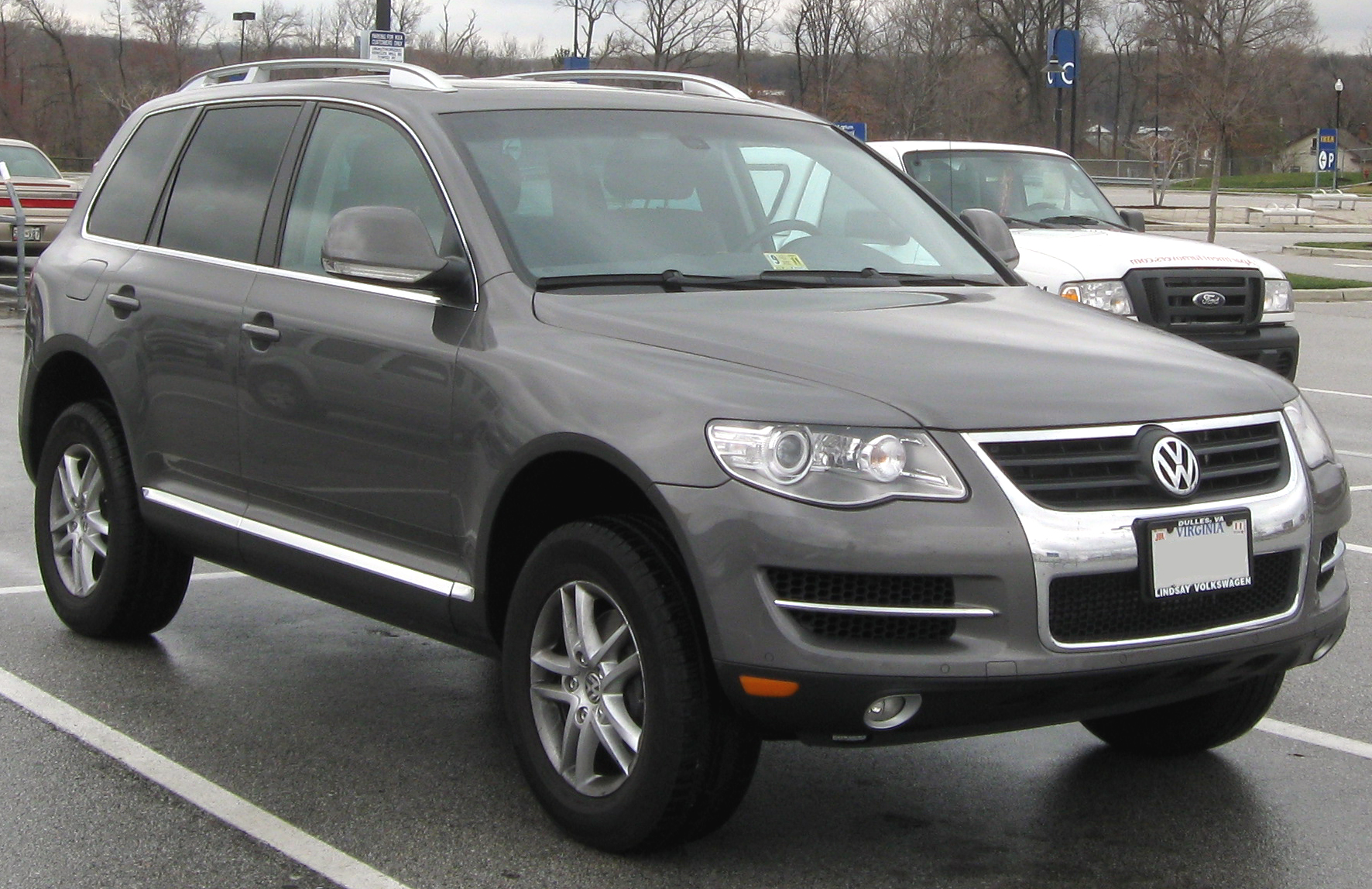
Facelifted Volkswagen Touareg (United States)

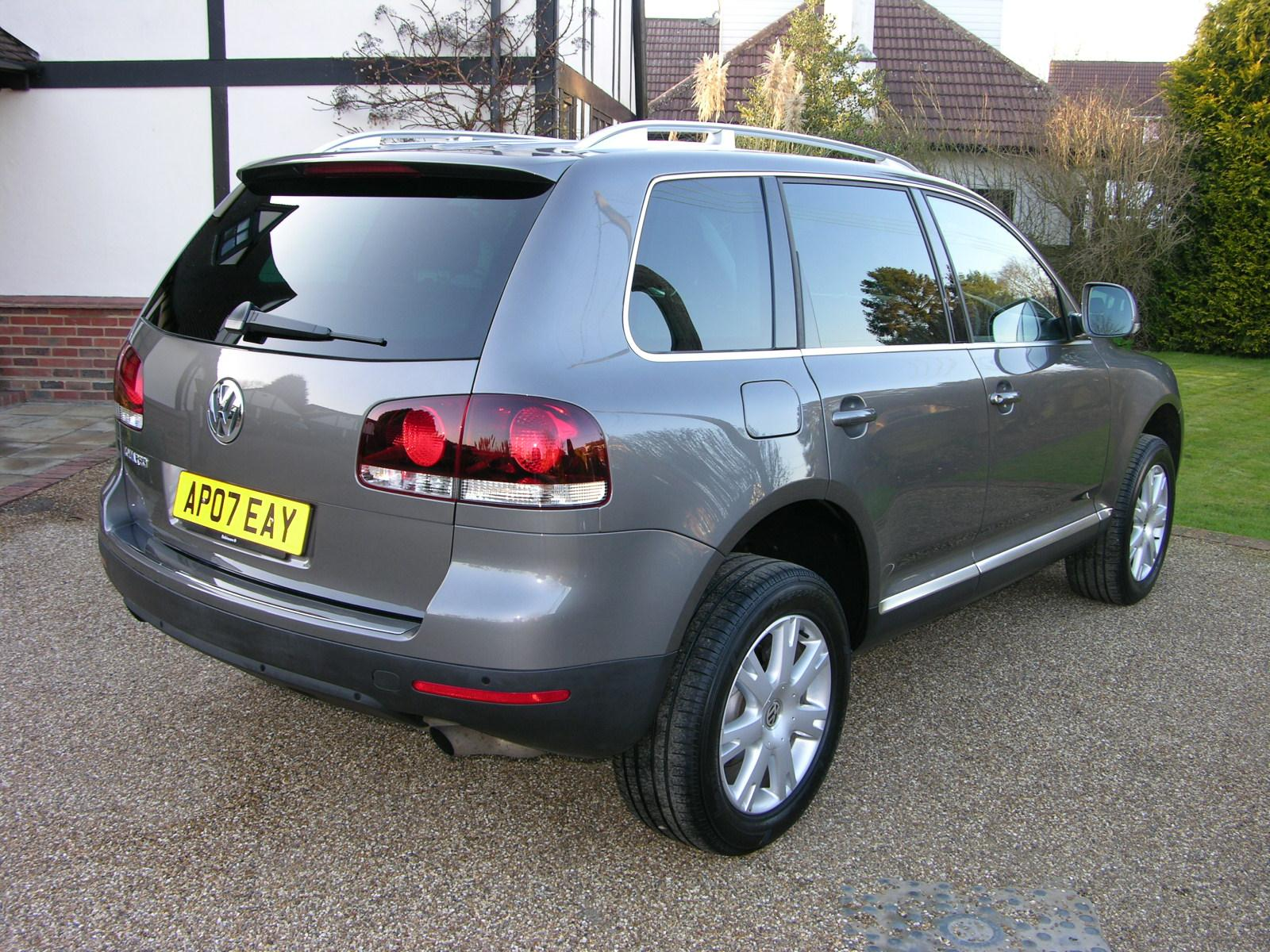
Facelifted Volkswagen Touareg (United Kingdom)

=== Engines ===
| Model | Years | Engine type | Power | Torque | Engine code |
Petrol engines
| 3.2 VR6 | 2002–2007 | 3,189 cc (3.2 L; 194.6 cu in) VR6 | 220 PS (162 kW; 217 hp) at 6,000 | 310 N⋅m (229 lb⋅ft) at 2,500 | AZZ/BAA/BKJ/BRJ/BMV/BMX |
| 3.6 VR6 | 2007–2010 | 3,597 cc (3.6 L; 219.5 cu in) VR6 | 280 PS (206 kW; 276 hp) at 6,250 | 360 N⋅m (266 lb⋅ft) at 2,500–5,000 | BHL/BHK |
| 4.2 V8 | 2002–2007 | 4,163 cc (4.2 L; 254.0 cu in) 40v V8 | 310 PS (228 kW; 306 hp) at 6,000 | 410 N⋅m (302 lb⋅ft) at 3,500 | AXQ |
| 4.2 V8 FSI | 2006–2010 | 4,163 cc (4.2 L; 254.0 cu in) 32v V8 FSI | 350 PS (257 kW; 345 hp) at 6,800 | 440 N⋅m (325 lb⋅ft) at 3,500 | BAR |
| 4.2 V8 TSI Limited | 2006–2010 | 4,163 cc (4.2 L; 254.0 cu in) 32v V8 FSI | | | |
| 6.0 W12 | 2005–2010 | 5,998 cc (6.0 L; 366.0 cu in) W12 | 450 PS (331 kW; 444 hp) at 6,000 | 600 N⋅m (443 lb⋅ft) at 3,250 | |
Diesel engines
| 2.5 R5 TDI | 2003–2010 | 2,461 cc (2.5 L; 150.2 cu in) I5 Pumpe-Düse turbo | 163 PS (120 kW; 161 hp) at 3,500 / 174 PS (128 kW; 172 hp) at 3,500 | 400 N⋅m (295 lb⋅ft) at 2,250 | BAC/BPE |
| 3.0 V6 TDI | 2004–2010 | 2,967 cc (3.0 L; 181.1 cu in) V6 common rail turbo | 225 PS (165 kW; 222 hp) at 3,500 | 550 N⋅m (406 lb⋅ft) at 2,000–2,250 | BKS |
| 3.0 V6 TDI BlueMotion | 2009–2015 | 2,967 cc (3.0 L; 181.1 cu in) V6 common rail turbo | 225 PS (165 kW; 222 hp) at 3,500 | 550 N⋅m (406 lb⋅ft) at 2,000–2,250 | |
| 5.0 V10 TDI | 2002–2008 | 4,921 cc (4.9 L; 300.3 cu in) V10 Pumpe-Düse turbo | 313 PS (230 kW; 309 hp) at 3,750 | 750 N⋅m (553 lb⋅ft) at 2,000 | AYH/BLE/BKW/BWF |
| R50 | 2007–2010 | 4,921 cc (4.9 L; 300.3 cu in) V10 Pumpe-Düse turbo | 350 PS (257 kW; 345 hp) at 3,500 | 850 N⋅m (627 lb⋅ft) at 2,000 | |

=== Marketing ===
In Canada and the United States, advertisements showed the Touareg performing manoeuvres impossible for standard Volkswagen cars. A 2007 Volkswagen Touareg V10 TDI pulled a Boeing 747 in an advertising campaign, setting a world record for the heaviest load ever towed by a production passenger car.

=== Safety ===
ANCAP test results* Volkswagen Touareg variant(s) as tested (2004)
| Test | Score |
|---|---|
| Overall | 5 /5 stars |
| Frontal offset | 14.47/16 |
| Side impact | 16/16 |
| Pole | 2/2 |
| Seat belt reminders | 2/3 |
| Whiplash protection | Not Assessed |
| Pedestrian protection | Poor |
| Electronic stability control | Standard |

== Second generation (7P; 2010) ==
Second generation (7P)
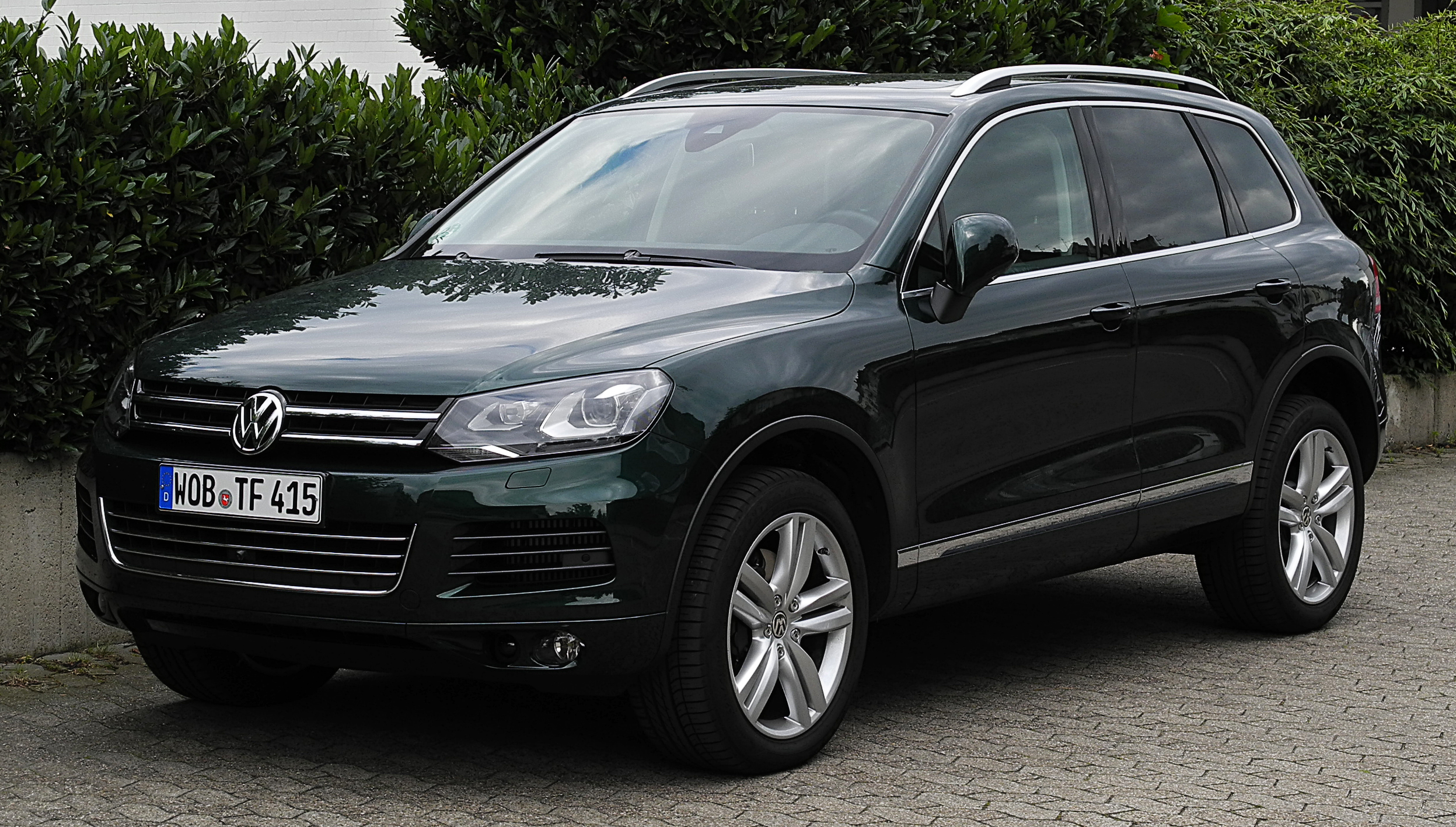

Overview
- Production: 2010–2018
- Assembly: Slovakia: Bratislava (Volkswagen Bratislava Plant)
- Designer: Klaus Bischoff

Body and chassis
- Platform: Volkswagen Group PL72 platform
- Related: Porsche Cayenne; Audi Q7

Powertrain
- Engine: Petrol: 3.0 L V6 TSI (China); 3.6 L VR6 FSI; 4.2 L V8 FSI; Petrol hybrid: 3.0 L V6 TSI; Diesel: 3.0 L V6 TDI; 4.2 L V8 TDI
- Electric motor: 46 PS (34 kW; 45 hp) AC synchronous (hybrid)
- Transmission: 8-speed TL-80SN/TR-82SD automatic

Dimensions
- Wheelbase: 2,893 mm (113.9 in)
- Length: 4,795 mm (188.8 in)
- Width: 1,940 mm (76.4 in)
- Height: 1,709 mm (67.3 in); Hybrid: 1,732 mm (68.2 in)

Chronology
- Successor: Volkswagen Atlas (United States and Canada)

The second-generation (Typ 7P) Touareg was revealed on 10 February 2010 in Munich and later at the 2010 Beijing International Auto Show. It introduced "Dynamic Light Assist", a world-first glare-free high-beam system that continuously adjusts both the range and pattern of the high beam to avoid illuminating vehicles ahead while maintaining maximum surrounding illumination.

Additional technology on the 7P included adaptive cruise control with a Stop & Go function enabling full stops in traffic, a lane departure warning system (Lane Assist), a blind-spot monitor (Side Assist), Front Assist collision avoidance with automatic emergency braking, Area View with four surround cameras, adaptive air suspension with continuous damping control, and a standard eight-speed automatic transmission.

=== Touareg Hybrid (2010–2018) ===
The Touareg Hybrid was unveiled at the 2010 Geneva Motor Show and later at the 2010 New York International Auto Show and 2010 Guangzhou Auto Show. The Chinese model went on sale in early 2011.

=== Touareg Exclusive (2010–2018) ===
The Touareg Exclusive featured two-tone Nappa leather upholstery in "Pepper Beige–Titan Black" or "Dark Burgundy–Titan Black", heated 12-way electric front seats, leather door inserts, a black headliner, stainless steel sill strips with exclusive lettering, and olive silk gloss wood trim. Standard wheels were 19-inch Salamanca alloys, with optional 19-inch Girona or 20-inch Tarragona items.

=== Race Touareg 3 ===
The Race Touareg 3 was built for the 2011 Dakar Rally, replacing the Race Touareg 2. It used a 2.5-litre twin-turbocharged TDI engine rated at 300 PS (221 kW; 296 hp), a 5-speed sequential gearbox with a ZF-Sachs three-plate ceramic clutch, a steel space-frame chassis, and BF Goodrich 235/85 R16 tyres.

=== 2014 facelift ===
For the 2015 model year, the Touareg 7P received standard bi-xenon headlights, an automatic post-collision braking system, upgraded adaptive cruise control, a new 262 PS (193 kW; 258 hp) V6 TDI engine, improved standard steel-spring suspension, and the addition of online services including Google POI search, Google Earth mapping, Street View, and traffic reporting.

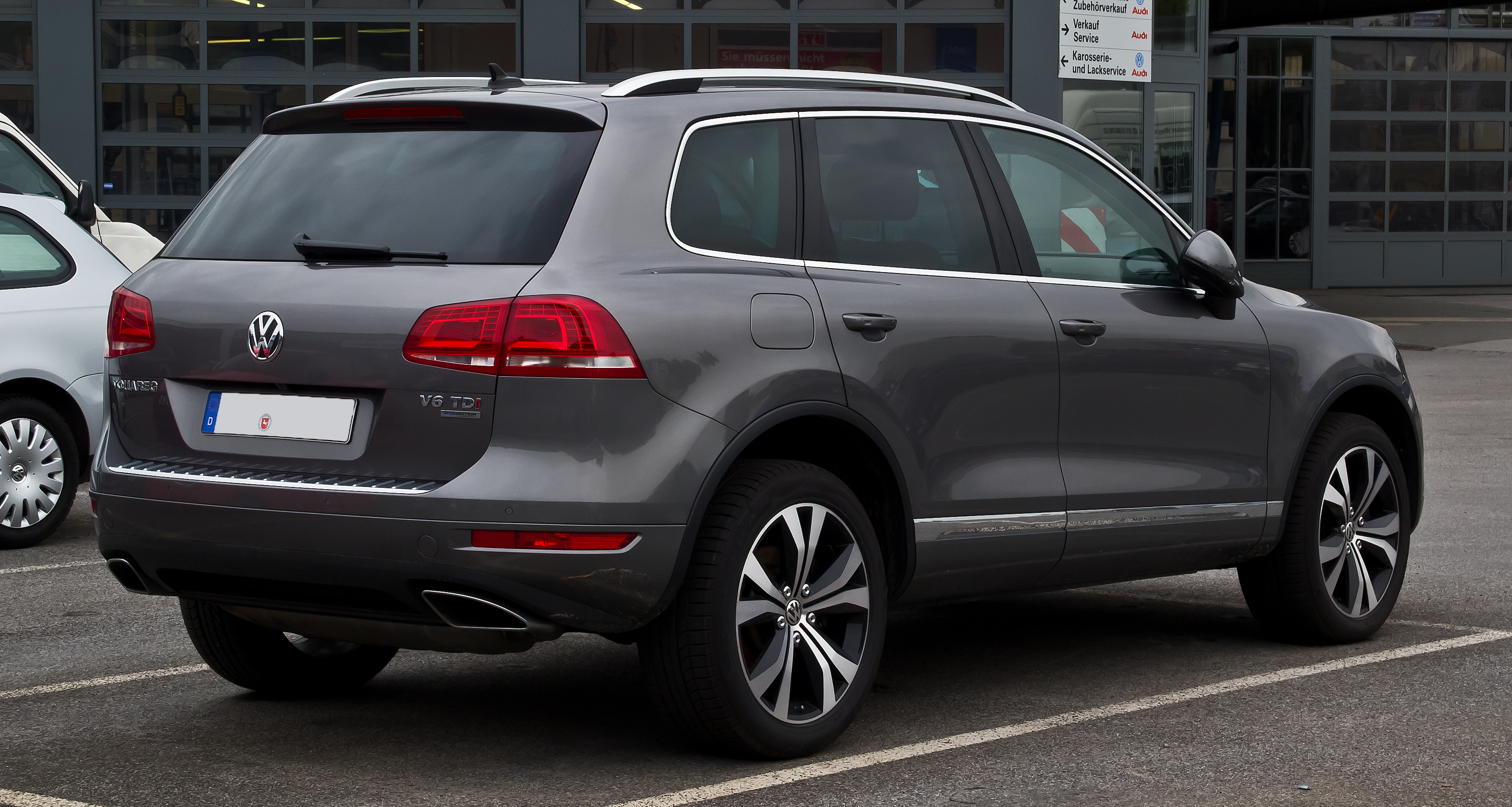
Pre-facelift Volkswagen Touareg V6 TDI BlueMotion (Germany)

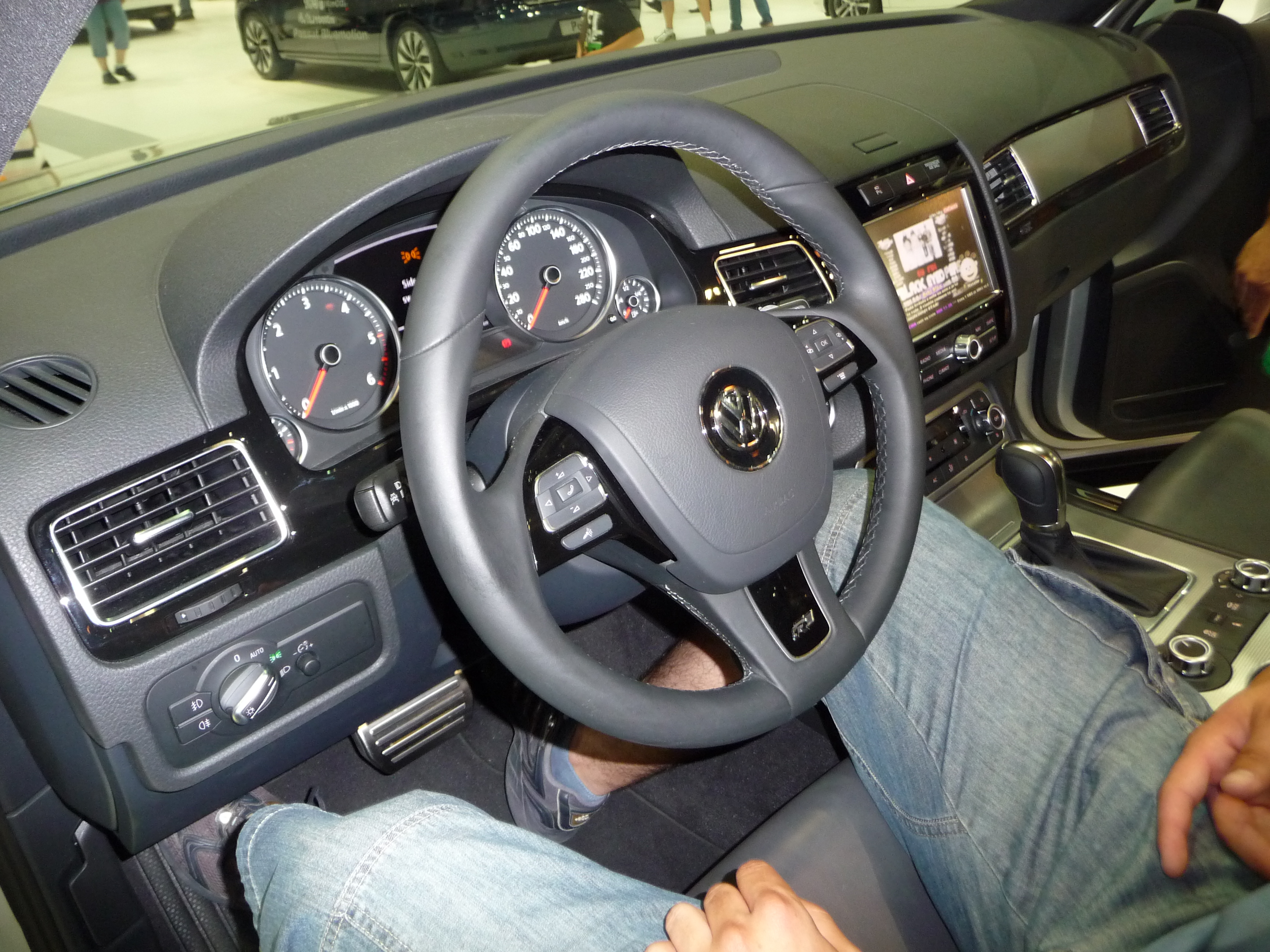
Interior

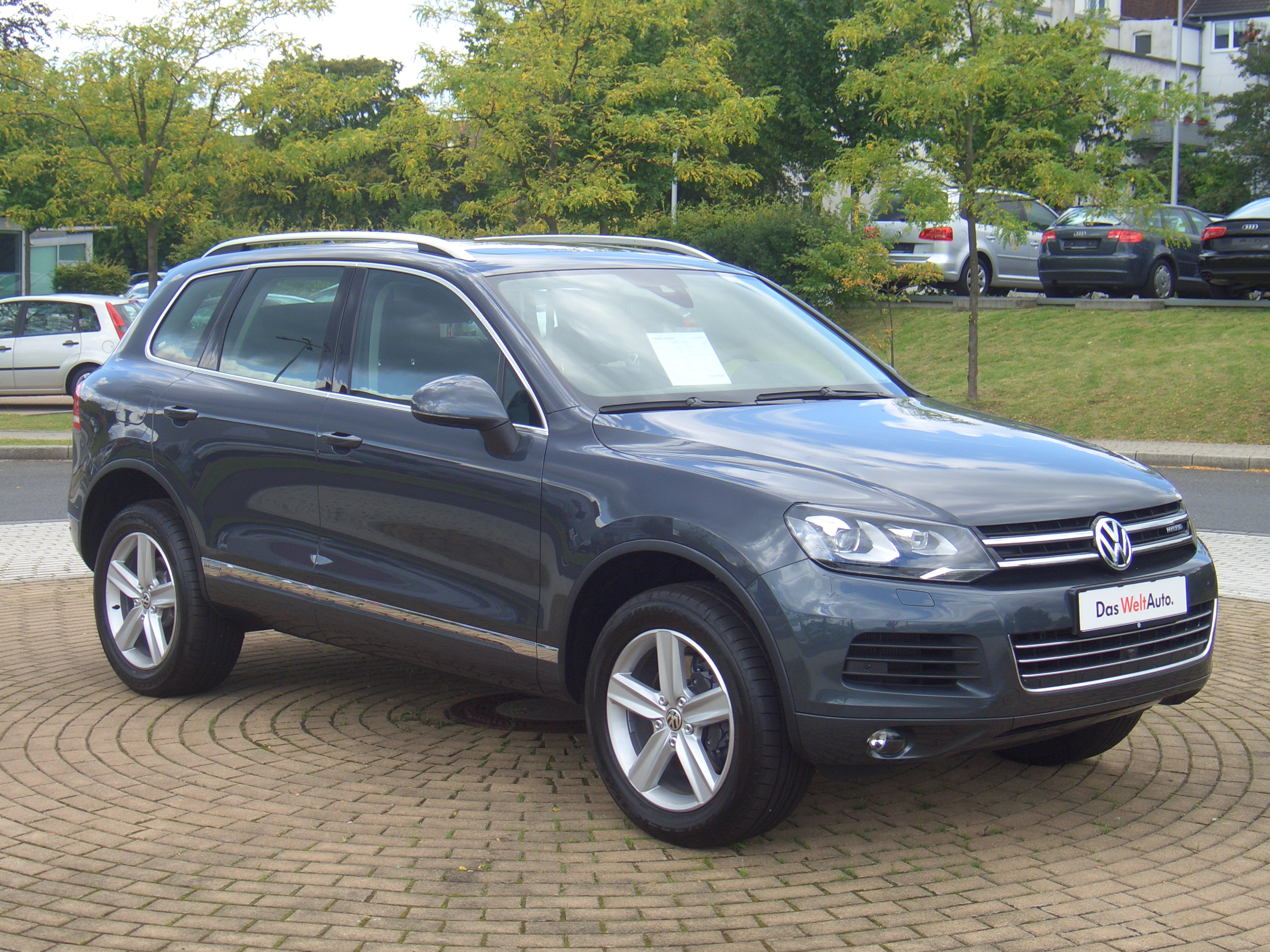
Volkswagen Touareg Hybrid

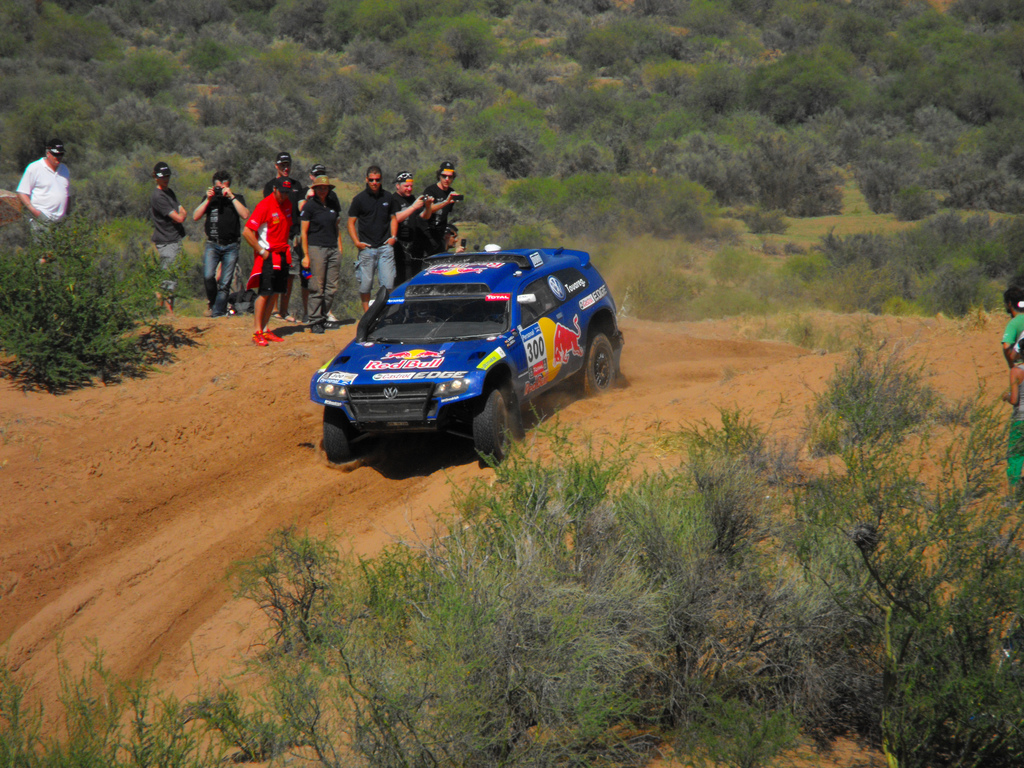
Carlos Sainz Sr. in the Race Touareg 3 at the 2011 Dakar Rally

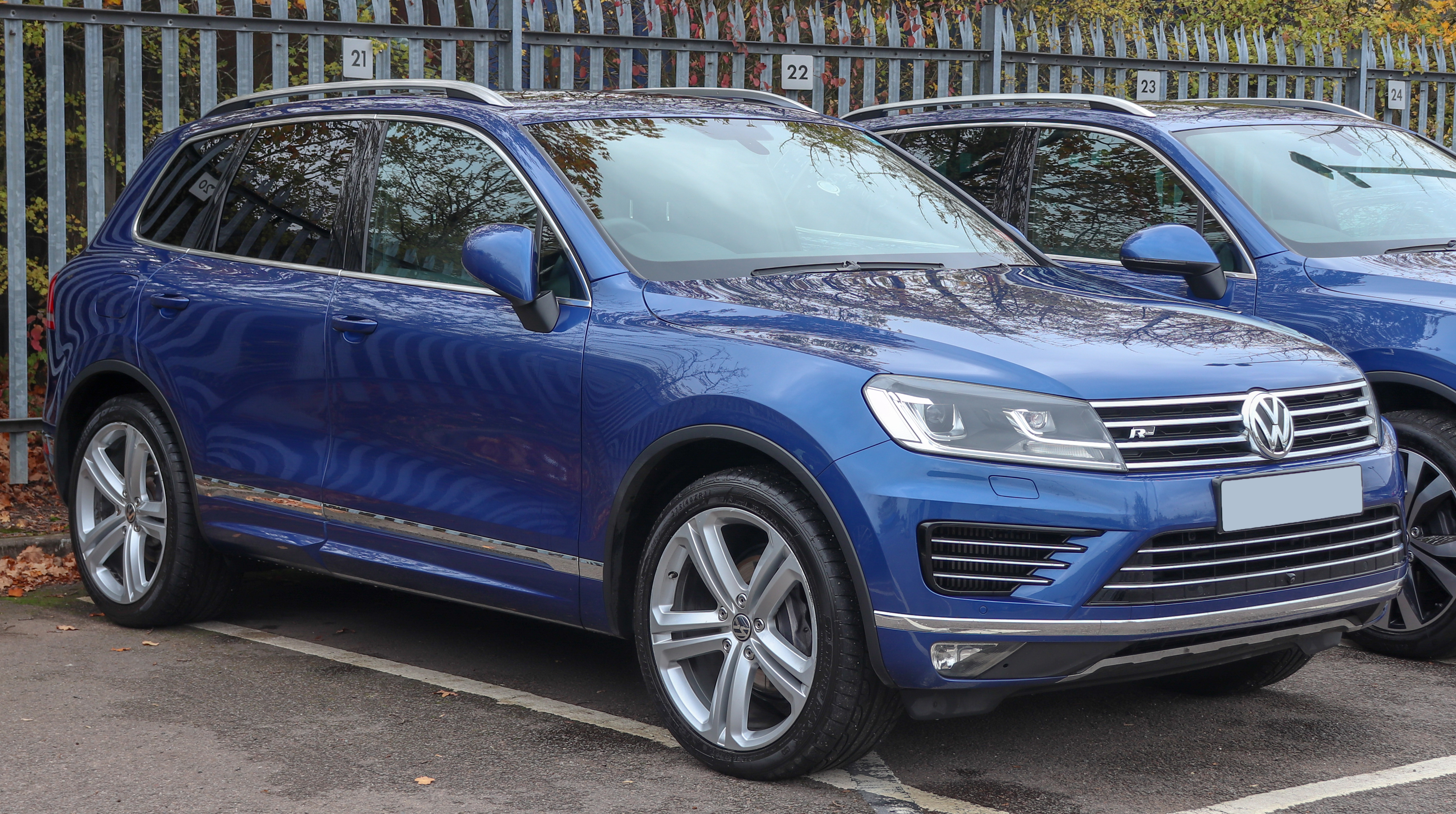
Facelift Volkswagen Touareg

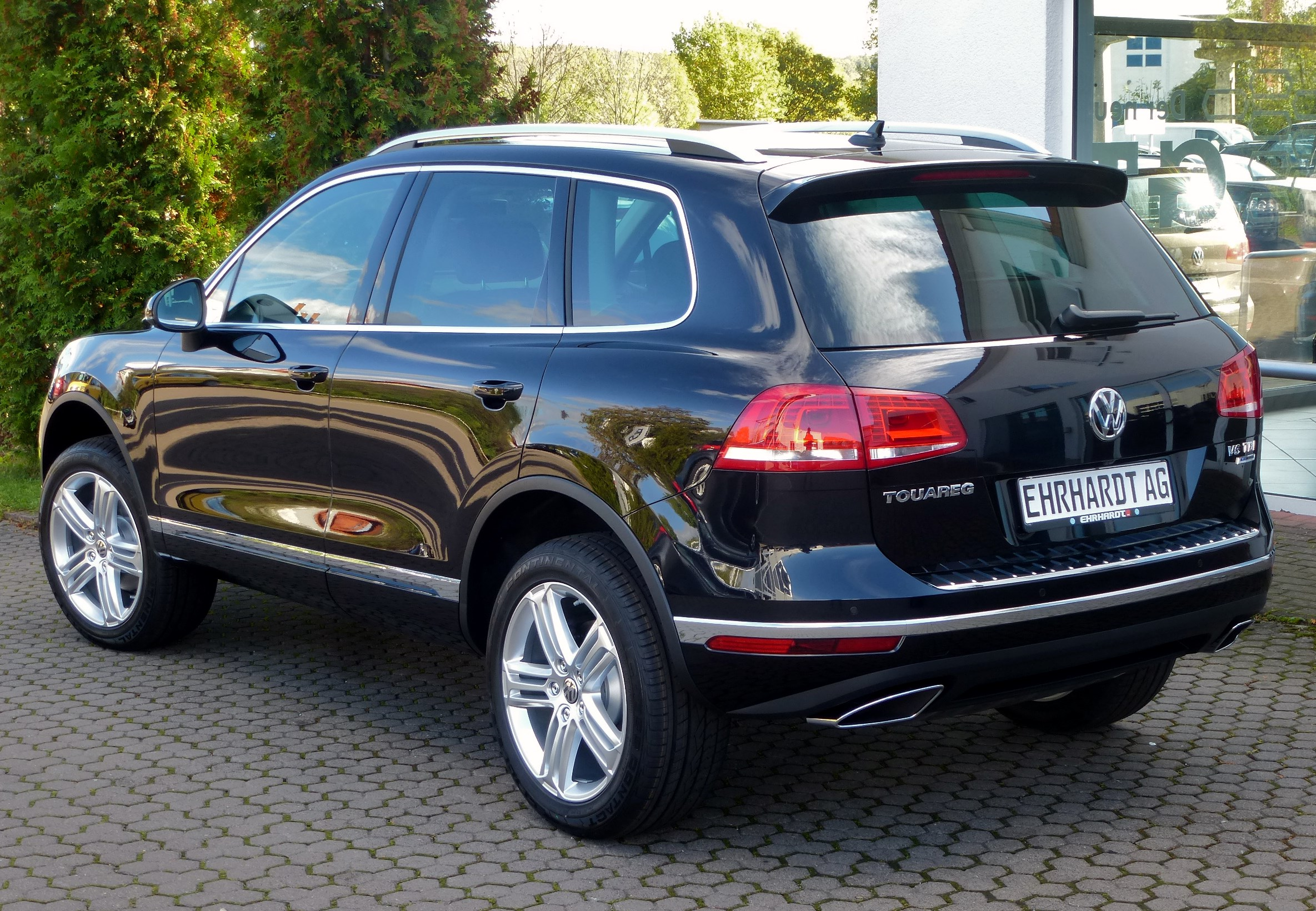
Facelift Volkswagen Touareg

=== Engines ===
Petrol engines
| Model | Years | Engine type | Power at rpm | Torque at rpm | 0–100 km/h (0–62 mph) (s) | Top speed | Regions |
|---|---|---|---|---|---|---|---|
| 3.6 V6 FSI BlueMotion | 2010–2018 | 3,597 cc (3.6 L; 219.5 cu in) VR6 | 280 PS (206 kW; 276 hp) at 6,200 | 360 N⋅m (266 lb⋅ft) at 3,200 | 7.8 | 228 km/h (142 mph) | All except UK, China, New Zealand, Russia; not available in Europe since 2014 |
| 3.6 V6 FSI | 2010–2018 | 3,597 cc (3.6 L; 219.5 cu in) VR6 | 250 PS (184 kW; 247 hp) at 6,200 | 360 N⋅m (266 lb⋅ft) at 3,500 | 8.4 | — | Russia only |
| 3.0 V6 TSI | 2010–2018 | 2,995 cc (3.0 L; 182.8 cu in) V6 supercharged | 290 PS (213 kW; 286 hp) at 4,850–6,500 | 420 N⋅m (310 lb⋅ft) at 2,500–5,000 | 7.1 | 230 km/h (143 mph) | China only |
| 3.0 V6 TSI Hybrid | 2010–2014 | 2,995 cc (3.0 L; 182.8 cu in) V6 supercharged | 333 PS (245 kW; 328 hp) at 5,500–6,500 | 440 N⋅m (325 lb⋅ft) at 3,000–5,250 | 5.8 | 240 km/h (149 mph) | All except Middle East |
| 3.0 V6 TSI Hybrid | 2010–2014 | Electric motor | 46 PS (34 kW; 45 hp) at 1,500–3,250 | — | 5.8 | 240 km/h (149 mph) | All except Middle East |
| 3.0 V6 TSI Hybrid | 2010–2014 | Combined | 380 PS (279 kW; 375 hp) | 580 N⋅m (428 lb⋅ft) | 5.8 | 240 km/h (149 mph) | All except Middle East |
| 4.2 V8 FSI | 2010–2018 | 4,163 cc (4.2 L; 254.0 cu in) V8 | 360 PS (265 kW; 355 hp) at 6,800 | 430 N⋅m (317 lb⋅ft) at 3,500 | 6.2 | 250 km/h (155 mph) | Middle East, Brazil, China, Russia (2010–2014) |

Diesel engines
| Model | Years | Engine type | Power at rpm | Torque at rpm | 0–100 km/h (0–62 mph) (s) | Top speed | Regions |
|---|---|---|---|---|---|---|---|
| V6 TDI BlueMotion (204 PS) | 2010–2018 | 2,967 cc (3.0 L; 181.1 cu in) V6 turbo | 204 PS (150 kW; 201 hp) at 3,200–4,400 | 450 N⋅m (332 lb⋅ft) at 1,250–3,200 | 8.5 | 206 km/h (128 mph) | Germany, Sweden |
| V6 TDI BlueMotion (239 PS) | 2010–2018 | 2,967 cc (3.0 L; 181.1 cu in) V6 turbo | 239 PS (176 kW; 236 hp) at 4,000–4,400 | 550 N⋅m (406 lb⋅ft) at 2,000–2,250 | 7.8 | 218 km/h (135 mph) | Eastern/Western Europe, North America (2010–2015), Australia, China |
| V6 TDI BlueMotion (245 PS) | 2011–2018 | 2,967 cc (3.0 L; 181.1 cu in) V6 turbo | 245 PS (180 kW; 242 hp) at 3,800–4,400 | 550 N⋅m (406 lb⋅ft) at 1,750–2,750 | 7.6 | 220 km/h (137 mph) | Germany, Australia, New Zealand, South Africa |
| V8 TDI | 2010–2018 | 4,134 cc (4.1 L; 252.3 cu in) V8 turbo | 340 PS (250 kW; 335 hp) at 4,400 | 800 N⋅m (590 lb⋅ft) at 1,750–2,750 | 5.8 | 242 km/h (150 mph) | Eastern Europe (2010–2014), Ukraine, Australia, New Zealand, South Africa, Chile |

=== Marketing ===
As part of the Touareg product launch in China, a 3-part, 15-minute movie named A Journey Beyond (锐·享征程) was produced. The movie was produced by DDB Guoan, and directed by Lu Chuan. The film itself was nominated as a finalist in the China Longxi awards under the FILM – Craft: Best editing category.

As part of National Museum of China sponsorship, Touareg Hybrid vehicles were offered as a free shuttle service – named "Museum Hopping" – between the National Museum, the Palace Museum, and the National Art Museum.

=== Safety ===
The Insurance Institute for Highway Safety crash-tested the second-generation Touareg, awarding "Good" ratings across all four assessed categories: moderate overlap frontal, side, roof strength, and head restraints and seats.

| Category | Rating |
|---|---|
| Moderate overlap front | Good |
| Side | Good |
| Roof strength | Good |
| Head restraints and seats | Good |

Euro NCAP test results* VW Touareg (2018)
| Test | Points | % |
|---|---|---|
| Overall: | 5 /5 stars | |
| Adult occupant: | 33.9 | 89% |
| Child occupant: | 42.4 | 86% |
| Pedestrian: | 34.6 | 72% |
| Safety assist: | 10.6 | 81% |

== Third generation (CR; 2018) ==
Third generation (CR)
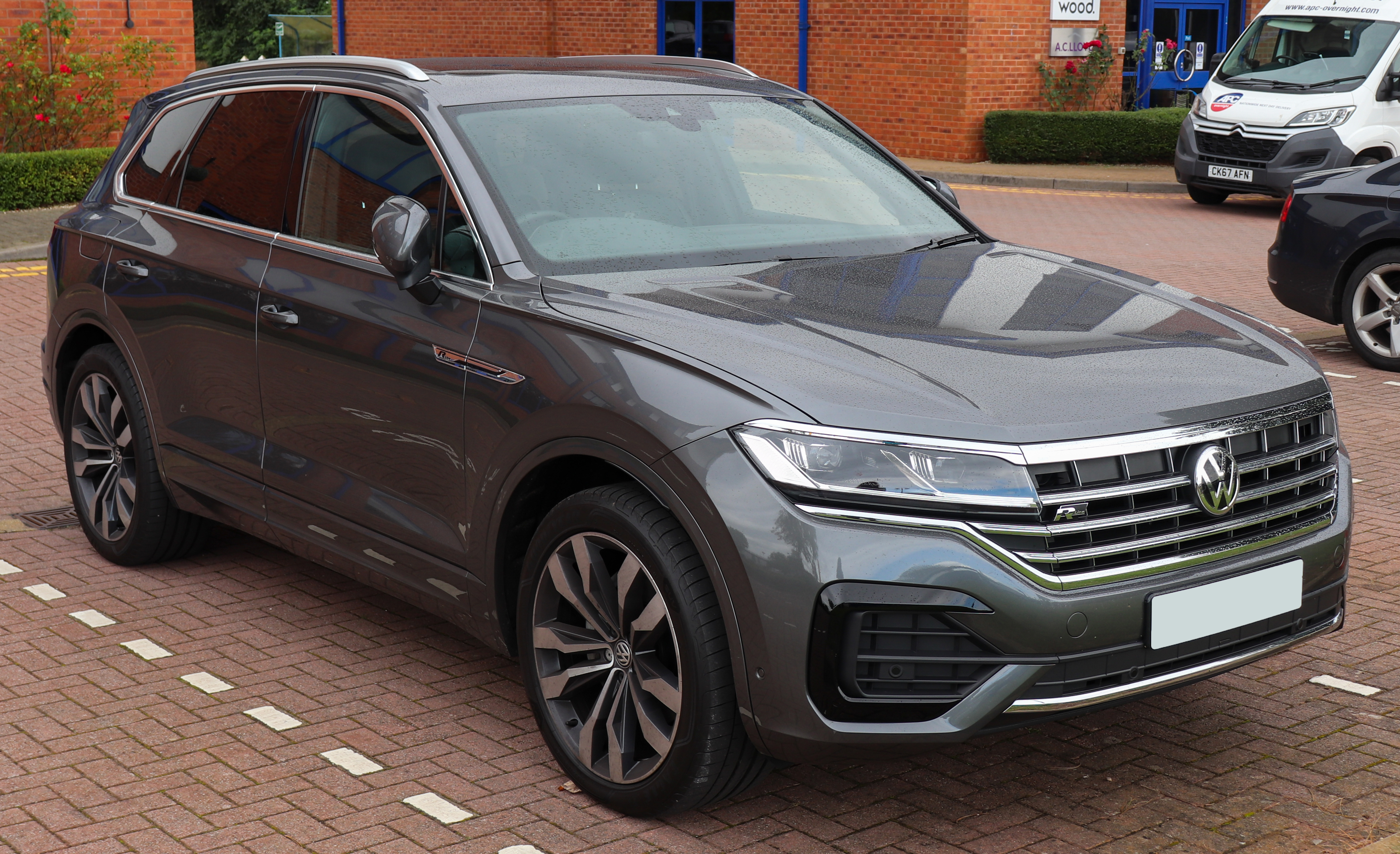

Overview
- Production: 2018–2026
- Assembly: Slovakia: Bratislava (Volkswagen Bratislava Plant); Malaysia: Pekan (HICOM: 2024–2026)
- Designer: Frank Bruese

Body and chassis
- Platform: Volkswagen Group MLB Evo C/D
- Related: Porsche Cayenne (E3); Audi Q7 Mk2; Audi Q8; Bentley Bentayga; Lamborghini Urus

Powertrain
- Engine: Petrol: 2.0 L I4 TFSI; 3.0 L V6 TSI; Petrol plug-in hybrid: 3.0 L DCBE V6 TSI + electric motor; Diesel: 3.0 L V6 TDI; 4.0 L V8 TDI twin-turbo
- Electric motor: 100 kW (136 PS; 134 hp) AC induction motor (PHEV)
- Transmission: 8-speed ZF Tiptronic automatic
- Hybrid drivetrain: PHEV (Touareg R)
- Battery: 17.9 kWh Li-ion

Dimensions
- Wheelbase: 2,894 mm (113.9 in)
- Length: 4,878 mm (192.0 in)
- Width: 1,984 mm (78.1 in)
- Height: 1,717 mm (67.6 in)

The third-generation Touareg was revealed on 23 March 2018 at an event in Beijing and made its motor show debut at the Poznań Motor Show. It is built on the MLB Evo platform shared with the Porsche Cayenne, Audi Q7, Audi Q8, Bentley Bentayga, and Lamborghini Urus, giving the Touareg its first body structure independent of the Audi Q7 door skins. The third generation was not offered in North America, where Volkswagen had already introduced the larger and more affordable Atlas/Teramont from 2017 onward.

The third generation introduced a substantially more advanced driver assistance suite, an optional Innovision Cockpit with a 15-inch touchscreen, and Night Vision with animal and pedestrian detection. A plug-in hybrid variant, the Touareg R, was added in 2020. A mid-cycle facelift for the 2024 model year brought more advanced matrix LED headlights, a new rear light bar, and updated interior displays. Production of all third-generation Touareg variants ended in March 2026.

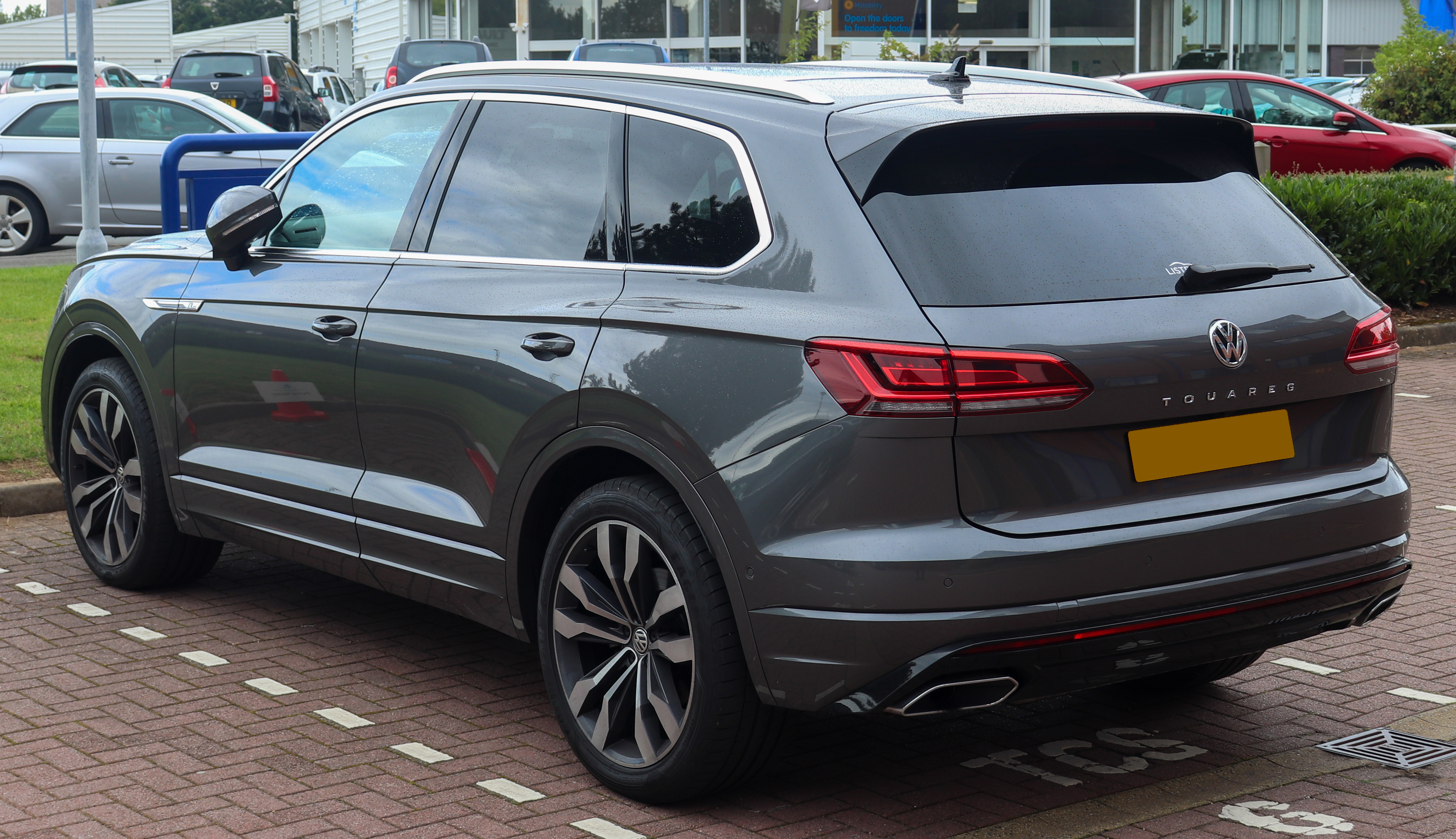
Rear view

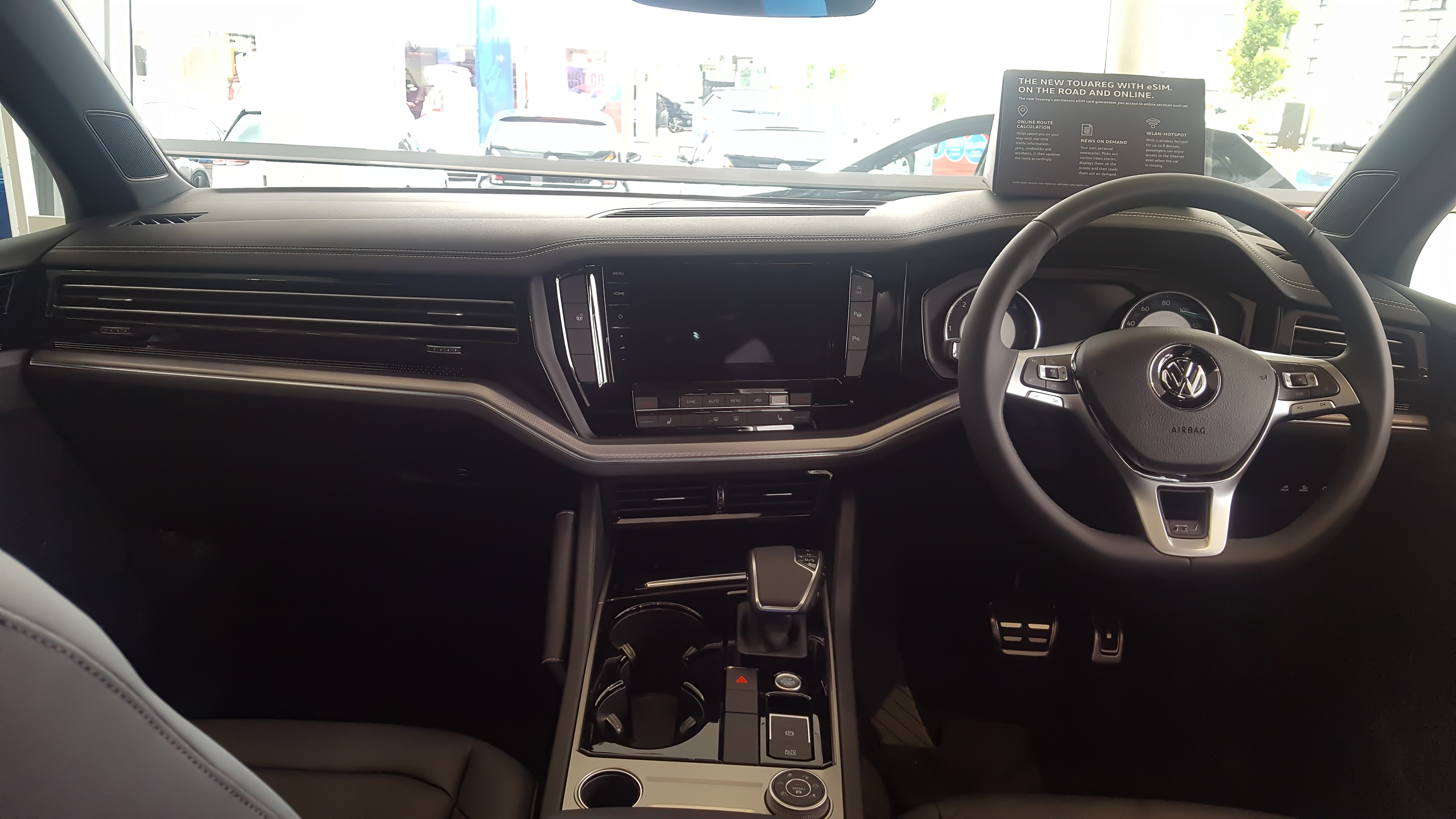
Interior

=== Touareg R PHEV ===
In February 2020, Volkswagen unveiled the Touareg R plug-in hybrid. The powertrain combines a 2,995 cc (3.0 L) V6 turbocharged petrol engine, a 100 kW (136 PS; 134 hp) electric motor, and a 14.1 kWh lithium-ion battery pack. Total system output is 462 PS (340 kW; 456 hp) and 700 N⋅m (516 lb⋅ft) of torque.

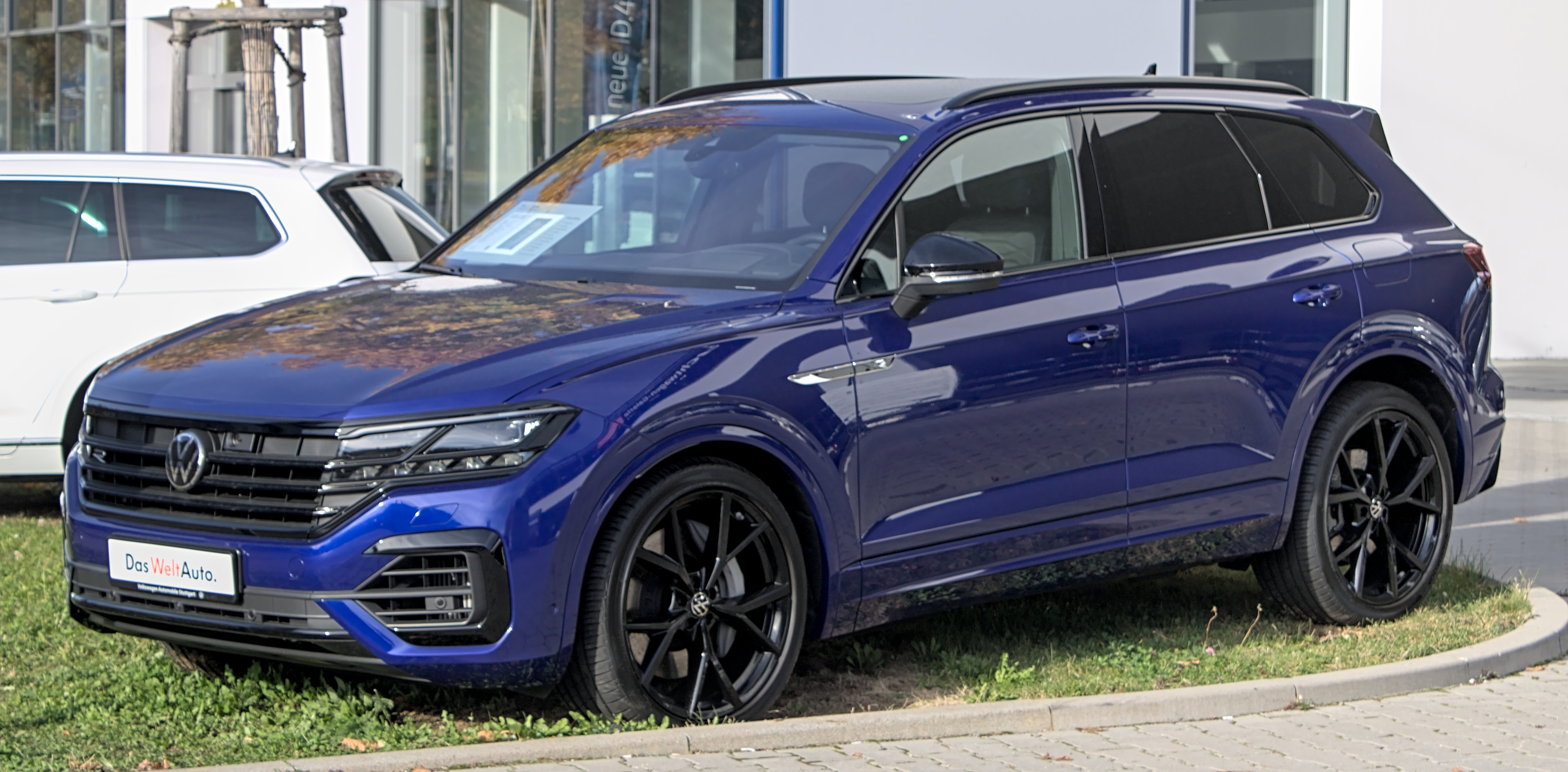
Touareg R

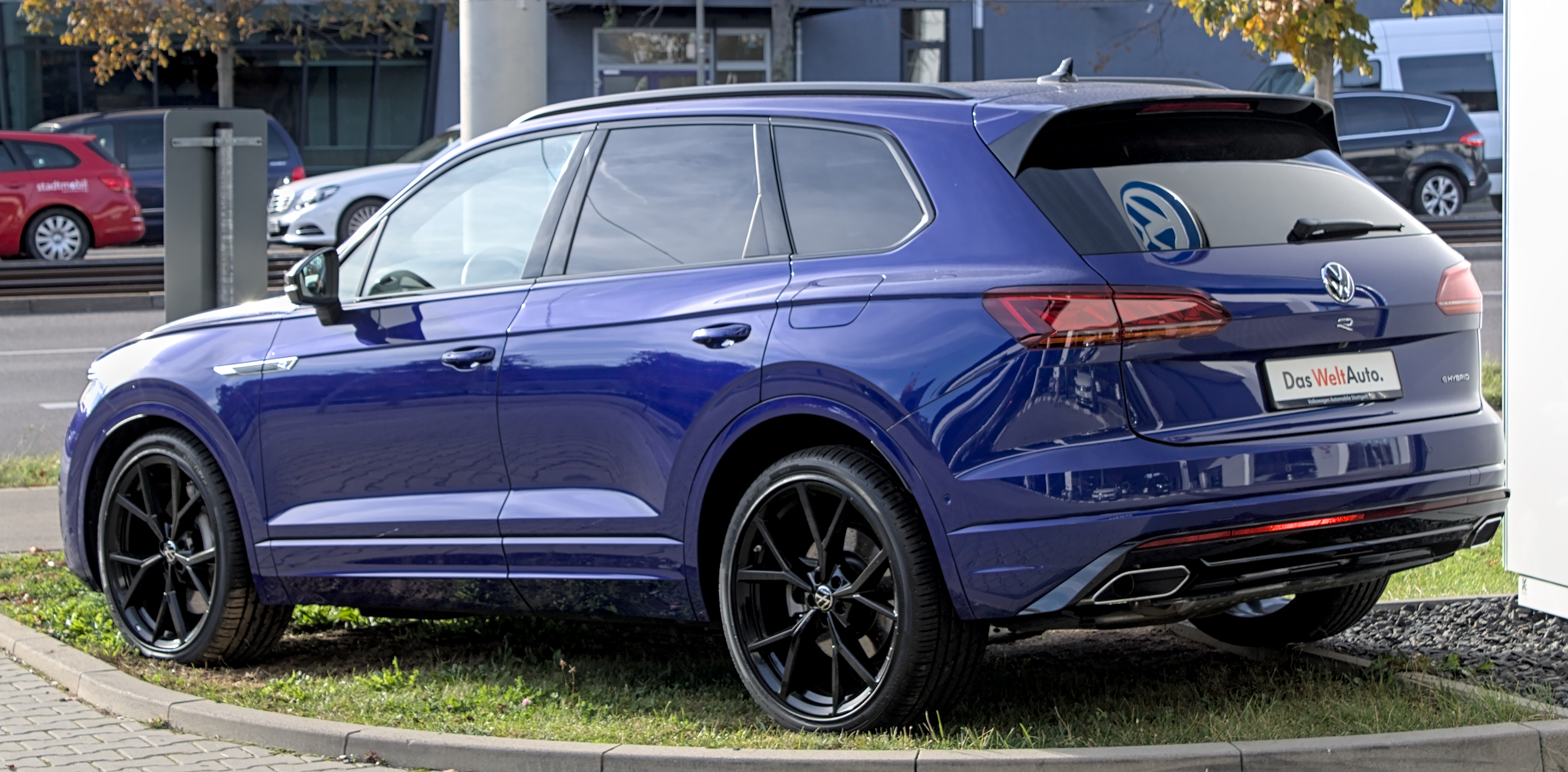
Touareg R rear view

=== Edition 20 ===
In 2022, to mark the Touareg's 20th anniversary, Volkswagen revealed the Edition 20 variant. It featured "Meloe Blue" paintwork with Edition 20 badging on the pillars and a reworked interior with illuminated panels. It was available with four drivelines: the two V6 TDI variants, the V6 TSI, and the plug-in hybrid V6 TSI.

=== 2024 facelift ===
A facelift was unveiled on 23 May 2023, introducing more advanced matrix LED headlights, a new illuminated rear logo and light bar, and revised interior displays.

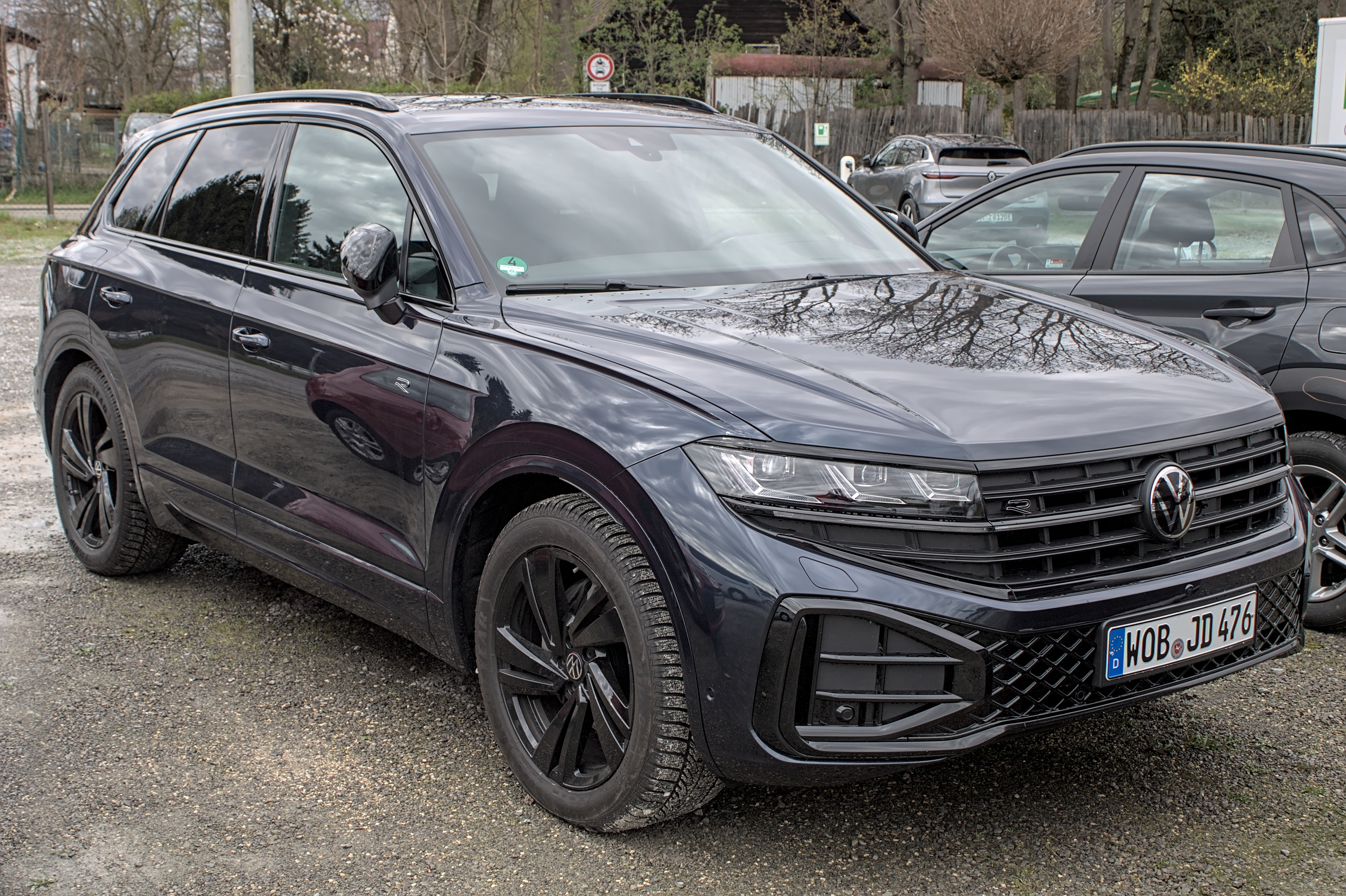
2024 facelift

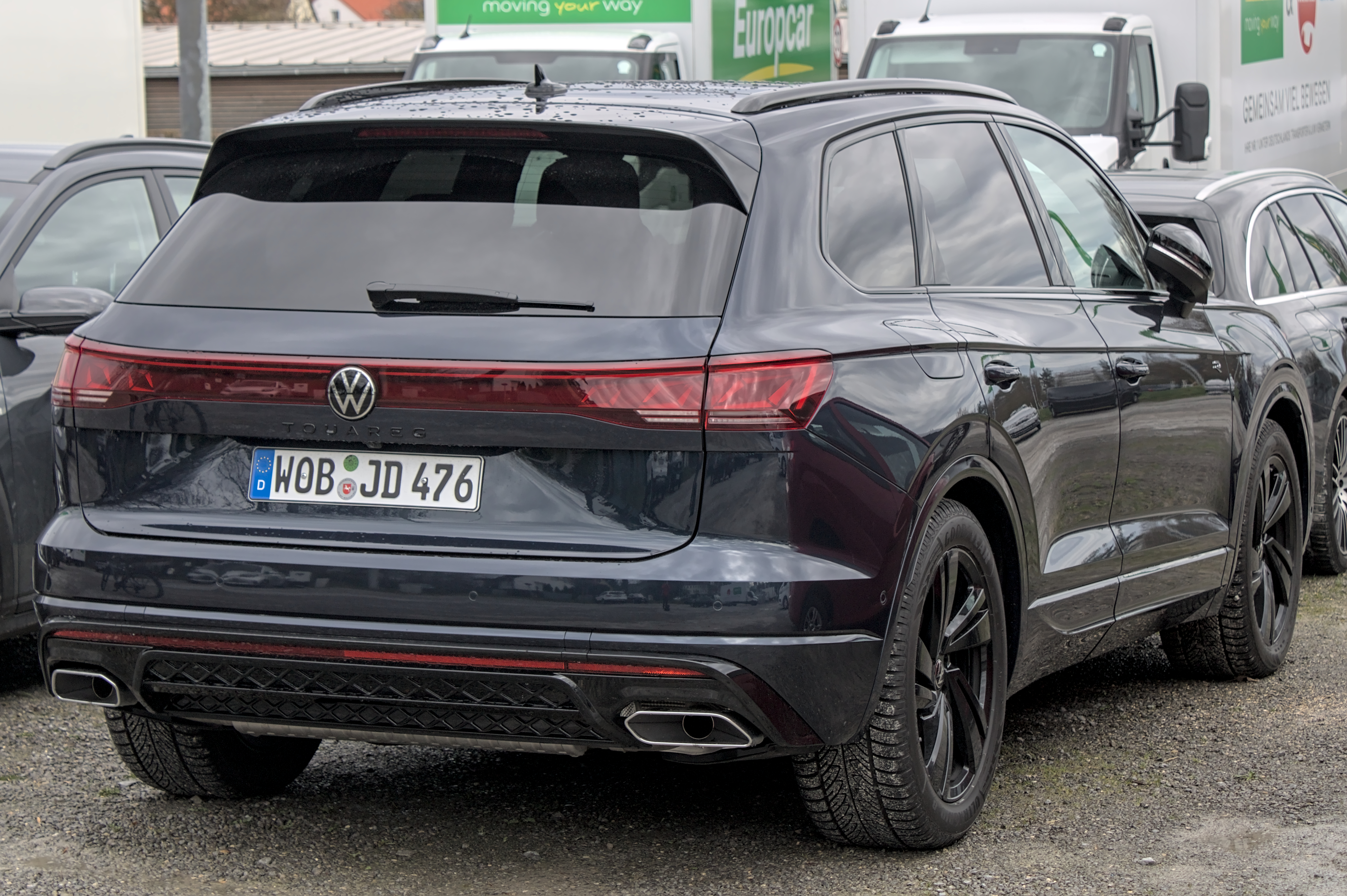
Rear view

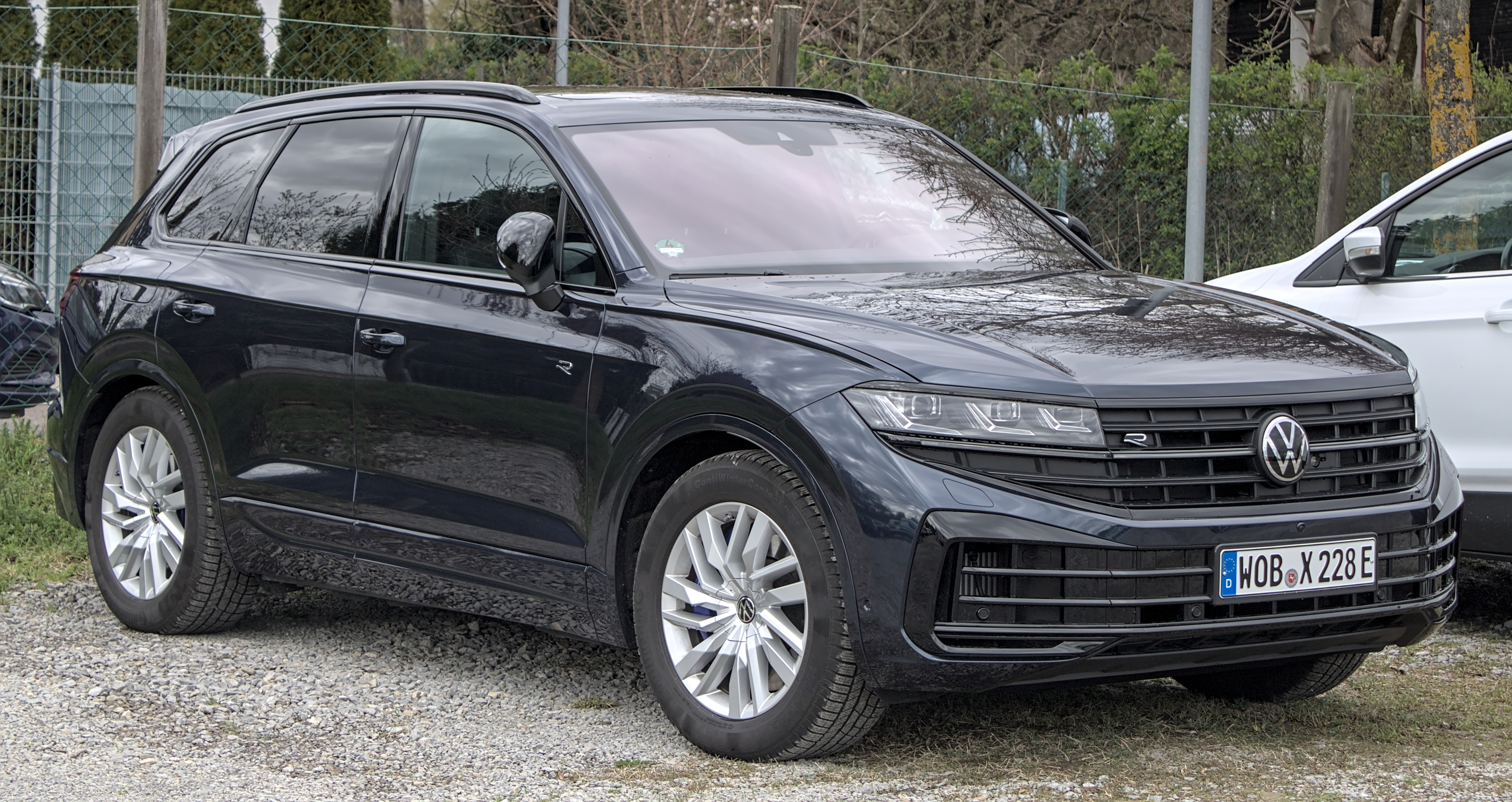
Touareg R (facelift)

=== Safety ===
ANCAP test results* Volkswagen Touareg (2018, aligned with Euro NCAP)
| Test | Points | % |
|---|---|---|
| Overall: | 5 /5 stars | |
| Adult occupant: | 33.9 | 89% |
| Child occupant: | 43.3 | 88% |
| Pedestrian: | 34.6 | 72% |
| Safety assist: | 10.1 | 78% |

== Motorsport ==
A modified Touareg dubbed Stanley won the 2005 DARPA Grand Challenge for autonomous vehicles.

=== Pikes Peak ===
Volkswagen entered V10 TDI Touaregs and a V6 TDI Touareg in the 85th Pikes Peak International Hill Climb. Ryan Arciero won the race with a time of 13:17.703, setting a new division record for the fastest diesel-powered vehicle. Mike Miller finished second at 13:25.247, and Chris Blais third at 15:48.312.

=== Baja 500 ===
A 2.5-litre R5 TDI won a class at the 2007 Baja 500 with drivers Mark Miller and Ralph Pitchford.

=== Baja 1000 ===
A purpose-built Touareg TDI Trophy Truck powered by a 5.5-litre V12 clean diesel with dual Garrett turbochargers, rated at 550 PS (405 kW; 542 hp) and 850 N⋅m (627 lb⋅ft) of torque, was unveiled at the 2008 LA Auto Show. It used a mid-engine, rear-wheel-drive layout with an Xtrac six-speed sequential transmission. The Trophy Truck completed the 41st Tecate SCORE Baja 1000 in 13th place in the Trophy Truck class, driven by Mark Miller.

=== Dakar Rally ===
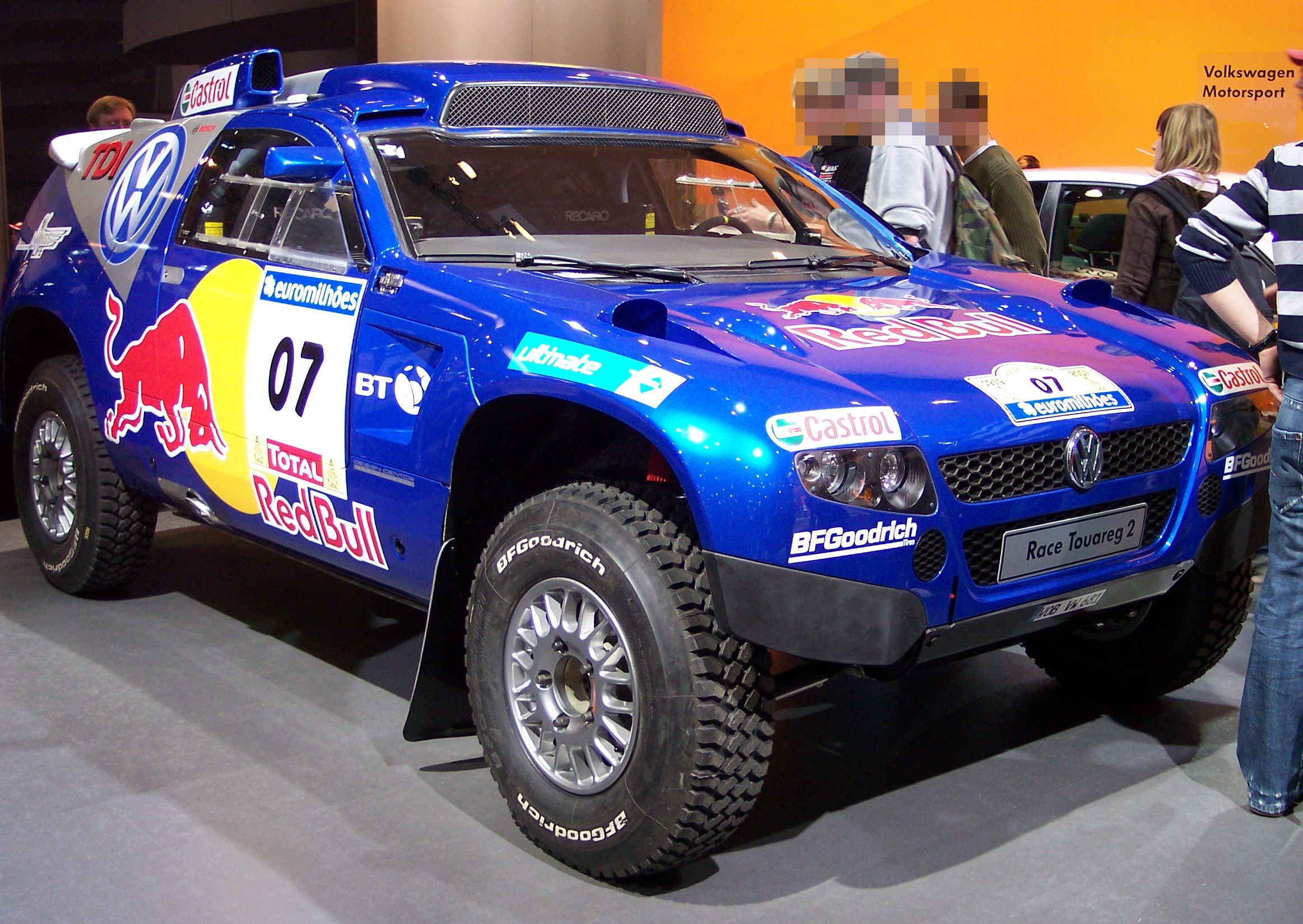
Race Touareg 2 at the 2006 Essen Motor Show.

In the 2003 Dakar Rally, Volkswagen entered rear-wheel-drive Tarek buggies, with Stephane Henrard and Bobby Willis claiming sixth overall. The 2004 Dakar Rally saw the debut of the T2-class Race Touareg, with Bruno Saby and Matthew Stevenson finishing sixth overall. In 2005, Jutta Kleinschmidt and Fabrizia Pons took third overall.

In the 2006 Dakar Rally, Volkswagen driver Giniel de Villiers and co-driver Tina Thörner claimed second place in the new Race Touareg 2, the highest ever finish for a diesel model at the time. In the 2008 Central Europe Rally, Carlos Sainz took victory in the Race Touareg 2. In the 2009 Dakar Rally, Volkswagen achieved a 1–2 result: Giniel de Villiers and Dirk von Zitzewitz won ahead of Mark Miller and Ralph Pitchford. Carlos Sainz crashed out while leading shortly before the finish. Sainz won in 2010 with a 1–2–3 Volkswagen sweep, and Nasser Al-Attiyah won for Volkswagen in 2011.

=== Cape to Cape ===
On 20 September 2015, a Touareg V6 TDI driven by Rainer Zietlow, Marius Biela, and Sam Roach completed 19,000 km (11,806 mi) from Cape Agulhas, Africa's southernmost point, to Nordkapp, Norway in a world record time of 9 days, 4 hours, 9 minutes, and 27 seconds. The record-attempt vehicle used a strengthened suspension, larger tyres, a roll cage, and additional fuel tanks for a total range of 3,000 km (1,864 mi); the engine and drivetrain remained standard.

== Awards ==
The Touareg was Car and Driver magazine's Best Luxury SUV for 2003, Motor Trend magazine's Sport/Utility of the Year for 2004, and Four Wheeler magazine's Four Wheeler of the Year for 2005.

== Sales ==
| Calendar year | Global production | United States | China |
|---|---|---|---|
| 2007 | 72,477 | 8,812 | |
| 2008 | 62,230 | 6,754 | |
| 2009 | 32,308 | 4,392 | |
| 2010 | 48,069 | 4,713 | |
| 2011 | 79,986 | 7,535 | |
| 2012 | 77,635 | 10,553 | |
| 2013 | 70,861 | 8,223 | |
| 2014 | 63,741 | 6,961 | |
| 2015 | 59,190 | 7,037 | |
| 2016 | 47,495 | 4,223 | |
| 2017 | 42,407 | 3,545 | |
| 2018 | 40,387 | 2,022 | |
| 2019 | 52,859 | 160 | |
| 2020 | 41,136 | 3 | |
| 2021 | 34,957 | | |
| 2022 | 31,254 | | |
| 2023 | 34,577 | | 10,851 |
| 2024 | | | 6,581 |
| 2025 | | | 3,450 |
