= Jianchu =

Jianchu (建初) was a Chinese era name used by several emperors of China. It may refer to:

- Jianchu (76–84), era name used by Emperor Zhang of Han
- Jianchu (386–394), era name used by Yao Chang, emperor of Later Qin
- Jianchu (405–417), era name used by Li Gao, ruler of Western Liang
