= Audi Q9 =

Overview
- Manufacturer: Audi AG
- Production: 2026 (to commence)
- Assembly: Slovakia: Bratislava (Volkswagen Bratislava Plant)

Body and chassis
- Class: Full-size luxury crossover SUV (F)
- Body style: 5-door SUV
- Layout: Front-engine, four-wheel-drive (quattro)
- Platform: Premium Platform Combustion (PPC)
- Related: Audi Q7 (G8)

Powertrain
- Engine: Petrol: 2.9 L TFSI V6; 4.0 L TFSI V8; Diesel: 3.0 L TDI V6
- Electric motor: 18 kW (24 PS; 24 hp) MHEV plus technology Electric motor in powertrain generator (PTG)
- Power output: 180–441 kW (245–600 PS; 241–591 hp)
- Transmission: 8-speed Tiptronic automatic
- Hybrid drivetrain: Mild hybrid

Dimensions
- Wheelbase: 3,140 mm (123.6 in)
- Length: 5,310 mm (209.1 in)
- Width: 2,010 mm (79.1 in)
- Height: 1,810 mm (71.3 in)

The Audi Q9 is an upcoming full-size luxury crossover SUV made by the German manufacturer Audi since 2026.

It is Audi's new full-size SUV, positioned above the Q8 as Audi's flagship SUV.

== Overview ==
=== Reveal ===
A prototype of the Q9 was revealed by Audi on 12 May 2026, also revealing its interior. Two months later, it was fully revealed on 29 July 2026.

Q9 rear

Interior

=== Competitors ===
The Q9 is Audi's new full-size SUV and spiritually succeeds the A8 sedan as Audi's flagship vehicle. It is aimed to compete against the BMW X7 and Mercedes-Benz GLS.

=== Equipment ===
Unlike the Q7, the Q9 is mainly offered with three rows, with either a three-seat bench or two individual seats with heating and ventilation. The front seats are heated, ventilated and massaging, with speakers in the headrest. It also has Audi's largest glass roof, which can physically open and also electronically dim. Power doors are available.

Similar to other recent Audi models, the Q9 features Audi's "Digital Stage" display, including an 11.9 inch instrument panel, 14.5 inch central display, and a 10.9 inch passenger display.

=== Specifications ===
==== Platform ====
The Q9 shares its platform with the third-generation Q7, utilizing the Premium Platform Combustion (PPC).

==== Engines ====
The Q9 is offered with a 2.9-liter petrol V6 producing 315 kW (428 PS; 422 hp), a 3.0-litre petrol V6 producing 269 kW (366 PS; 361 hp) in China, or a 3.0-liter turbo-diesel V6 producing 220 kW (299 PS; 295 hp) and 630 N⋅m (465 lb⋅ft) of torque. The SQ9 will be powered by a 4.0-liter V8 producing 441 kW (600 PS; 591 hp) and 800 N⋅m (590 lb⋅ft).
