= Audi Q7 =

E-segment SUV manufactured by Audi

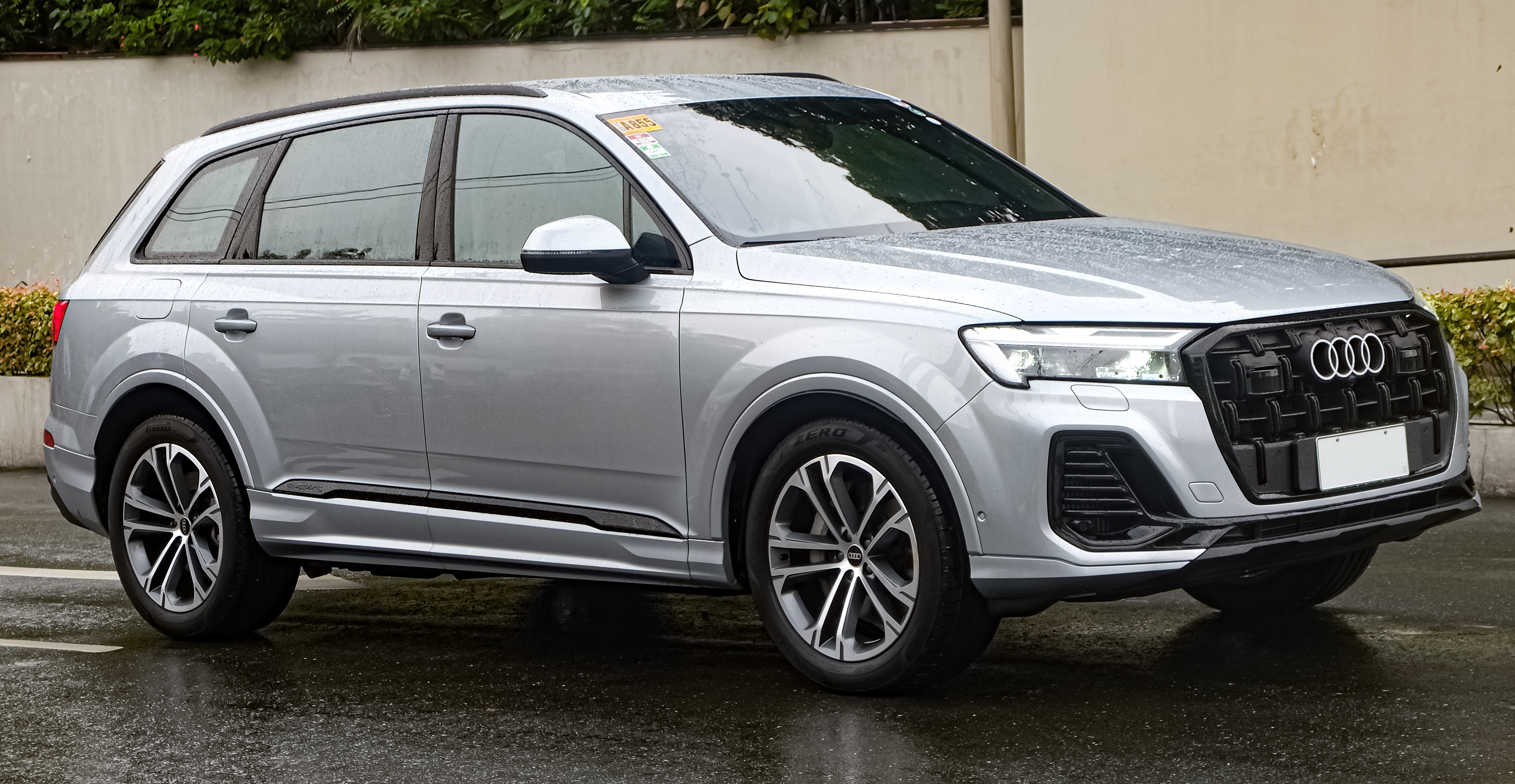

Overview
- Manufacturer: Audi AG
- Production: November 2005–present

Body and chassis
- Class: E-segment SUV
- Body style: 5-door SUV
- Layout: Front-engine, four-wheel-drive (quattro)

The Audi Q7 is a 2- and 3-row E-segment SUV made by the German manufacturer Audi, unveiled in September 2005 at the Frankfurt Motor Show. Production of the Q7 began in November 2005 at the Volkswagen Bratislava Plant in Bratislava, Slovakia.

The Q7 was the first SUV sold by Audi and went on sale in 2006. Later, Audi's second SUV, the Q5, was unveiled as a 2009 model. Audi has since unveiled a third SUV model, the Q3, which went on sale in the third quarter of 2011, and a fourth SUV model, the Q2, which went on sale in November 2016. The Q7 shares a Volkswagen Group MLB platform and chassis with the Bentley Bentayga, Lamborghini Urus, Porsche Cayenne, and the Volkswagen Touareg.

The Q7 is the second largest vehicle from Audi, being surpassed by the Q6 since 2022. While the Q7 has been the flagship SUV in Audi's product portfolio, a top-of-the-line model with a lower roof, called the Q8, was released in 2018. As of 2026, the Audi Q9 takes over as the largest Audi flagship SUV.

It was one of the vehicles involved in the Volkswagen emissions scandal, with the company ordered to buy back some of the affected cars manufactured between 2009 and 2012. The first-generation Q7 was also subject to hundreds of NTSB complaints with many relating to potentially catastrophic engine failure issues, and a class-action lawsuit related to squealing brakes.

== First generation (Typ 4L; 2005) ==
First generation
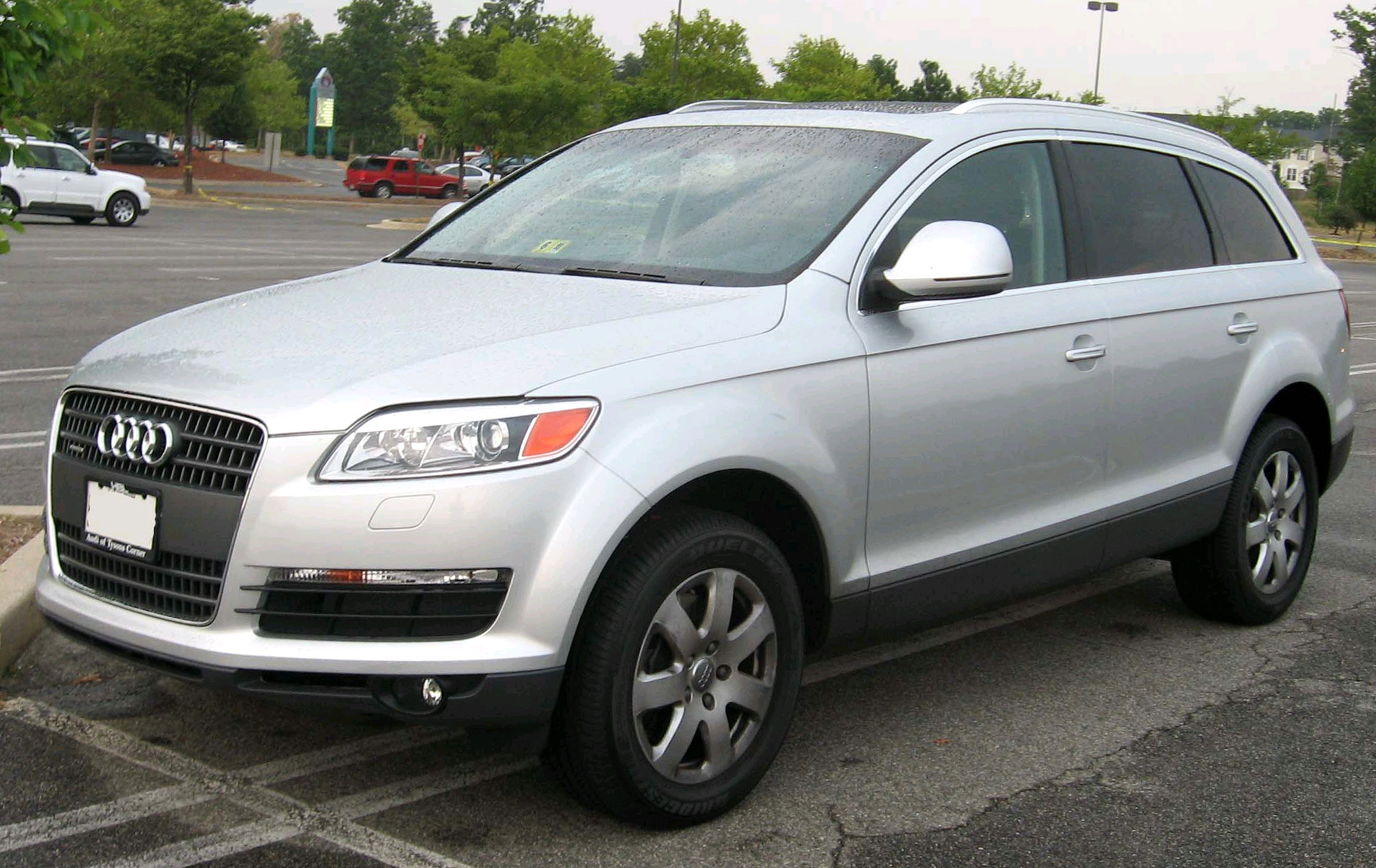
- 2007 Audi Q7

Overview
- Model code: 4L
- Production: November 2005 – 2015
- Model years: 2006–2015 (Europe); 2007–2015 (North America)
- Assembly: Slovakia: Bratislava (Volkswagen Bratislava Plant); India: Aurangabad (Audi India, CKD); Russia: Kaluga (Volkswagen Group Rus)
- Designer: Satoshi Wada (concept design: 2002; production: 2003)

Body and chassis
- Platform: Volkswagen Group PL71 platform
- Related: Porsche Cayenne; Volkswagen Touareg

Powertrain
- Engine: Petrol: 3.0 L TFSI supercharged V6; 3.6 L FSI VR6; 4.2 L FSI V8; Diesel: 3.0 L TDI V6; 4.2 L TDI V8; 6.0 L TDI V12
- Transmission: 6-speed manual 6-speed Aisin/VW TR-60SN/09D automatic 8-speed TL-80SN/TR-82SD automatic

Dimensions
- Wheelbase: 3,002 mm (118.2 in)
- Length: 5,085 mm (200.2 in)
- Width: 1,984 mm (78.1 in)
- Height: 1,737 mm (68.4 in)
- Kerb weight: 2,205–2,605 kg (4,861–5,743 lb)

The Q7 (internally designated Typ 4L) utilizes a modified version of the Volkswagen Group PL71 platform. Previewed by the Audi Pikes Peak quattro concept car, the Q7 is designed more for on-road use, and was not meant for serious off-road use where a transfer case is needed. In an off-road test through the Australian outback it fared well for a "soft roader".

Development began in 2002 under the code AU 716, primarily focused on the Pikes Peak Concept. Design work was frozen for the Concept in July 2002, for presentation at the North American International Auto Show in January 2003. Following the introduction of the concept, full-scale development began on Typ 4L of the PL71 platform.

The production design was frozen in late 2003, for a late 2005 start of production. Prototypes went into testing in 2004, with development concluding in the first half of 2005. It introduced the world's only series production passenger car V12 TDI diesel engine.

Giles Smith, writing for the Guardian described the first-generation Q7 as "the SUV that dwarfs everybody else's SUV." Writing for the Observer, Martin Love described the interior as "a master class in luxury" whilst calling the Q7 "vast, whale-like, bloated ... it's the Lurch of the hard shoulder, a gas-guzzling Zeppelin" and saying "clearly those who buy SUVs couldn't give a monkey's about petrol consumption, but responsible makers such as Audi need to protect these people from themselves." In the Sunday Times, Gavin Conway called the Q7 "vast and intimidating" and said "the whole cabin feels expensively made out of high-quality materials" before noting the lack of space in the third row of seats compared to similar cars from other manufacturers.

Although lacking a low-range transfer case, it has a Quattro permanent four-wheel drive system with a Torsen self-locking central differential which provides an asymmetric 42/58 front-to-rear torque split. A self-levelling air suspension with Continuous Damping Control, called adaptive air suspension, which helps in off-road situations is also available.

As part of the Volkswagen emissions scandal, the car featured software that allowed it to cheat at emissions tests, giving the impression that it emitted far-less harmful nitrogen oxide pollution that it actually does.

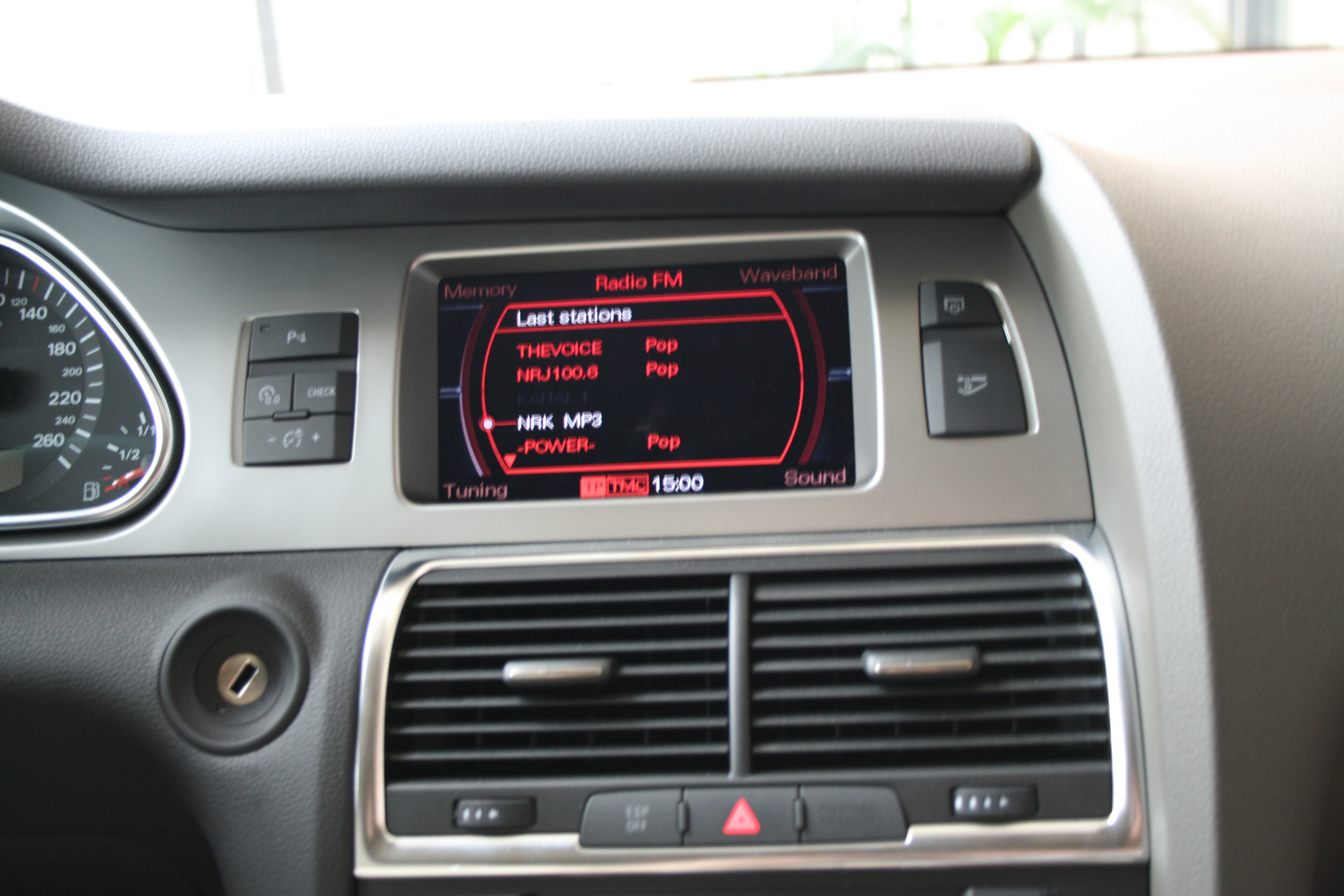
Multi Media Interface on Audi Q7

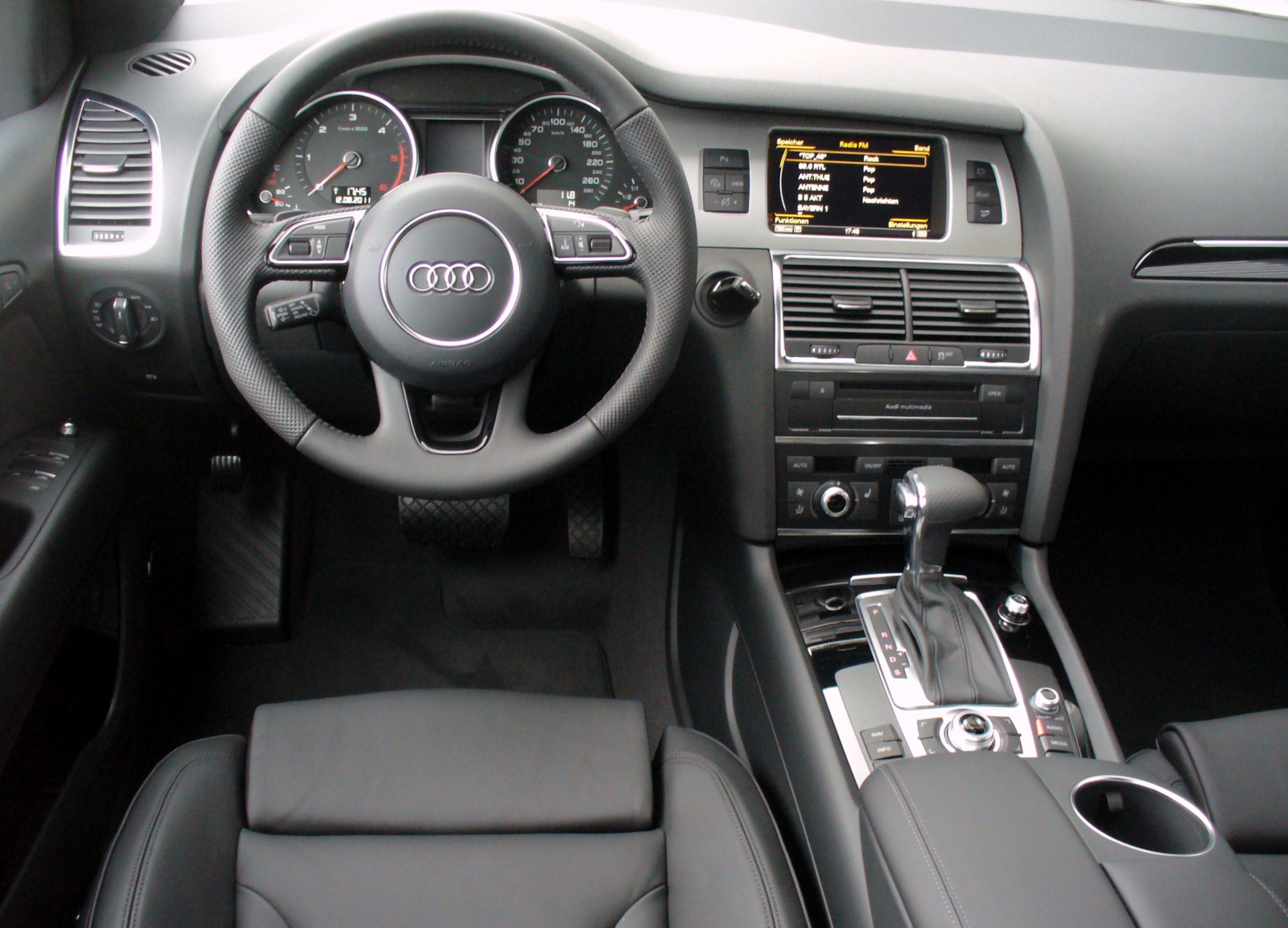
Interior

=== Powertrain ===
Petrol engines
Model	Year	Engine type	Power, torque at rpm
3.6 FSI	2007–2009	3,597 cc (3.597 L; 219.5 cu in) VR6 FSI	280 PS (206 kW; 276 hp) at 6,200, 360 N⋅m (266 lb⋅ft) at 2,500–5,000
4.2 FSI	2007–2010	4,163 cc (4.163 L; 254.0 cu in) V8 FSI	350 PS (257 kW; 345 hp) at 6,800, 440 N⋅m (325 lb⋅ft) at 3,500
Diesel engines
Model	Year	Engine type	Power, torque at rpm
3.0 TDI	2006–2007	2,967 cc (2.967 L; 181.1 cu in) V6 turbo	233 PS (171 kW; 230 hp) at 4,000, 500 N⋅m (369 lb⋅ft) at 1,750–2,750
3.0 TDI	2007–2009	2,967 cc (2.967 L; 181.1 cu in) V6 turbo	240 PS (177 kW; 237 hp) at 4,000–4,400, 550 N⋅m (406 lb⋅ft) at 2,000–2,250
3.0 TDI clean diesel	2009–	2,967 cc (2.967 L; 181.1 cu in) V6 turbo	240 PS (177 kW; 237 hp) at 4,000–4,400, 550 N⋅m (406 lb⋅ft) at 2,000–2,250
4.2 TDi BTR	2007–2009	4,134 cc (4.134 L; 252.3 cu in) V8 turbo	326 PS (240 kW; 322 hp) at 3,750, 760 N⋅m (561 lb⋅ft) at 1,800–2,500
5.9 TDI	2008–2012	5,934 cc (5.934 L; 362.1 cu in) V12 twin turbo	500 PS (368 kW; 493 hp) at 3,750, 1,000 N⋅m (738 lb⋅ft) at 1,750–3,250

0–100 km/h (62 mph) performance for Q7 3.6 VR6 FSI is 8.5 s, 4.2 V8 FSI is 7.4 s and for 5.9 V12 TDI is 5.5 s.

=== Safety ===
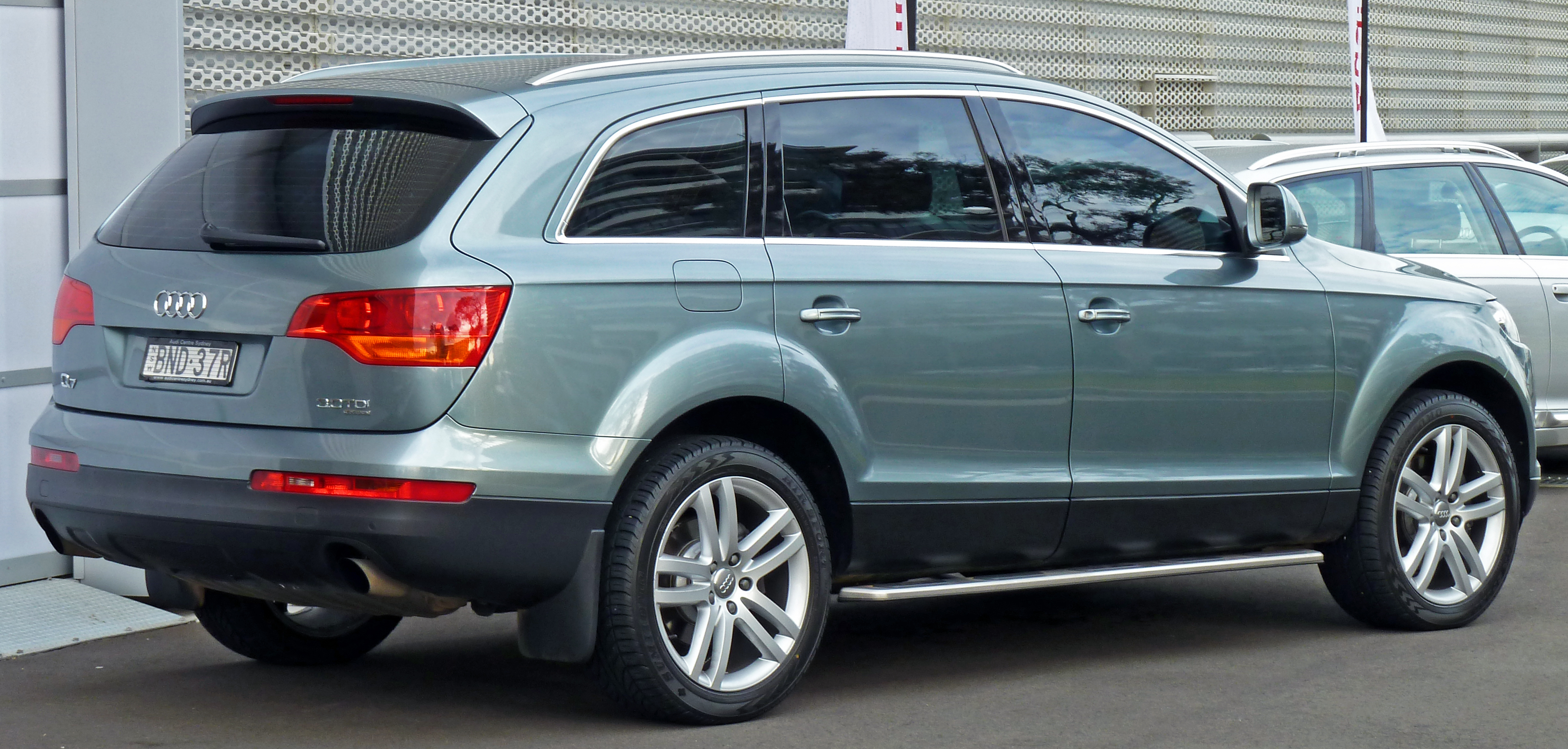
Audi Q7 3.0 TDI quattro (Australia; pre-facelift)

Despite its multiple airbags and safety electronics, such as Electronic Stability Programme (ESP), the Q7 scored four stars out of five in the Euro NCAP crash test for adult occupant protection. According to Audi, this was caused by a design error, and has since been fixed in cars manufactured after the test which should allegedly lead to five stars. Official tests to prove this remain to be done as of March 2009. The Guardian noted that "because of its size and wadded insulation, the Q7 provides its driver with a spectacularly complete illusion of safety" before noting that SUVs are more likely to get into crashes, especially rollovers.

Euro NCAP test results* Audi Q7 VR6 FSI (LHD) (2006)
Test	Score	Rating
Adult occupant:	30	4 /5 stars
Child occupant:	39	4 /5 stars
Pedestrian:	15	2 /4 stars

=== ANCAP ===
ANCAP test results* Audi Q7 variant(s) as tested (2007)
Test	Score
Overall	5 /5 stars
Frontal offset	11.92/16
Side impact	16/16
Pole	2/2
Seat belt reminders	0/3
Whiplash protection	Not Assessed
Pedestrian protection	Marginal
Electronic stability control	Standard

==== IIHS ====
In the United States, the Q7 received five out of five stars from the National Highway Traffic Safety Administration (NHTSA) safety test for both front and side impacts. The Insurance Institute for Highway Safety awarded the Q7 its Top Safety Pick 2009, with Good ratings in all 14 measured categories of the front and side impact test.

The 2015 Q7 has a rollover risk of 18.5%.

IIHS scores (2007 model year)
Moderate overlap frontal offset	Good
Side impact	Good

=== North American models ===
It was first released as 2007 model, with Q7 4.2 quattro available at launch.

=== Q7 hybrid (2005) ===
The Q7 hybrid is a concept vehicle using the engine from the 4.2 FSI with an electric motor to provide 200 N⋅m (148 lb⋅ft) extra torque, and nickel-metal hydride battery. It has 0–100 km/h (62 mph) acceleration time of 6.8 seconds. The vehicle weighs 2,410 kg (5,313 lb), 140 kg (309 lb) heavier than the petrol counterpart.

The vehicle was unveiled at the 2005 Frankfurt Motor Show.

Audi reportedly was going to introduce a hybrid version of the Q7 sometime in the future. However, the low US dollar caused Audi to drop the plans for the US market, but stated limited quantities would be available for the commercial market. Audi's research and development chief, Michael Dick, later announced Q7 hybrid would be produced in limited numbers for test purposes only and that development work would focus on a more advanced lithium-ion battery-based hybrid system for the Q5.

=== Q7 3.0 TDI clean diesel (2010) ===
The Q7 3.0 TDI clean diesel is a version of the 3.0 V6 TDI with selective catalytic reduction. The engine was later used in the next generation of the Q7 for the European market. The 3.0-litre TDI S line can accelerate from 0–60 mph (0–97 km/h) in 8.4 seconds and has a top speed of 134 mph (216 km/h).

US models of the 2009 Audi Q7 TDI Premium went on sale in 2009–15 with a base MSRP of $50,900 (excluding a destination charge of $825, taxes, title or dealer charges).

=== Q7 4.2 TDI (2007–2009) ===
The vehicle was unveiled at the 2007 Geneva Motor Show.

The production version went on sale in the middle of 2007.

=== Q7 V12 TDI (2008–2012) ===
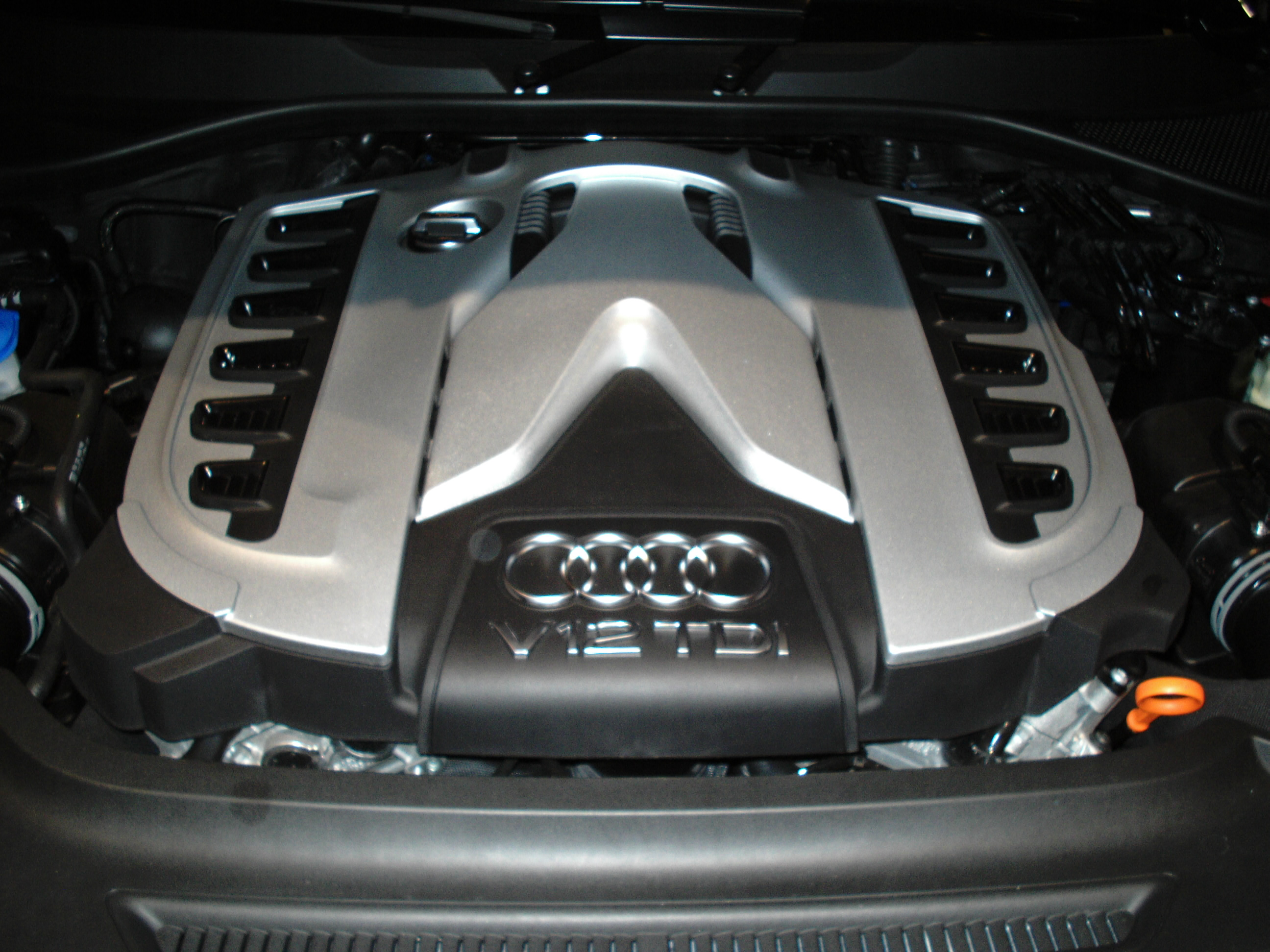
Front view of the installed V12 TDI engine in the Audi Q7 V12 TDI quattro

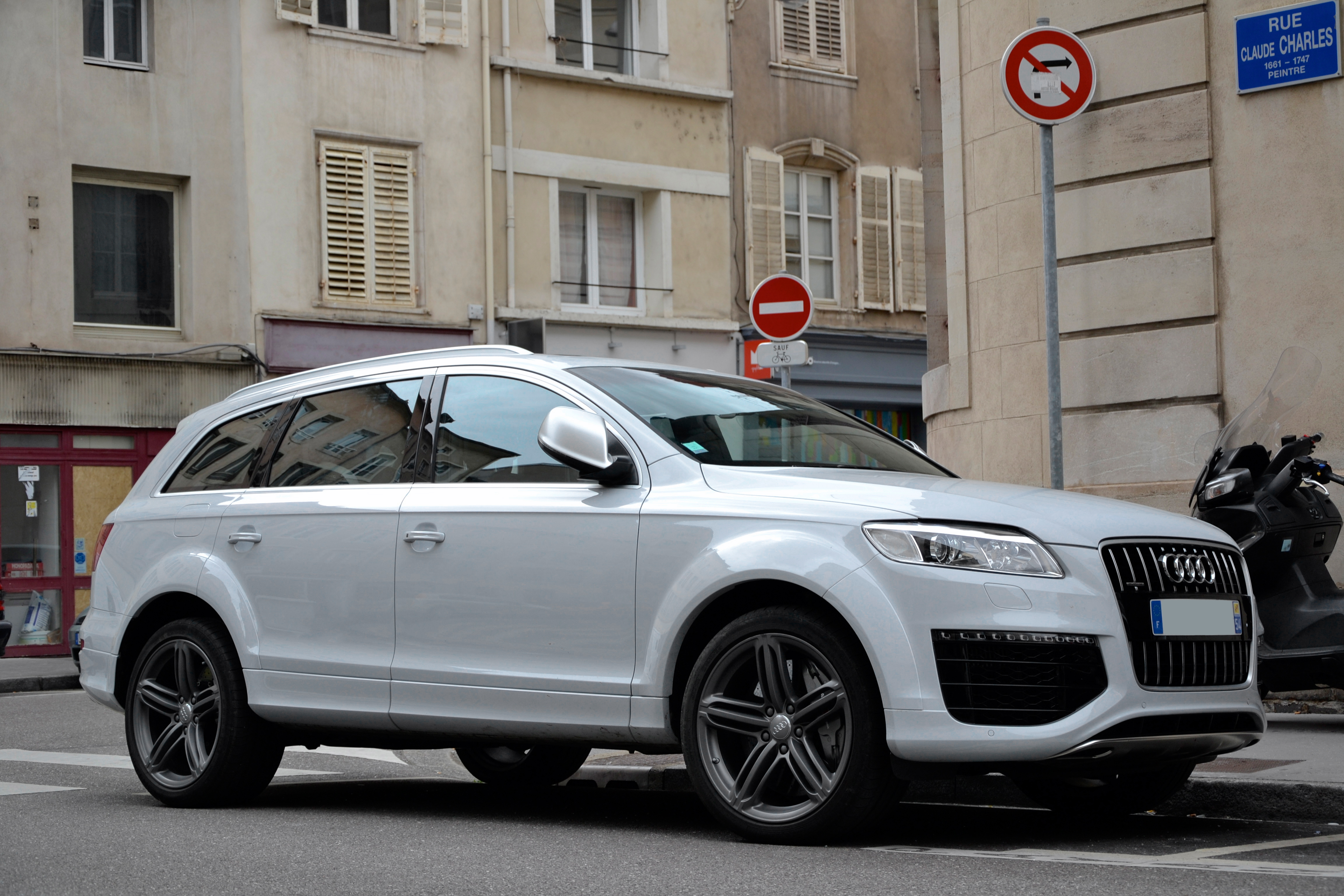
Audi Q7 V12 TDI (2008–2012)

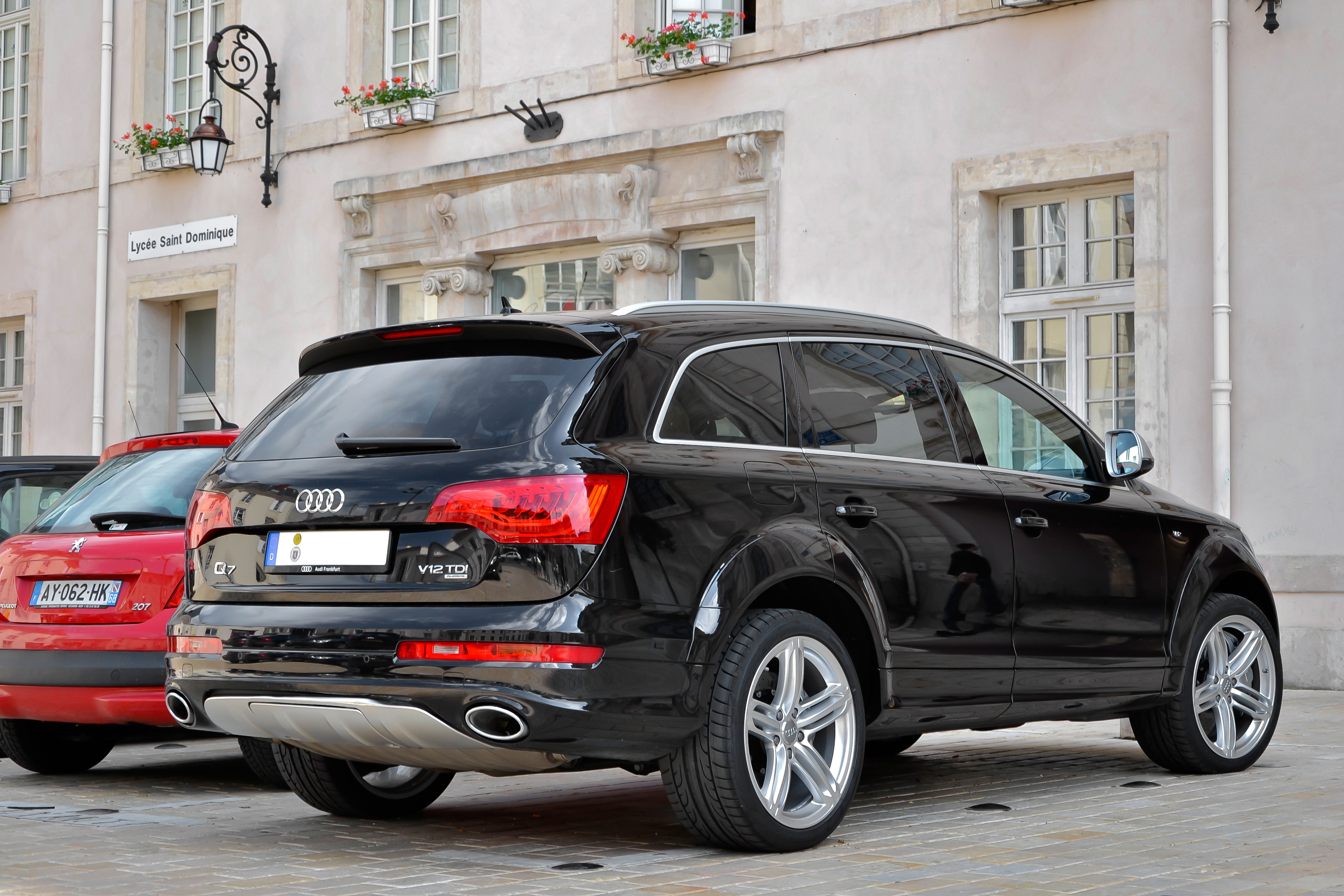
Audi Q7 V12 TDI (2008–2012)

The V12 TDI engine was "based" on the diesel technology from Audi R10 TDI race car, though both engines are completely unrelated: the bore / stroke / angle of the blocks are different and they do not share a single significant component. The only twelve-cylinder diesel engine used in any passenger car, it was rated at 500 PS (368 kW; 493 hp) and 1,000 N⋅m (738 lb⋅ft) of torque. This gives the vehicle a 0–100 km/h (0–62 mph) acceleration time of 5.5 seconds. The Q7 V12 TDI is, according to Audi, the best handling Q7 due to a revised suspension, tires and brakes. Audi claims the Q7 V12 TDI can handle a lateral acceleration of over 0.9 g on a 300-foot (91 m) skid-pad.

Information about the appearance of this version was revealed shortly before the 2006 Paris Motor Show, but the white concept was actually shown in 2007 Detroit. The actual concept differed from the first renderings and anticipated elements that appeared on the 2010 facelift - LED front and rear lights; but the new headlights were not installed on the V12 facelift.

Audi had announced V12 diesel version for the US market using diesel emission treatment technology jointly developed with Volkswagen and Mercedes-Benz under the label "BlueTec". Audi cancelled the plan to federalize the Q7 V12 TDI for the US market due in part to the 2008 financial crisis.

This V12 version is no longer available for the model year 2013 in anticipation of the cosmetic and mechanical update of Q7 for 2014. The auto listing websites, mobile.de and autoscout24.de, have shown the 2012 model year availability of V12 version.

=== Audi Q7 coastline (2008) ===
The Audi Q7 coastline is a concept version of the Q7 V12 TDI that features an Inuit white interior with wood decoration. The design theme was inspired by luxury yachts. The vehicle was unveiled at the 2008 Geneva Motor Show.

=== Facelift (2010–2015) ===
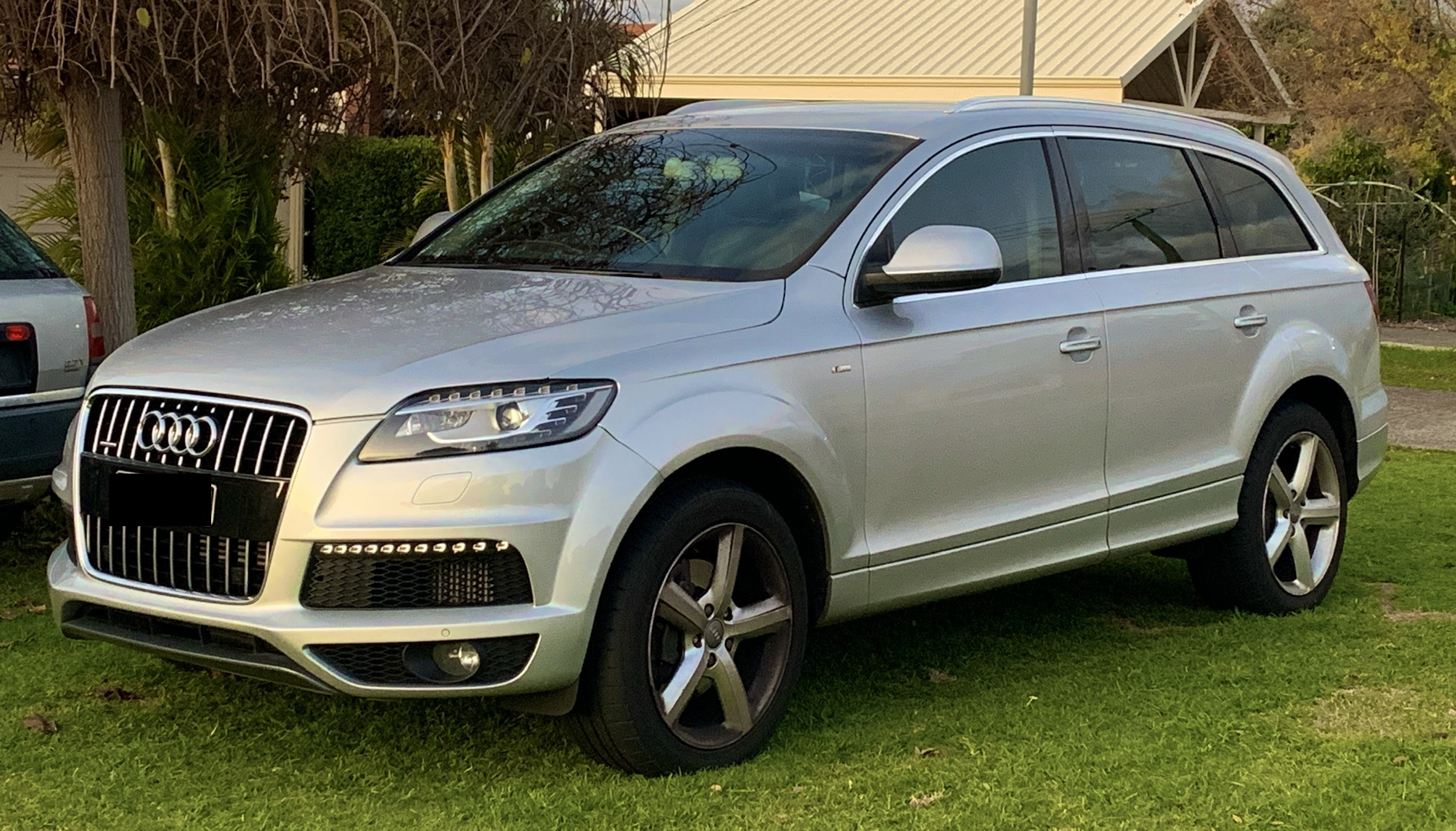
Audi Q7 (Australia; facelift)

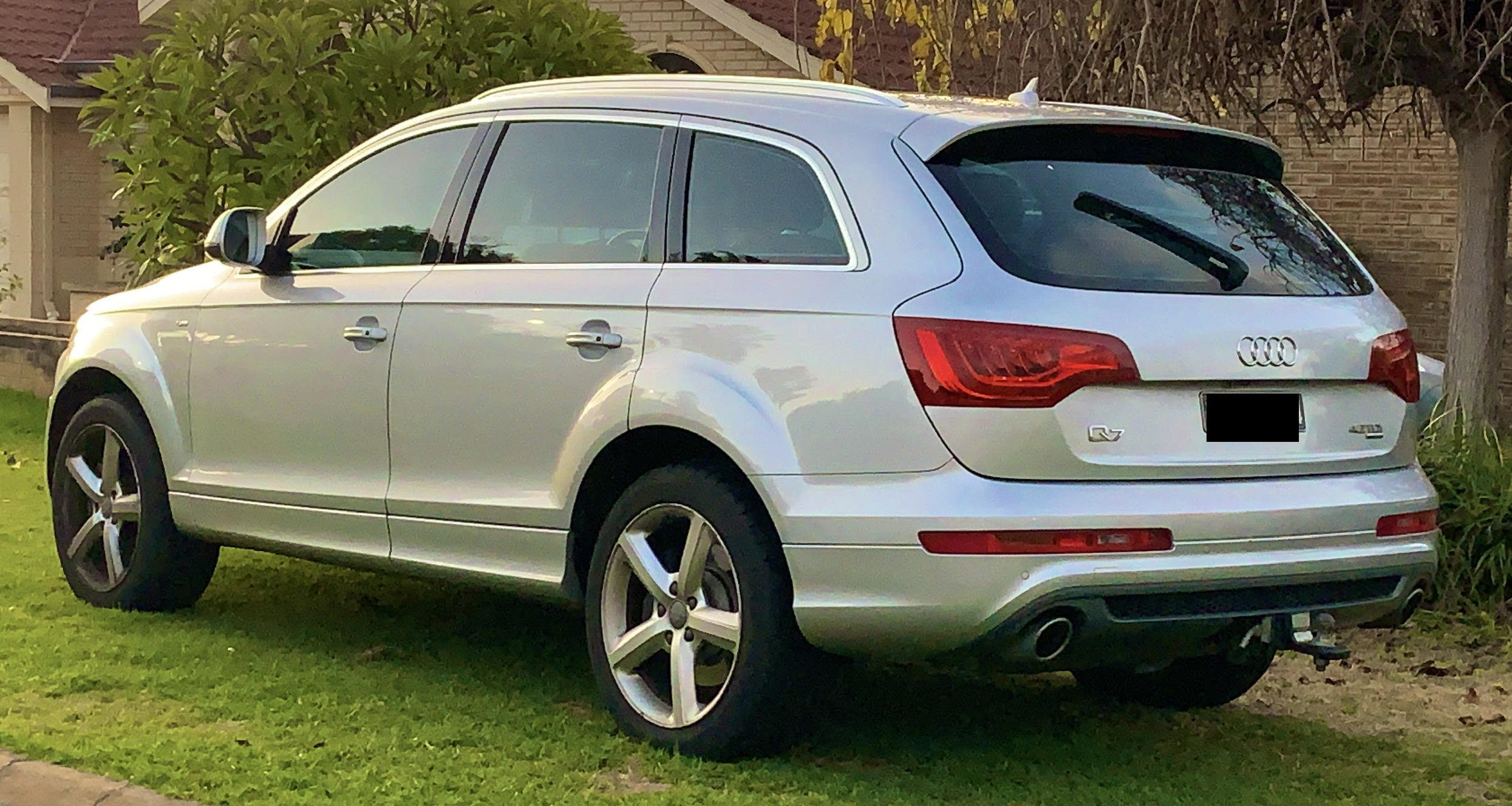
Audi Q7 (Australia; facelift)

The vehicle was unveiled at the 2009 Pebble Beach Concours d'Elegance.

Exterior changes include new front and rear lights which better incorporate LED lighting with optional LED turn signals and daytime running lights, new wheel designs, chrome accents, four new paint colours, and updated body styling in the front and rear.

A redesigned interior includes a new instrument cluster, new leather seating, ambient door lighting, new interior colour choices, new trim, and the third generation MMI control system.

=== Q7 3.0 TDI clean diesel quattro (2009–2015) ===
It is a version of 3.0 TDI with selective catalytic reduction. CO_{2} emission was reduced to 234 g/km with Euro 6 certification, but the vehicle is 50 kg (110 lb) heavier.

Per the Popular Mechanics Oct 2009 issue, at 72.5 mph with an RPM of 2,200–2,500 (the sweet spot of the top 6th gear), the car achieved a 29.6 MPG of diesel. The 8-speed transmission, available 2011 and later, was 11–14% more fuel-efficient than the previous 6-speed transmission (available since 2009–2010 model year) in U.S. models.

=== Q7 2011 ===
A brand new facelift brought optional LED headlights, an 8-speed transmission, start/stop fuel-saving technology, CO_{2} rating reduced to 195 g/km, and a wraparound tailgate design. Also, more flat and metallic colours became available and 21-inch titanium-effect wheels became an optional extra. Certain models achieved upwards of 37 MPG ^{IMP}. The 3.6 L V6 and 4.2 L V8 petrol engines, both of which are naturally aspirated, have been replaced by 3.0 L supercharged V6 petrol engines. One of the supercharged engines puts out 272 hp (203 kW) and 295 lb⋅ft (400 N⋅m) of torque. The other engine, also found in the Audi S4 and Audi S5 Cabrio, puts out 333 hp (248 kW) and 325 lb⋅ft (441 N⋅m) of torque is used in the S-line Prestige Q7. Both engines have the same fuel economy.

=== Q7 2012 ===
Audi added their new Audi Connect to the MMI system, which adds internet-driven POI search, via user input or the voice control system, as well as access to online services delivering local fuel prices, news, weather and other information. Audi Connect also offers in-car WiFi connectivity for up to 8 devices.

2012 was the last model year for the V12 version.

=== US models ===
The vehicles were introduced in 2006 as 2007 models. Available models include 3.6 FSI Quattro and 4.2 FSI Quattro.

Changes include standard LED taillights with available LED turn signals and daytime running lights and SIRIUS traffic system.

The production version went on sale in July 2006.

For 2011, the 3.6 FSI and 4.2 FSI engines were replaced by two 3.0 L TFSI supercharged engines. The base version develops 272 hp (203 kW) (280 hp (209 kW) for 2012) and 295 lb⋅ft (400 N⋅m) of torque, while the S-Line has 333 hp (248 kW) and 325 lb⋅ft (441 N⋅m) of torque.

The V12 Diesel engine is not available in the United States.

=== Powertrain ===
Petrol engines
Model	Year	Engine type	Power, torque at rpm
3.0 TFSI quattro	2010–	2,995 cc (2.995 L; 182.8 cu in) supercharged V6 FSI	272 PS (200 kW; 268 hp) at 4,750–6,500, 400 N⋅m (295 lb⋅ft) at 2,150–4,780
3.0 TFSI quattro S-Line	2010–	2,995 cc (2.995 L; 182.8 cu in) supercharged V6 FSI	333 PS (245 kW; 328 hp) at 5,500–6,500, 440 N⋅m (325 lb⋅ft) at 2,900–5,300
3.6 FSI quattro	2010–	3,597 cc (3.597 L; 219.5 cu in) VR6 FSI	280 PS (206 kW; 276 hp) at 6,200, 360 N⋅m (266 lb⋅ft) at 2,500–5,000
4.2 FSI quattro	2010–	4,163 cc (4.163 L; 254.0 cu in) V8 FSI	350 PS (257 kW; 345 hp) at 6,800, 440 N⋅m (325 lb⋅ft) at 3,500
Diesel engines
Model	Year	Engine type	Power, torque at rpm
3.0 TDI quattro	2009–	2,967 cc (2.967 L; 181.1 cu in) V6 turbo	240 PS (177 kW; 237 hp) at 4,000–4,400, 550 N⋅m (406 lb⋅ft) at 2,000–2,250
4.2 TDI quattro	2009–	4,134 cc (4.134 L; 252.3 cu in) V8 twin turbo	340 PS (250 kW; 335 hp) at 4,000, 760 N⋅m (561 lb⋅ft) at 1,750–3,000
6.0 TDI quattro	2009–	5,934 cc (5.934 L; 362.1 cu in) V12 twin turbo	500 PS (368 kW; 493 hp) at 3,750, 1,000 N⋅m (738 lb⋅ft) at 1,750–3,250

=== Transmission ===
All models include a 6-speed Tiptronic automatic transmission as standard which is made by Aisin and is shared with the Porsche Cayenne and Volkswagen Touareg. A 6-speed manual transmission was offered only in Europe on the first generation Q7 with the 3.6-litre engine. From 2010 (2011 model year in the U.S.), the Aisin–Toyota 8-speed automatic transmission is standard.

== Second generation (Typ 4M; 2015) ==
Second generation
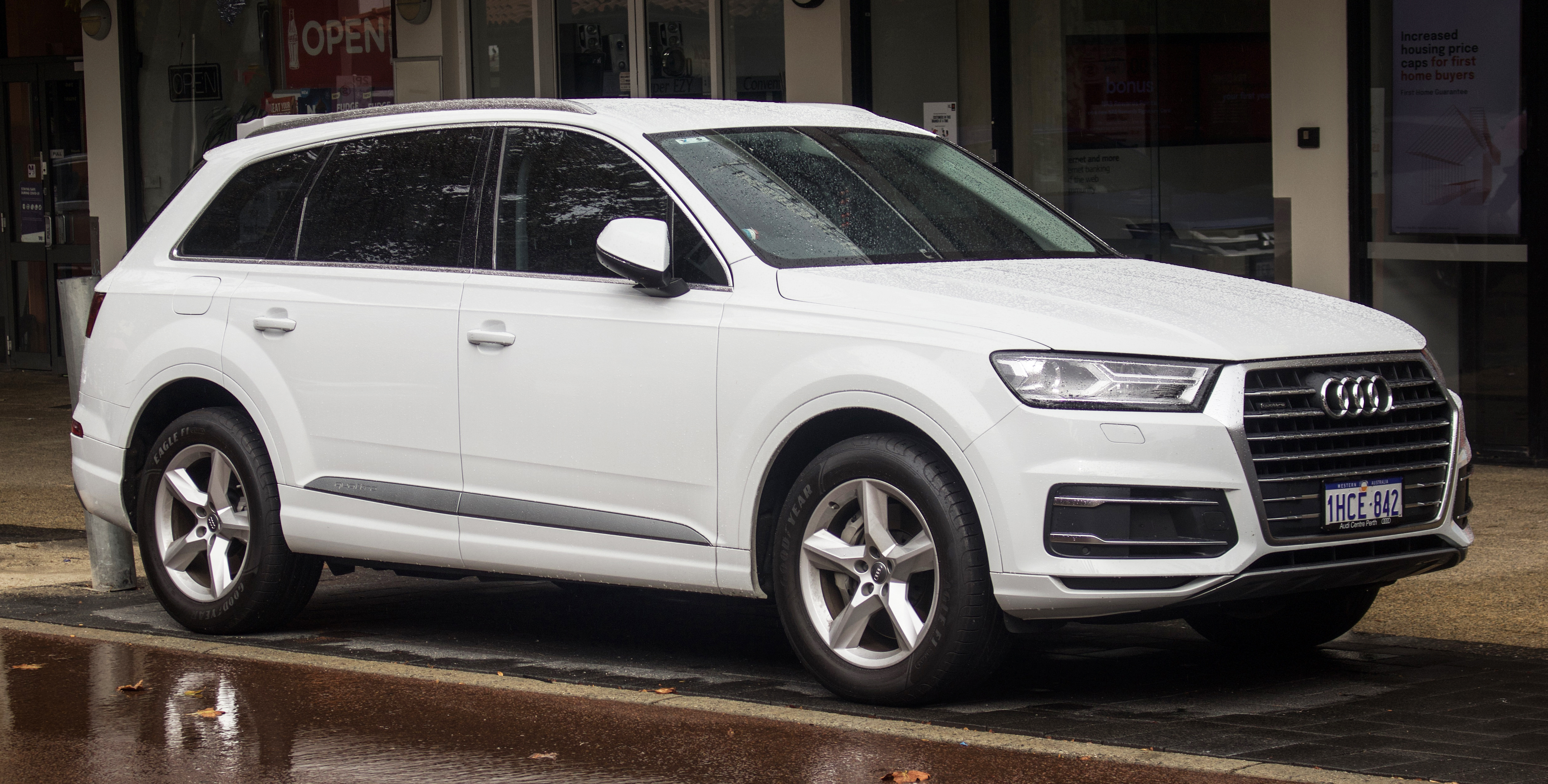

Overview
- Model code: 4M
- Production: May 2015 – 2026
- Model years: 2016–2026
- Assembly: Slovakia: Bratislava (Volkswagen Bratislava Plant); India: Aurangabad (Audi India); Russia: Kaluga (Volkswagen Group Rus); Malaysia: Pekan (HICOM)
- Designer: Wolfgang Egger (2012, 2013)

Body and chassis
- Platform: Volkswagen Group MLB Evo
- Related: Volkswagen Touareg Mk3; Bentley Bentayga; Audi Q8; Lamborghini Urus; Porsche Cayenne Mk3

Powertrain
- Engine: Petrol: 2.0 L TFSI I4; 3.0 L supercharged V6; 3.0 L TFSI V6; 4.0 L TFSI V8; Petrol plug-in hybrid: 2.0 L TFSI I4; 3.0 L TFSI V6 (Q7 e-tron TFSI); Diesel: 3.0 L TDI V6; 4.0 L TDI V8; Diesel plug-in hybrid: 3.0 L TDI V6 (Q7 e-tron TDI)
- Transmission: 8-speed ZF 8HP automatic

Dimensions
- Wheelbase: 2,994 mm (117.9 in)
- Length: 5,052 mm (198.9 in)
- Width: 1,968 mm (77.5 in)
- Height: 1,741 mm (68.5 in)
- Curb weight: 1,910–2,445 kg (4,210–5,390 lb)

The second generation Audi Q7 was unveiled in January 2015 at the North American International Auto Show in Detroit. The diesel- and petrol-powered versions were released for retail sales in 2015, followed shortly by diesel-powered plug-in hybrid variant, which is sold in Europe, but not in Canada.

Regardless of engine, all Q7's come with a ZF 8HP 8-speed automatic transmission and a Quattro Permanent all-wheel drive system with a self-locking center differential and a default 40:60 front-to-rear torque split. Depending on available traction, up to 70% of available power can be diverted to the front axle, or up to 85% to the rear axle, without ESP intervention.

In 2016, the BBC noted the Q7 as one of several models on the market which were too large to fit in a standard parking space.

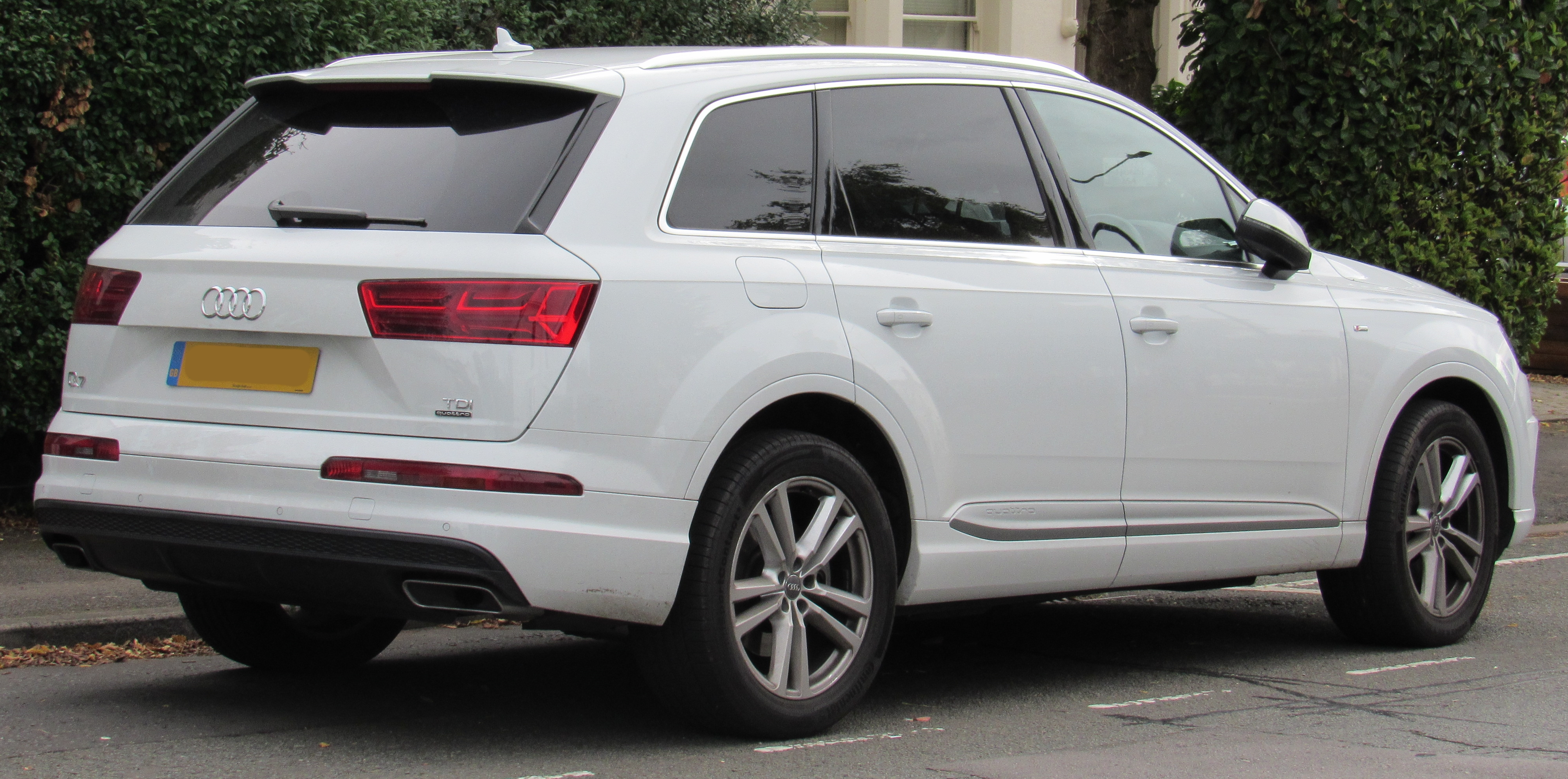
Q7 (rear view)

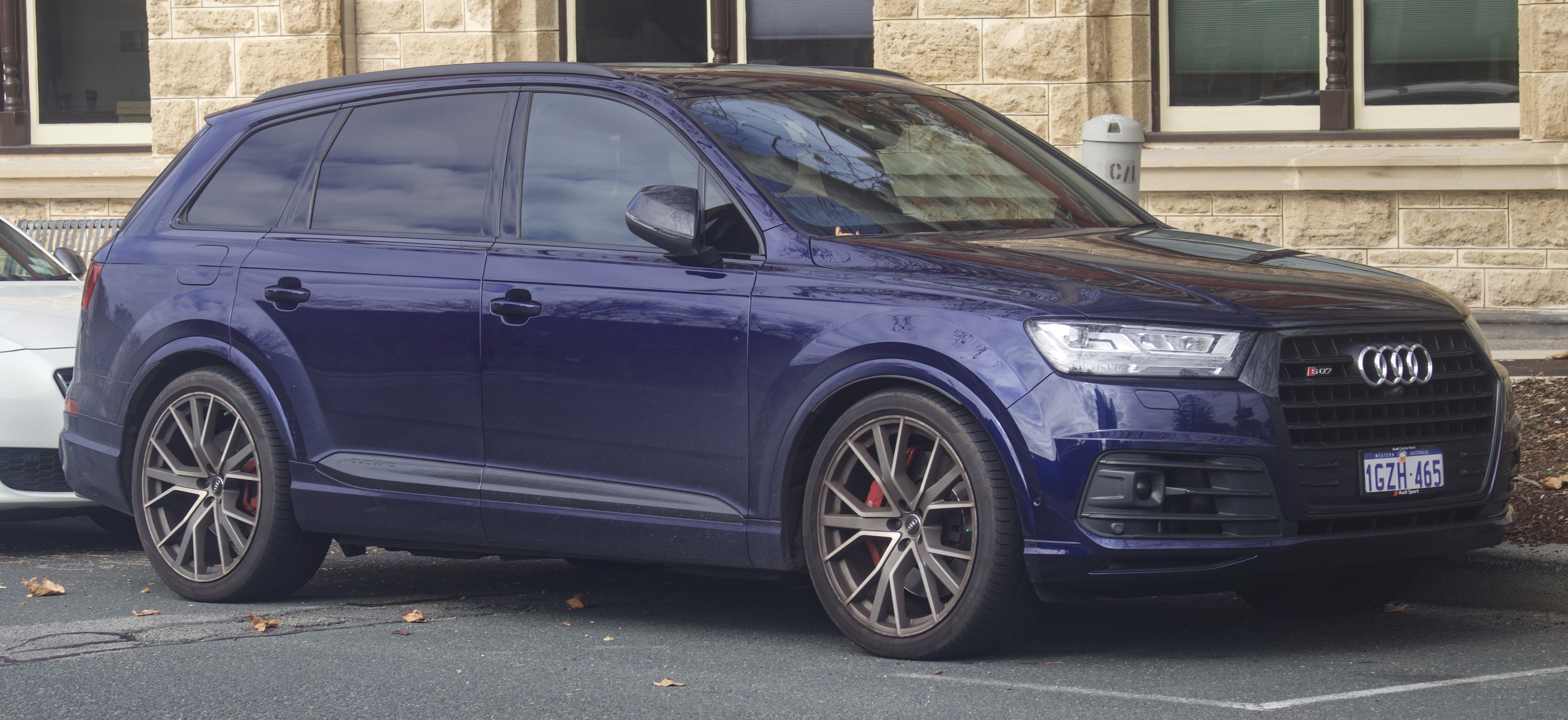
SQ7

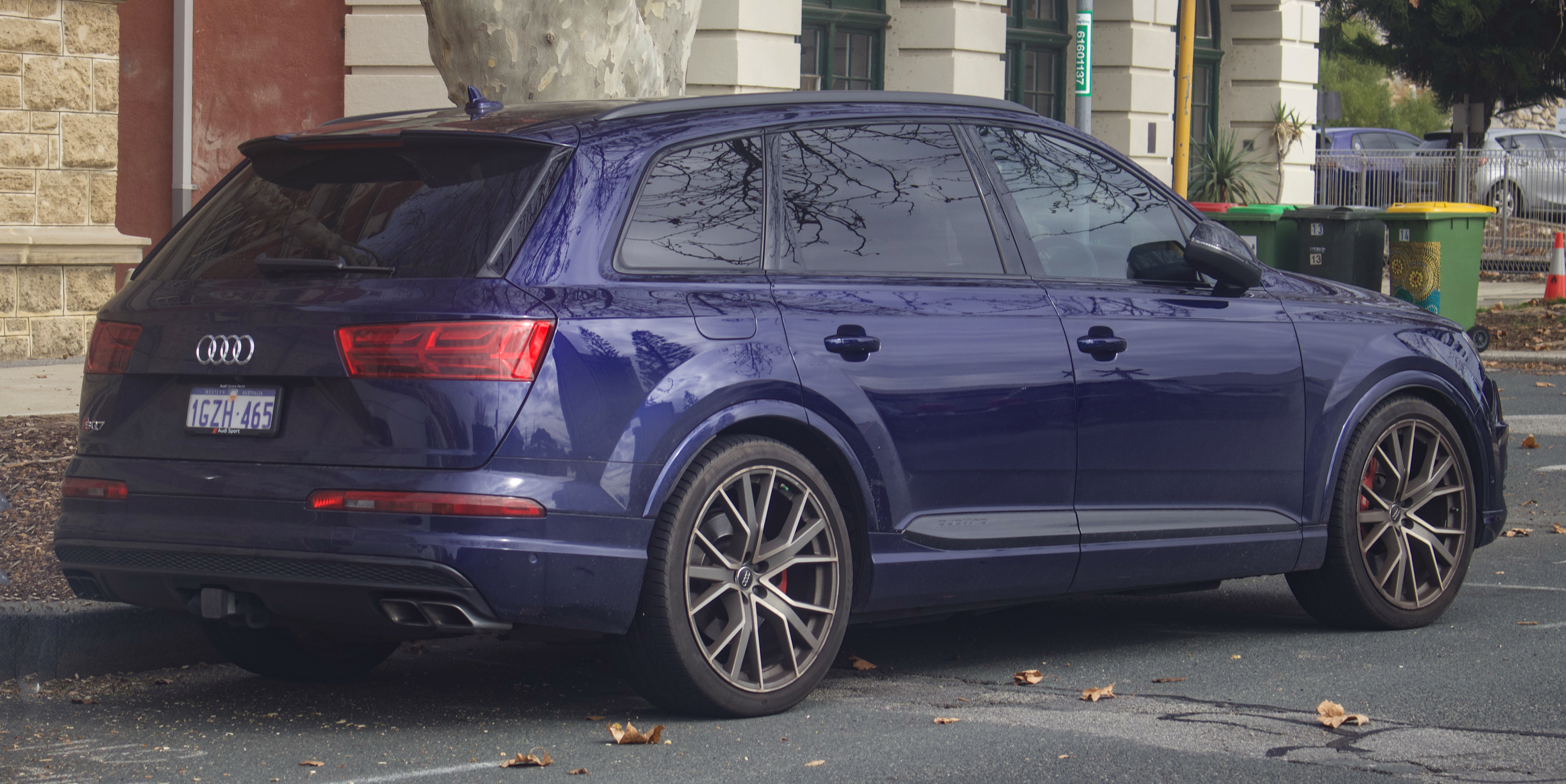
SQ7 (rear view)

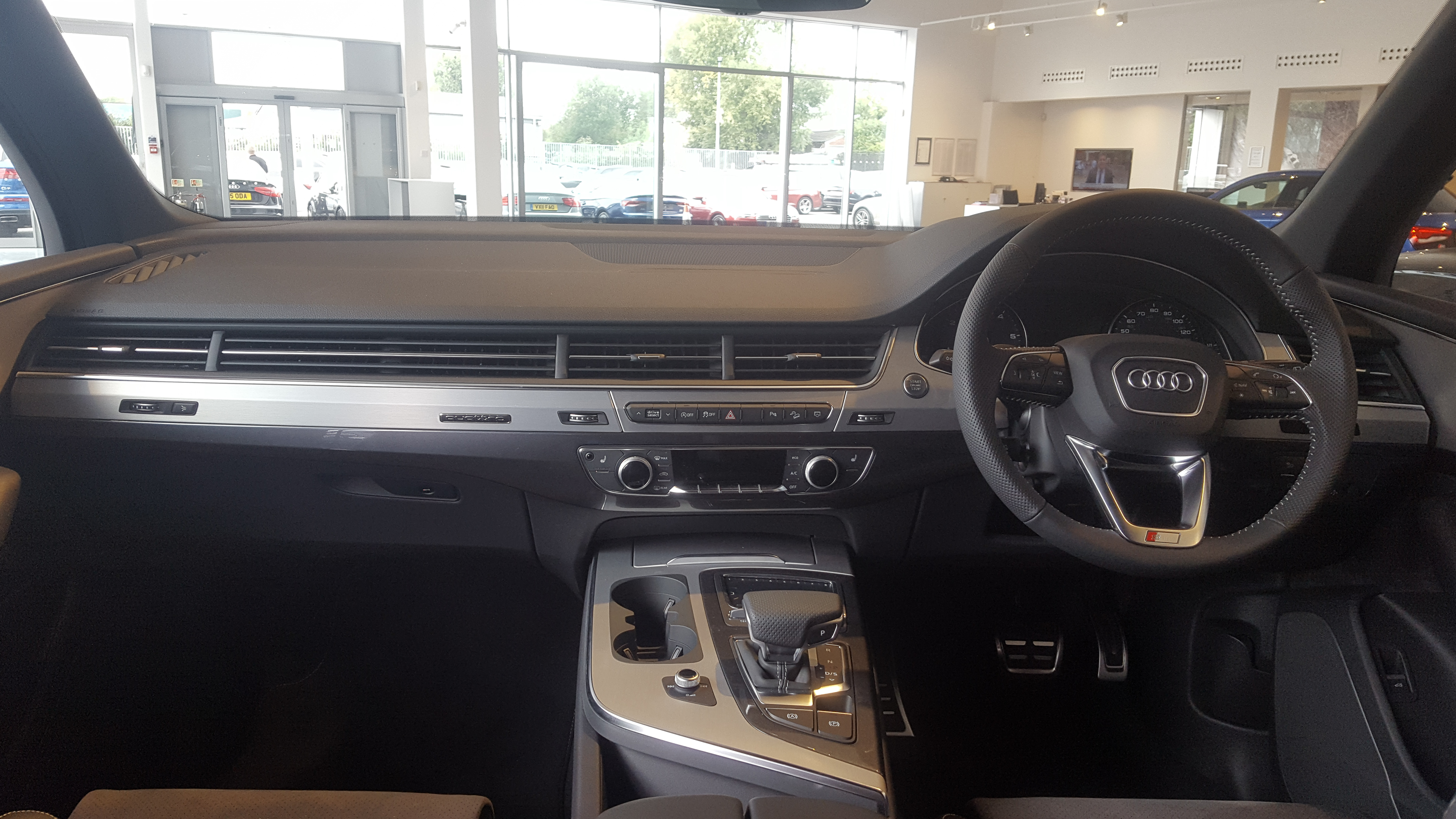
Interior

=== Q7 e-tron ===
The plug-in hybrid, called the Q7 e-tron TDI Quattro, is powered by a 3.0-litre TDI V6 turbo-diesel engine mated with an electric motor-generator placed in the 8-speed automatic gearbox to provide a maximum output power of 190 kW (255 hp) and a maximum torque of 600 N⋅m (443 lbf⋅ft) four-wheel drive. An electronically controlled clutch can disconnect the V6 engine from the rest of the powertrain. The 94 kW (126 hp) electric motor is powered by a 17.3 kWh lithium-ion battery capable of delivering an all-electric range of 54 to 56 km (34 to 35 mi). The Q7 e-tron produces CO_{2} emissions between 50 and 48 g/km, and has a fuel consumption of 1.8 to 1.9 l/100 km (160 to 150 mpg_{‑imp}; 130 to 120 mpg_{‑US}) under the New European Driving Cycle (NEDC). The Irish Independent found these official fuel economy claims to be completely unrealistic, although they noted that the 40 to 50 miles per imperial gallon (7.1 to 5.6 L/100 km; 33 to 42 mpg_{‑US}) they achieved in their tests to be "still exceptional for a large SUV like this". The Q7 e-tron accelerates from zero to 100 km/h (62 mph) in 6.2 seconds in hybrid mode, and 0–60 km/h (0–37 mph) in 6.5 seconds in all-electric mode. Its top speed in hybrid mode is 230 km/h (143 mph) and 135 km/h (84 mph) in electric mode.

Audi announced the Q7 e-tron TFSI at the 2015 Shanghai Auto Show, developed specially for Asian markets (China, South Korea, Singapore and Japan). Its 2.0 TFSI and electric motor deliver 270 kW (362 hp) and 700 N⋅m (516 lb⋅ft) of system torque – enough to accelerate from 0 to 100 km/h (62 mph) in 5.9 seconds and for a top speed of 220 km/h (137 mph). The standard consumption of 2.5 litres of fuel (94.1 US mpg) corresponds to CO_{2} emissions of less than 60 grams per kilometer (96.6 g/mi). All-electric range will be up to 53 km (33 mi). Audi's marketing of the model has led to accusations of greenwashing.

Due to its large size and poor environmental record, Environmental Action Germany nominated the Q7 plug-in hybrid for their Goldener Geier (Golden Vulture) 2020 award.

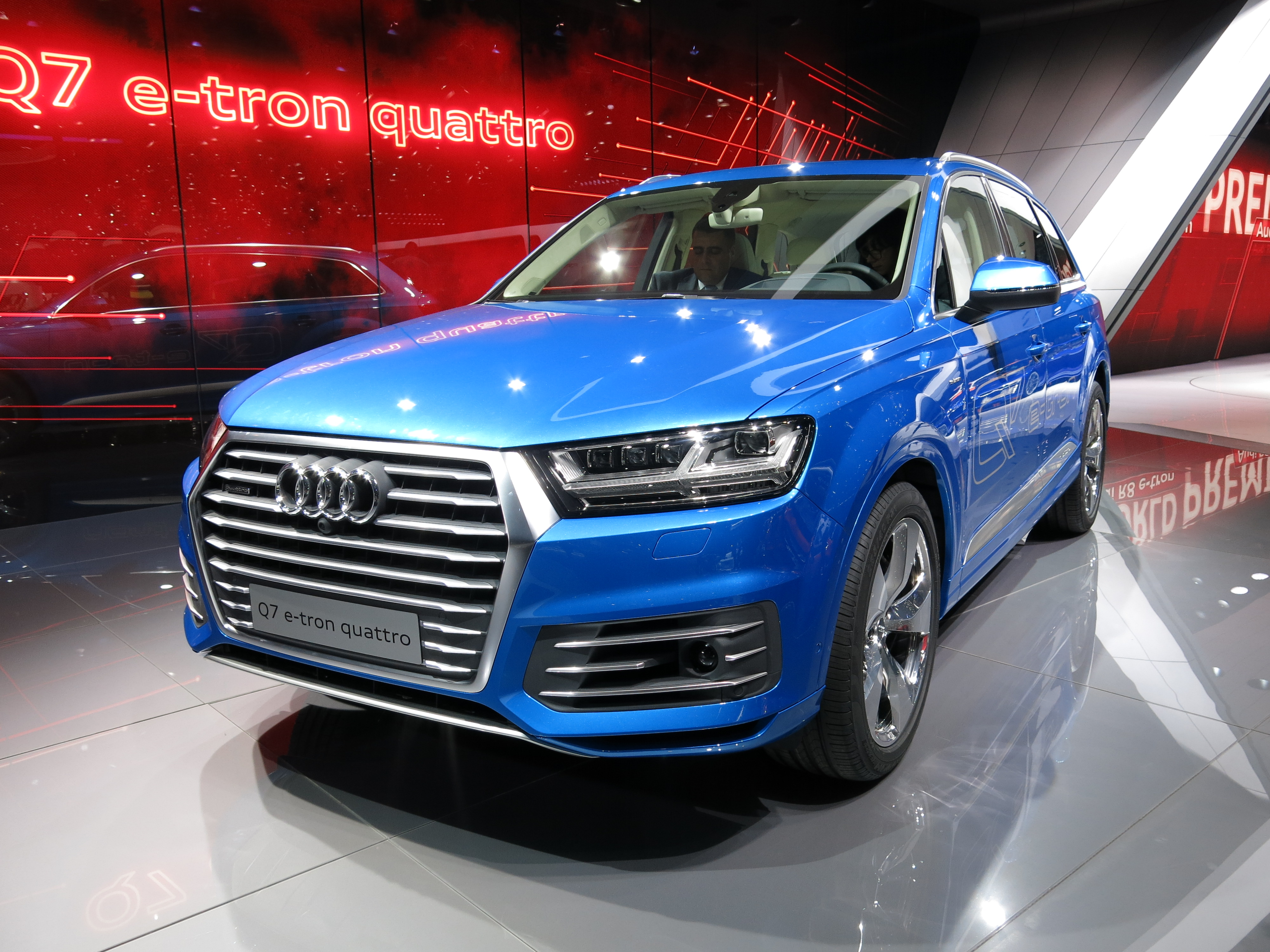
Audi Q7 e-tron 3.0 TDI Quattro plug-in hybrid

=== Markets ===
The second generation of the Q7 is the first of the Q7 to be sold in Bangladesh.

The Q7 2.0 TFSI (1984 cc, 252 PS (249 hp; 185 kW)) is also available in the Russia, United States, Canada, India, the Middle East, and Southeast Asia.

For Marvel Studios' Captain America: Civil War Audi debuted a commercial for the SQ7 directed by the Russo brothers featuring unreleased scenes from the car chase feature in the film as well as providing several SQ7 and other vehicles for the film.

=== 2020 facelift ===
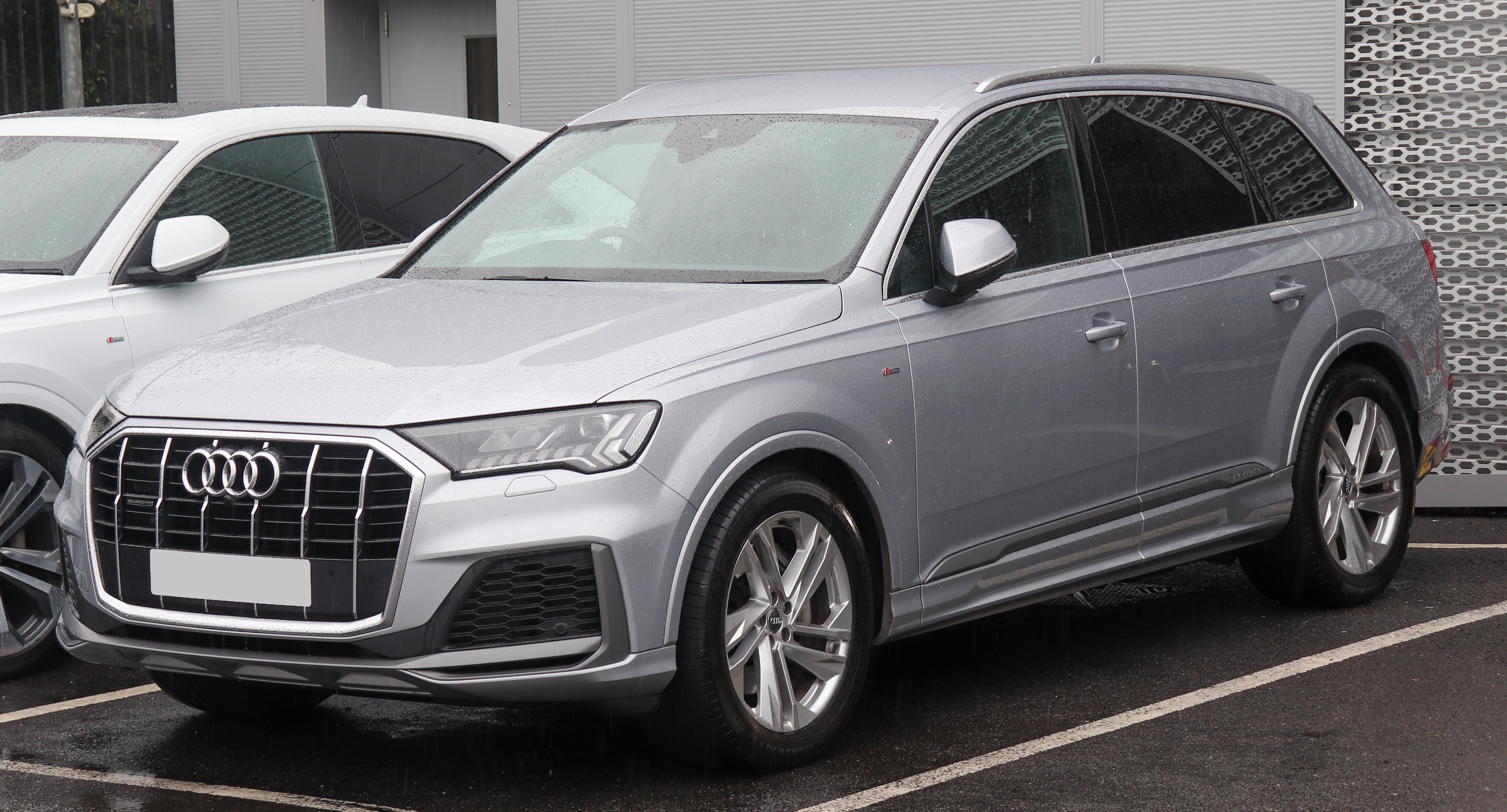

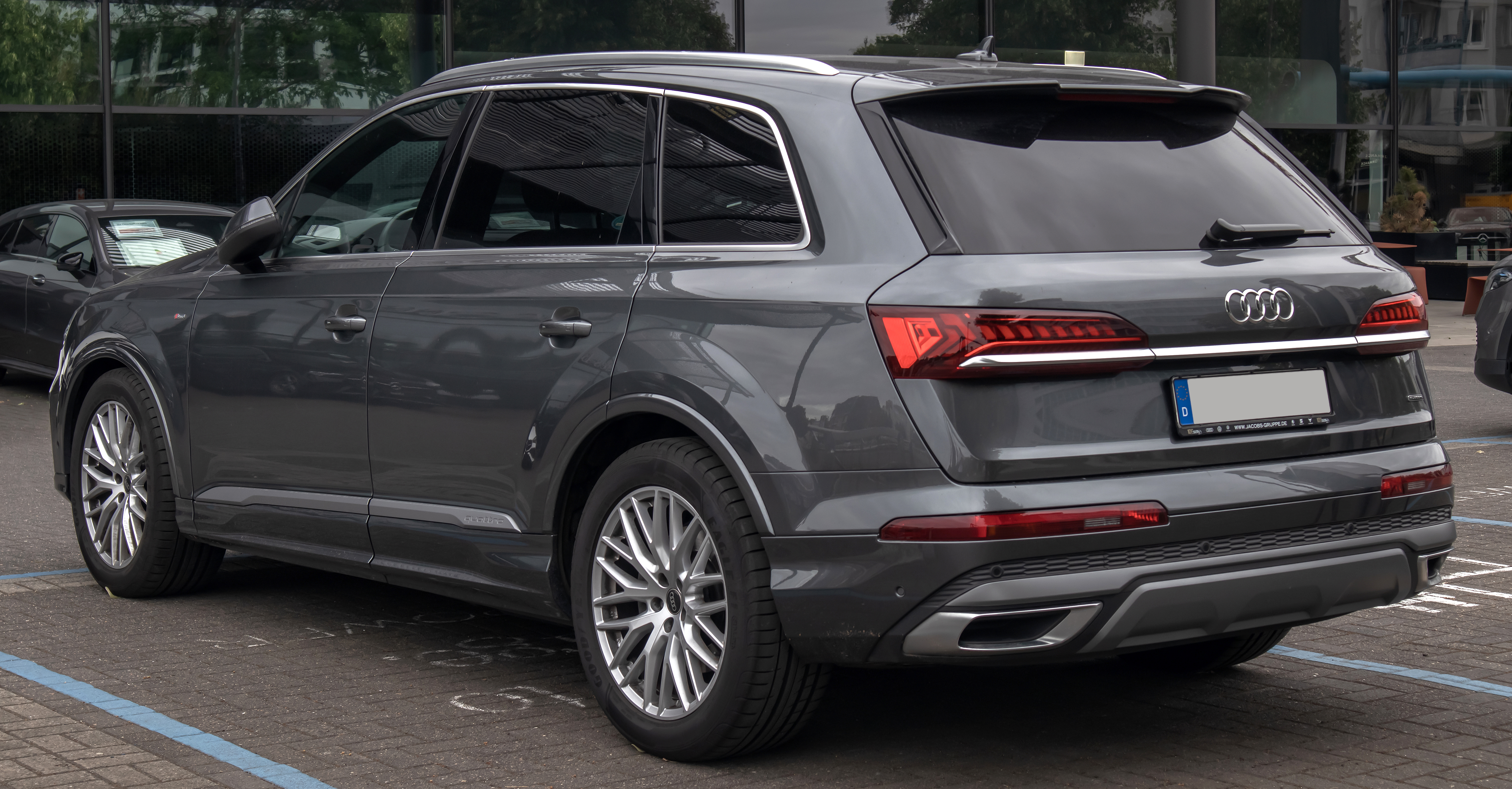
2020 facelift (Q7)

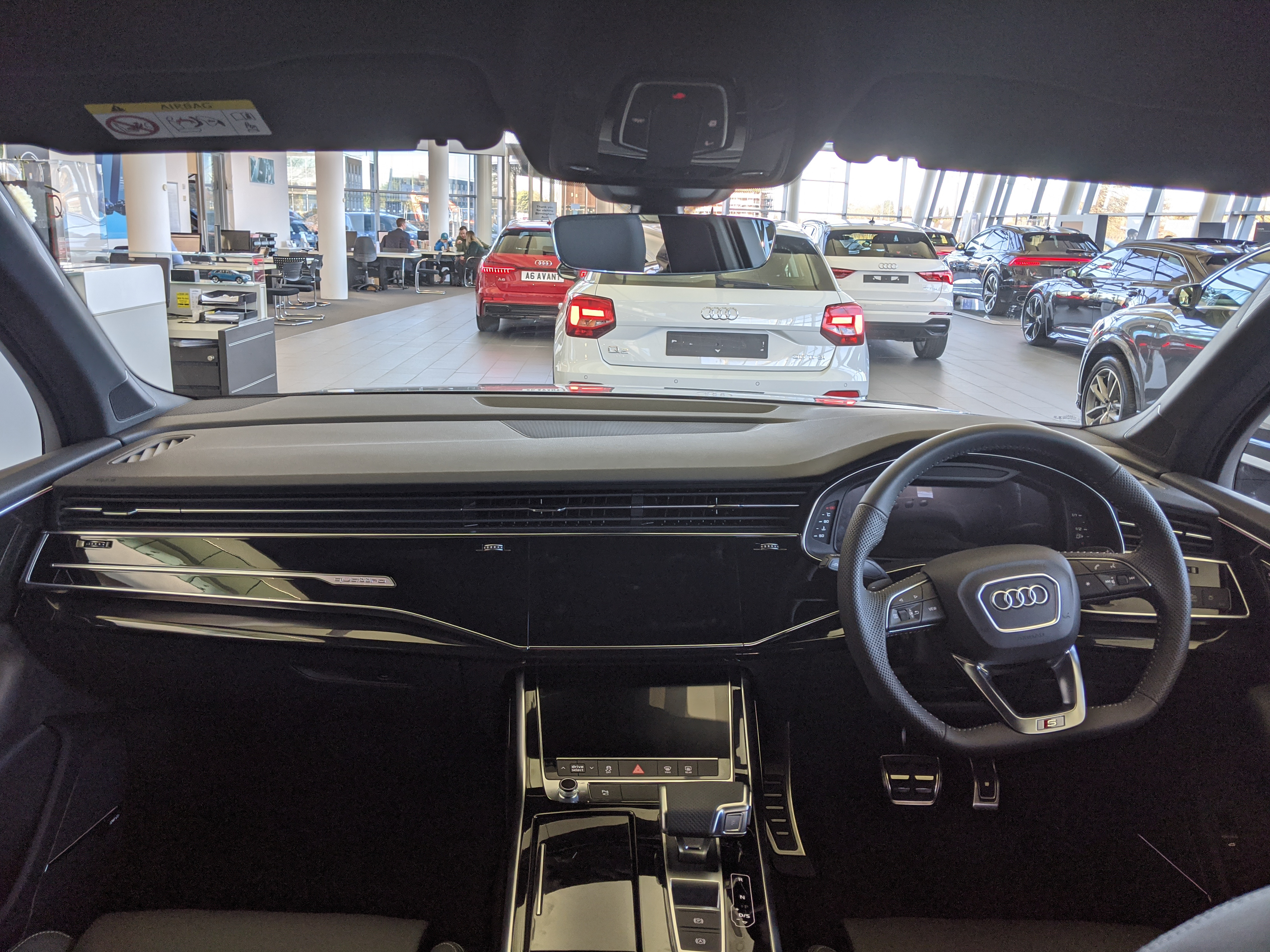
Interior

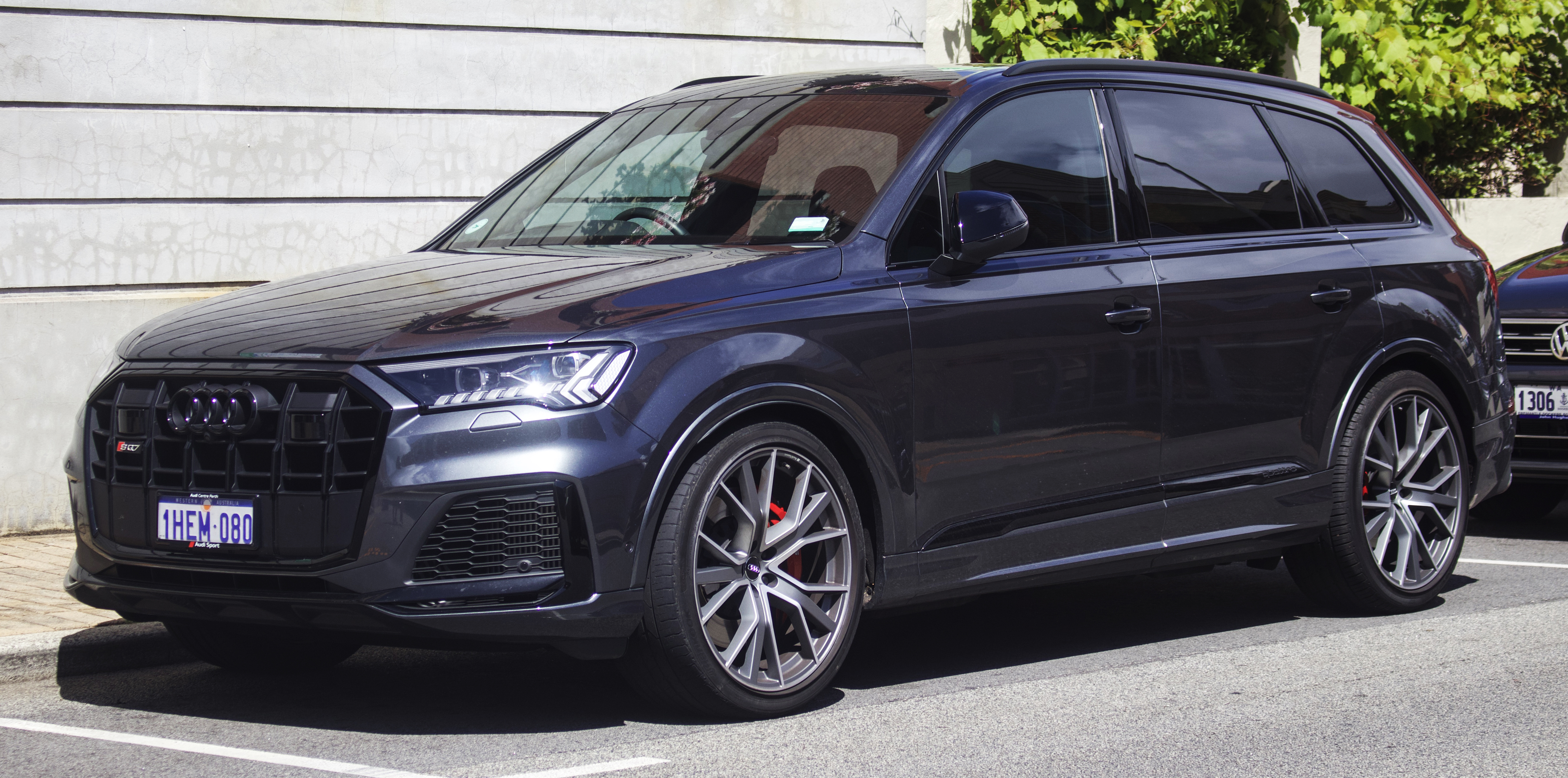

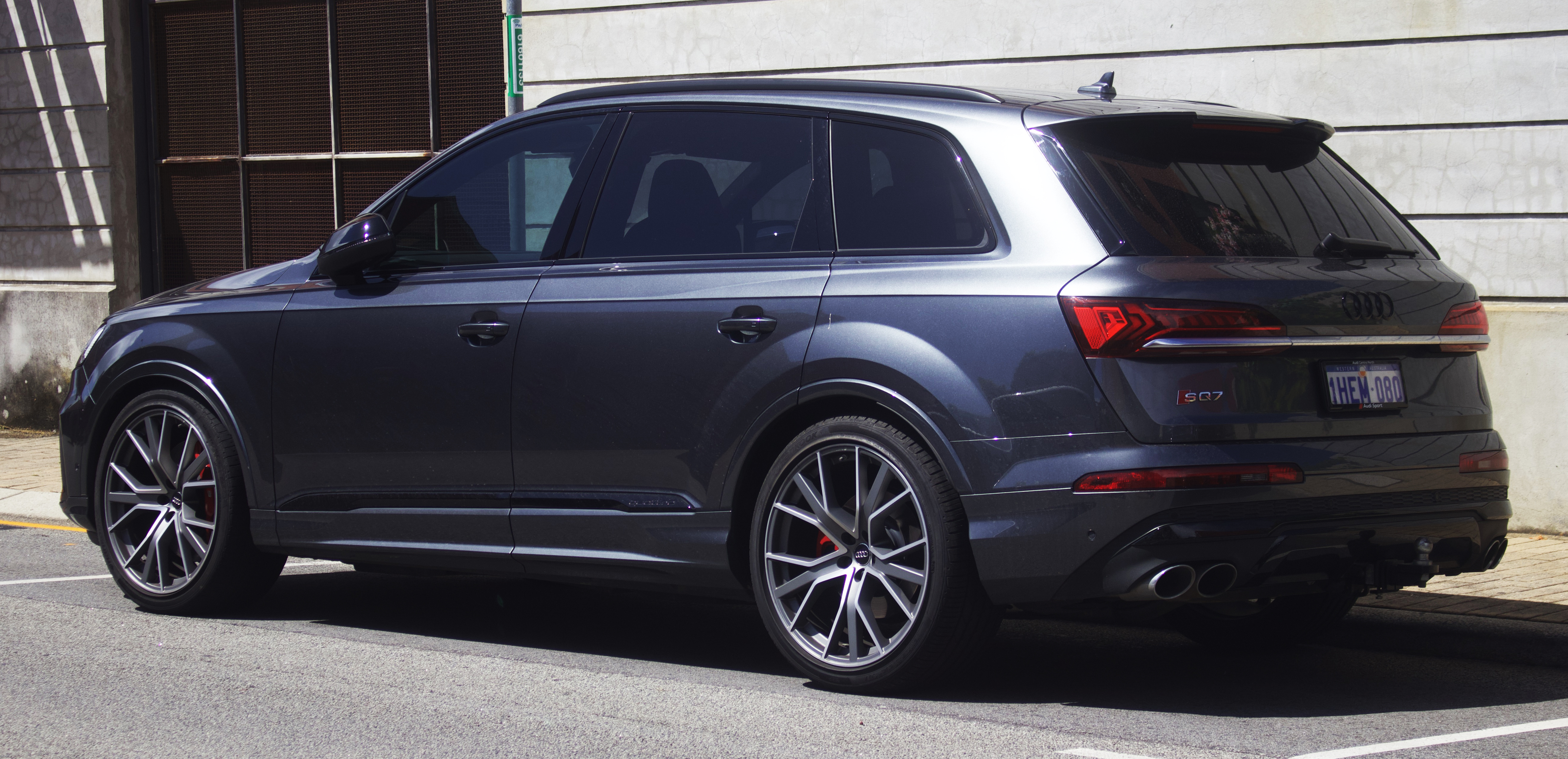
2020 facelift (SQ7)

The Q7 was facelifted for the 2020 model year, introducing styling tweaks such as a redesigned grille, front and rear bumpers, new side sills, chrome trim for the tailgate and revised exhaust tips. It comes with two-tone paint as standard, which highlights the front splitter, side skirts, wheel arches and rear diffuser in anthracite, a range of mild-hybrid powertrains and refined chassis. Inside, Audi installed a new infotainment system with dual touchscreens. The dashboard and centre console were also updated to accommodate the new system.

LED headlights are included as standard, Matrix LEDs or HD Matrix LEDs and Audi Laser Light are offered as additional cost options. The HD Matrix LEDs and Audi Laser Light combine automatic controlled high beam with small laser module in each unit to double the range of the Q7's full beam.

Air suspension is included as standard (only on Prestige and Technik trims in US and Canada, respectively). Audi has also expanded the Q7's options list to include a new active roll-stabilisation system (only available on SQ7 Prestige and SQ7 in US and Canada, respectively). It provides active anti-roll bars, controlled by a 48-volt electric motor that automatically adjust to reflect the driving style and road conditions.

Three mild-hybrid 3.0-litre V6 powertrains are available, with the choice of two diesels and one petrol. The entry-level 45 TDI diesel produces 228 bhp (170 kW; 231 PS) and 500 N⋅m (369 lb⋅ft) of torque with a claimed 0–62 mph (0–100 km/h) time of 7.1 seconds and a top speed of 142 mph (229 km/h). Mid-range 50 TDI models produce 282 bhp (210 kW; 286 PS) and 600 N⋅m (443 lb⋅ft) of torque, delivering a 0–62 mph (0–100 km/h) of 6.3 seconds and a top speed of 150 mph (241 km/h). The 55 TFSI petrol model comes with 335 bhp (250 kW; 340 PS) and 500 N⋅m (369 lb⋅ft) of torque, with a claimed 5.6 seconds and a 155 mph (249 km/h) electronically limited top speed. An eco-focused plug-in hybrid 55 TFSI e version will be introduced a few months after initial sales.

Audi also offers a performance-focused SQ7 version, powered by a 429BHP (that can be upgraded to max 650 hp) 4.0-litre V8 turbodiesel with 900 N⋅m (664 lb⋅ft) of torque; it has a claimed 0–62 mph (0–100 km/h) time of 4.8 seconds and a limited top speed of 155 mph (249 km/h). The US model will use a V8 engine with the same displacement (shared with the US-market SQ8), albeit fueled by petrol and producing 500 bhp (370 kW; 510 PS) and 770 N⋅m (568 lb⋅ft) of torque; it went on sale in the second quarter of 2020.

Sales in the UK started from September 2019.

The SQ7 offers a TFSI variant with a 4.0 twin-turbocharged V8 petrol engine delivers 500 bhp (370 kW; 510 PS) and 770 N⋅m (568 lb⋅ft) of torque. It accelerates from 0–62 mph (0–100 km/h) within 4.3 seconds and on to a maximum speed of 155 mph (249 km/h).

=== 2025 facelift ===
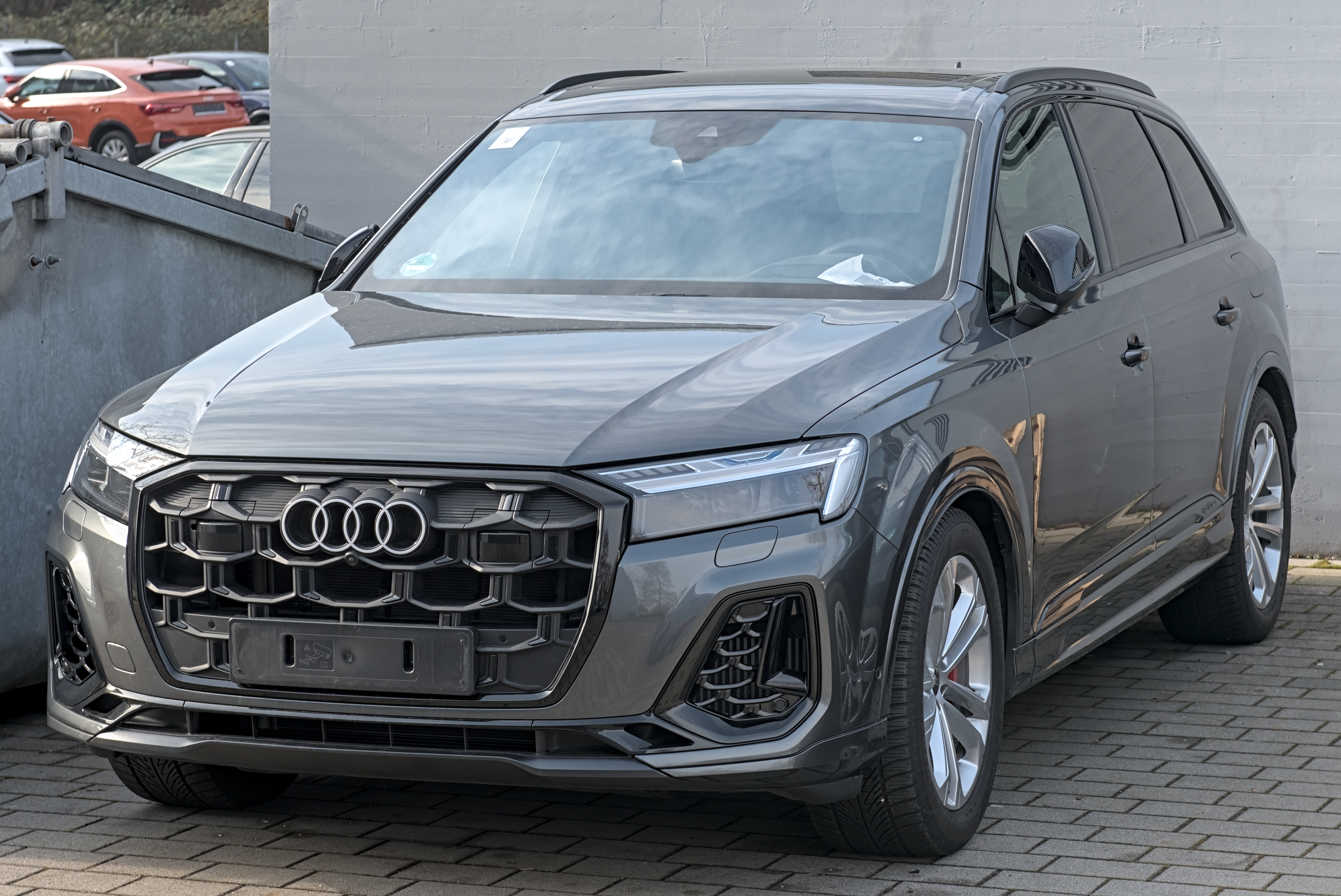

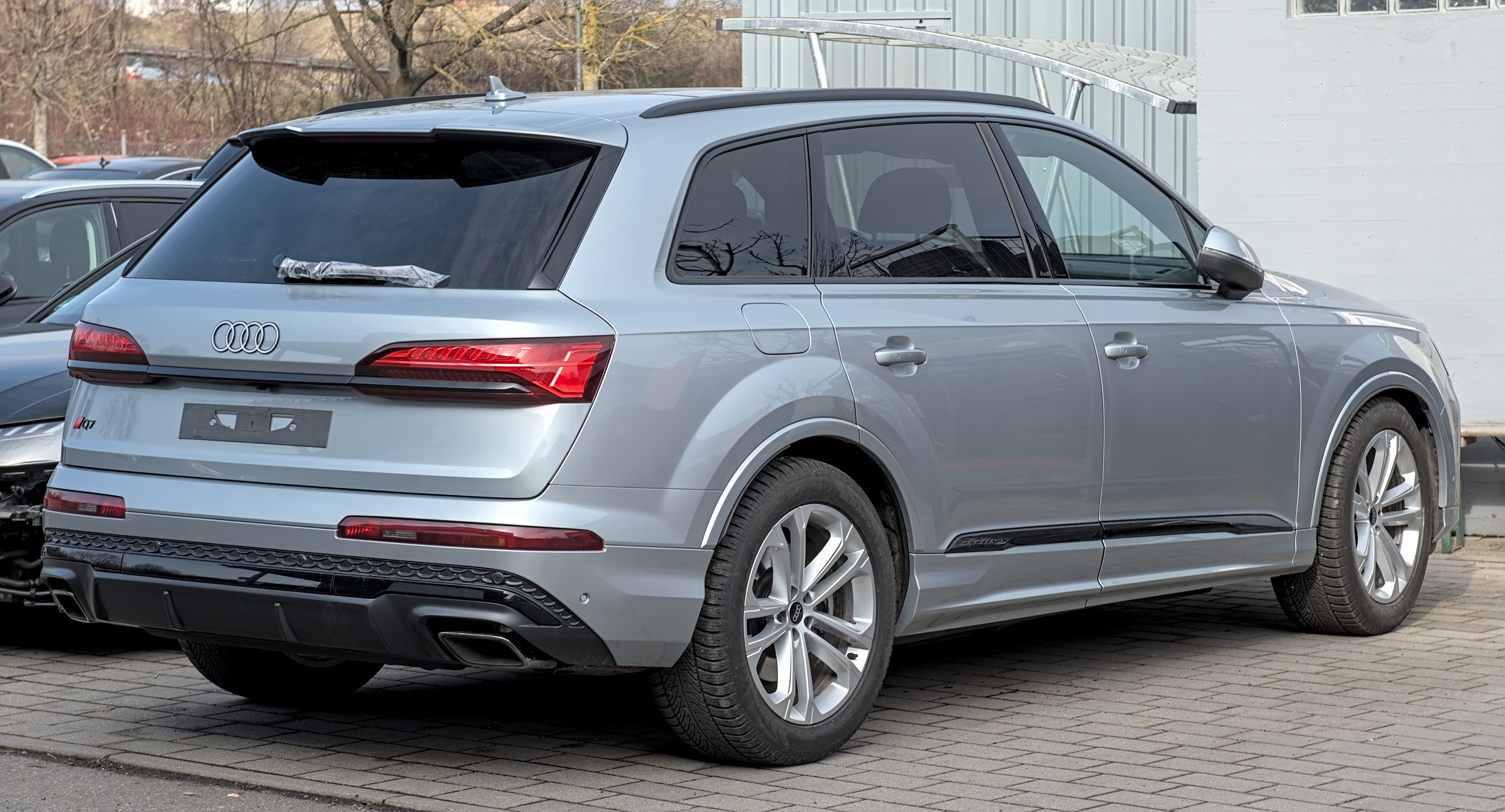
2024 facelift

Audi announced a second facelift in January 2024 for the 2025 model year, introducing further enhancement to the front and rear headlight design, whilst offering features such as HD Matrix LED headlights featuring a Laser high-beam and different lighting signatures, while the OLED rear lights feature their own new design.

=== Powertrains ===
Model	Year(s)	Type	Power	Torque	0–100 km/h (0–62 mph)
Petrol engines
2.0 TFSI (45 TFSI)	2016–	1,984 cc (121.1 cu in) I4 turbo (EA888)	252 PS (249 hp; 185 kW)	370 N⋅m (273 lbf⋅ft)	6.9 s
3.0 TFSI	2016–2019	2,995 cc (182.8 cu in) V6 supercharger (EA837)	333 PS (328 hp; 245 kW)	440 N⋅m (325 lbf⋅ft)	5.7 s
3.0 TFSI (55 TFSI)	2019–	2,995 cc (182.8 cu in) V6 turbo (EA839)	340 PS (340 hp; 250 kW)	450 N⋅m (332 lbf⋅ft)	5.7 s
2.0 TFSI e-tron	2016–2018	1,984 cc (121.1 cu in) I4 turbo (EA888) + 17.3 kWh battery	367 PS (362 hp; 270 kW)	700 N⋅m (520 lbf⋅ft)	5.9 s
55 TFSI e (PHEV system)	2019–	2,995 cc (182.8 cu in) V6 turbo + 17.3 kWh battery	381 PS (376 hp; 280 kW)	600 N⋅m (443 lbf⋅ft)	5.6 s
60 TFSI e (PHEV system)	2019-	2,995 cc (182.8 cu in) V6 turbo + 17.3 kWh battery	456 PS (450 hp; 335 kW)	700 N⋅m (516 lbf⋅ft)	5.4 s
SQ7 TFSI	2020–	3,956 cc (241.4 cu in) V8 twin-turbo	507 PS (500 hp; 373 kW)	770 N⋅m (568 lbf⋅ft)	4.3s
Diesel engines
3.0 TDI ultra	2015–2018	2,967 cc (181.1 cu in) V6 turbo	218 PS (215 hp; 160 kW)	500 N⋅m (369 lbf⋅ft)	7.1 s
45 TDI	2019–	2,967 cc (181.1 cu in) V6 turbo	231 PS (228 hp; 170 kW)	500 N⋅m (369 lbf⋅ft)	7.1 s
3.0 TDI	2015–2018	2,967 cc (181.1 cu in) V6 turbo	272 PS (268 hp; 200 kW)	600 N⋅m (443 lbf⋅ft)	6.3 s
50 TDI	2019–	2,967 cc (181.1 cu in) V6 turbo	286 PS (282 hp; 210 kW)	600 N⋅m (443 lbf⋅ft)	6.3 s
3.0 TDI e-tron	2016–2018	2,967 cc (181.1 cu in) V6 turbo + 17.3 kWh battery	387 PS (382 hp; 285 kW)	700 N⋅m (516 lbf⋅ft)	6.2 s
SQ7 TDI	2016–2020	3,956 cc (241.4 cu in) V8 twin-turbo	435 PS (429 hp; 320 kW)	900 N⋅m (664 lbf⋅ft)	4.8 s

=== Safety ===
==== ANCAP ====
ANCAP test results* Audi Q7 3.0L diesel variants with standard seats only (2015, aligned with Euro NCAP)
Test	Points	%
Overall:	5 /5 stars	
Adult occupant:	36.1	94%
Child occupant:	43.4	88%
Pedestrian:	25.4	70%
Safety assist:	9.9	76%

ANCAP test results* Audi Q7 all variants (2019, aligned with Euro NCAP)
Test	Points	%
Overall:	5 /5 stars	
Adult occupant:	35.2	92%
Child occupant:	43	87%
Pedestrian:	34.2	71%
Safety assist:	9.2	71%

==== Euro NCAP ====
Euro NCAP test results* Audi Q7 50 TDI quattro S line (LHD) (2019)
Test	Points	%
Overall:	5 /5 stars	
Adult occupant:	35.2	92%
Child occupant:	42.5	86%
Pedestrian:	34.3	71%
Safety assist:	9.5	72%

==== IIHS ====
IIHS scores (2017 model year)
Small overlap front (driver)	Good		
Small overlap front (passenger)	Good		
Moderate overlap front (original test)	Good		
Side (original test)	Good		
Side (updated test)	Good		
Roof strength	Good		
Head restraints and seats	Good		
Headlights	Marginal	Poor	
Front crash prevention: vehicle-to-vehicle	Superior		Standard
Front crash prevention: vehicle-to-vehicle	Superior		Optional
Child seat anchors (LATCH) ease of use	Good+		

== Third generation (Typ G8; 2026) ==
Third generation
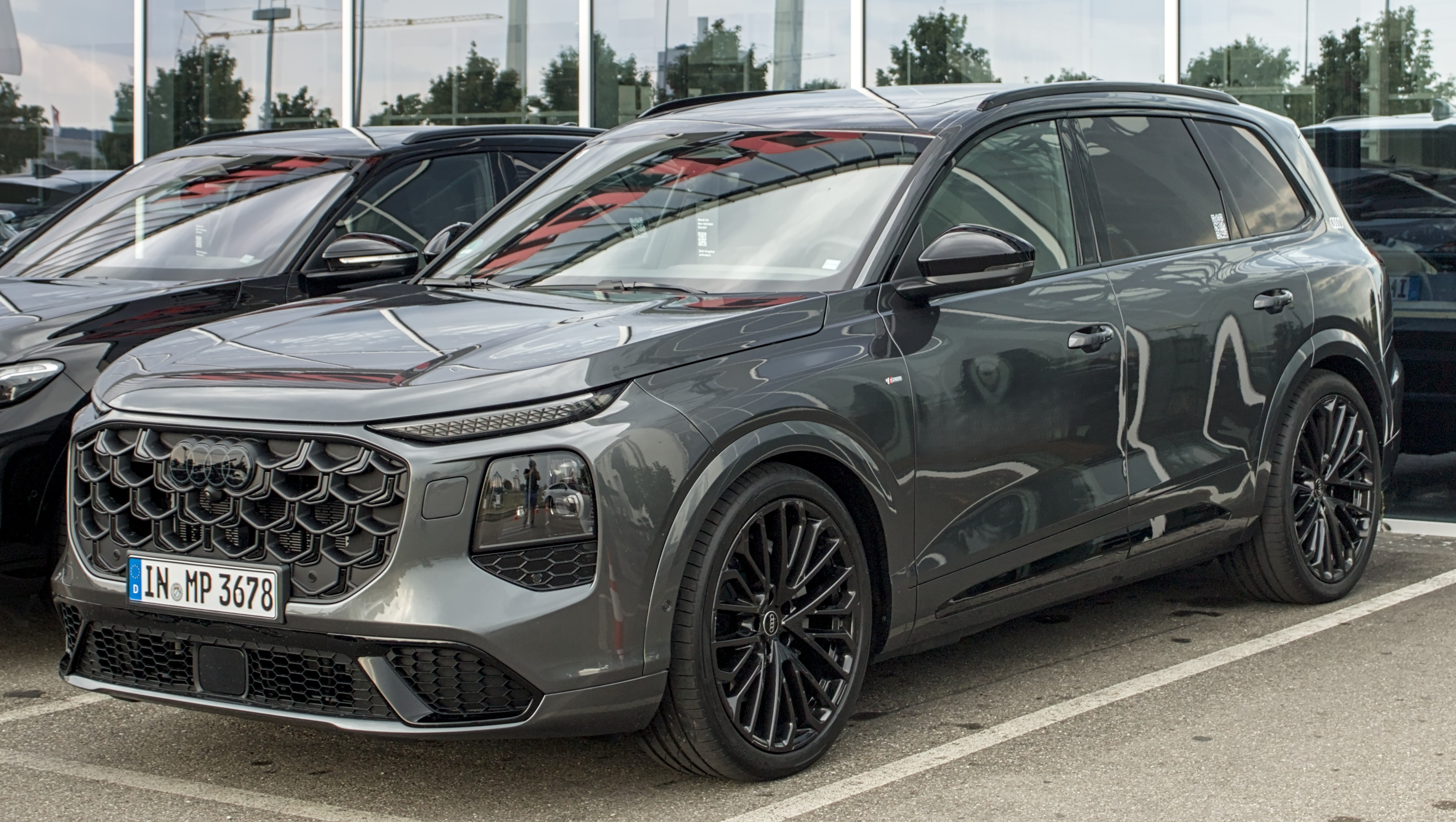

Overview
- Model code: G8
- Production: 2026 (to commence)
- Assembly: Slovakia: Bratislava (Volkswagen Bratislava Plant)

Body and chassis
- Platform: Premium Platform Combustion
- Related: Audi Q9

Powertrain
- Engine: Petrol: 2.9 L TFSI V6; 4.0 L TFSI V8; Diesel: 3.0 L TDI V6
- Transmission: 8-speed automatic

Dimensions
- Wheelbase: 2,995 mm (117.9 in)
- Length: 5,056 mm (199.1 in)
- Width: 2,010 mm (79 in)
- Height: 1,800 mm (71 in)

The third generation Q7 was revealed on 9 June 2026, over 11 years after its predecessor's launch. It is based on the Premium Platform Combustion platform.

The Q7 uses an adaptation of Audi's latest design language, including more curvaceous surfaces, split matrix LED headlights and a rear light bar with optional OLED technology. Wheel sizes range from 20 to 23 inches with six-piston calipers. Lights located at the underside of the vehicle are capable of projecting turn signals on the ground to warn other drivers and pedestrians.

The interior features Audi's Digital Stage display, which includes a 11.9 inch instrument panel, 14.5 inch central display, and a 10.9 inch passenger display. Three seating configurations are available: a two-row five seat option with a rear bench seat, and three-row six or seven seat options with either a rear bench seat or individual captain's chairs. Additional features include magnetic wireless charging pads in the front and a 4D sound system with speakers in the headrest and in-seat actuators. The trunk has a capacity of 670 L (24 cu ft) with the third row folded, expanding to 2,075 L (73 cu ft) when the second row is folded.

It is available with automatic braking, traffic alerts, a 360 degree camera and various parking assistance systems. A new feature allows the vehicle to automatically steer to a safe location if the driver is detected to be "inactive". While it is available with steel springs as standard, various air suspension systems can be chosen, either with magnetic dampers or an S-line exclusive variant with a 30 mm (1 in) lower ground clearance.

In European markets, the Q7 will only be available with diesel TDI powertrains. Both include a 2.9-litre twin-turbo V6 producing either 242 hp (180 kW; 245 PS) and 500 N⋅m (369 lb⋅ft) or 295 hp (220 kW; 299 PS) and 630 N⋅m (465 lb⋅ft) of torque. The engine is assisted by an electric motor producing 24 hp (18 kW; 24 PS), and can be filled with hydrotreated vegetable oil (HVO). It can accelerate from 0-62 mph (100 km/h) within 6.2 seconds and reaches a top speed of 235 km/h (146 mph).

Meanwhile, the SQ7 is powered by a 4.0-litre twin-turbo V8 producing 591 hp (441 kW; 599 PS) and 800 N⋅m (590 lb⋅ft) of torque.

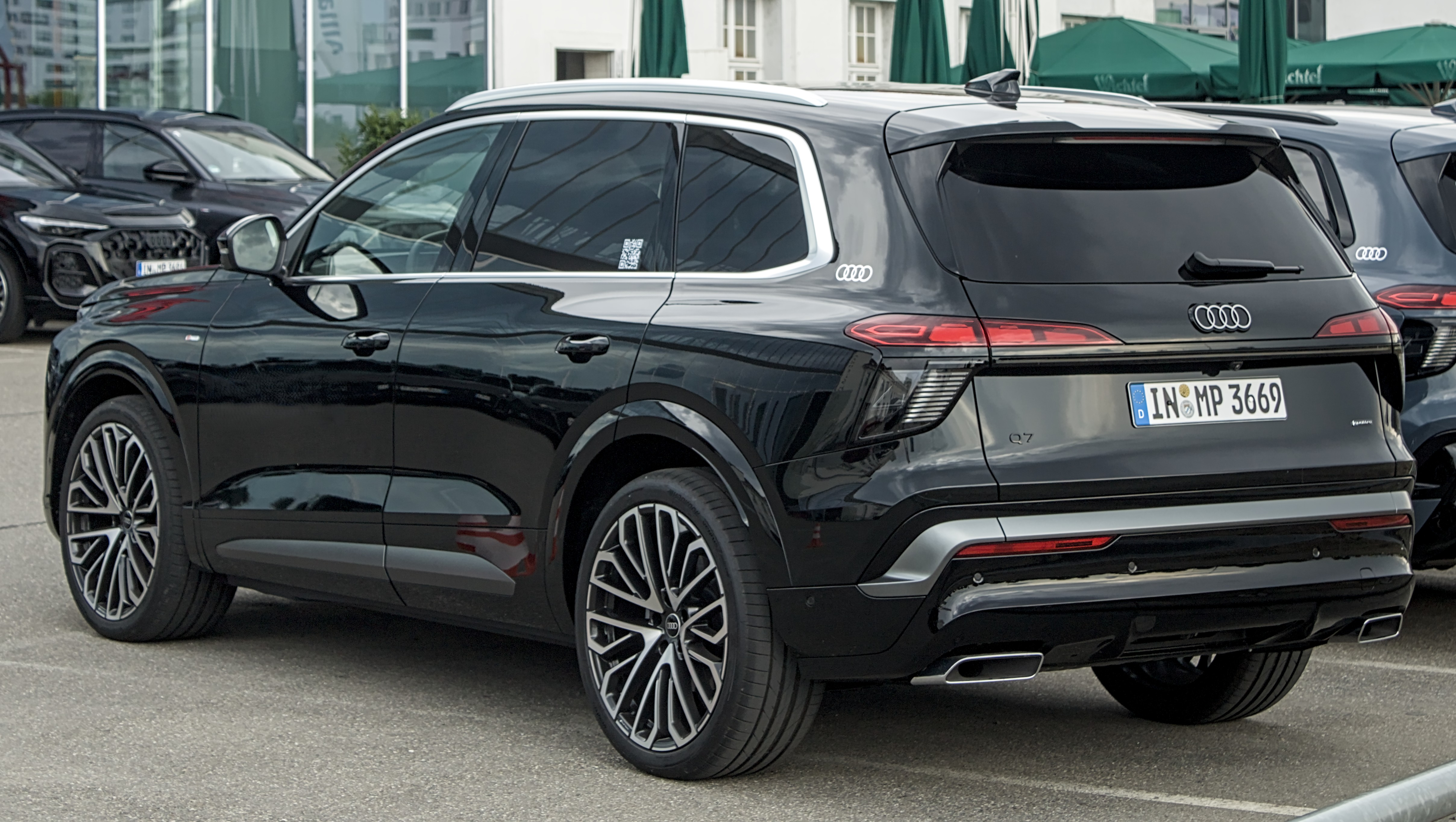
Q7 (rear view)

Interior

=== Safety ===
==== Euro NCAP ====
Euro NCAP test results Audi Q7 (2026)
Test	Score
Overall:	5 /5 stars
Safe driving	77%
Crash avoidance	72%
Crash protection	100%
Post crash	88%

== Sales ==
Year	Europe	U.S.	Canada	China
2005	125	—	—	
2006	33,044	10,003	618	
2007	41,064	20,695	1,235	
2008	30,000	13,209	1,269	
2009	12,616	7,299	1,146	
2010	12,455	7,976	1,247	
2011	12,882	8,998	1,565	
2012	11,513	11,008	1,653	
2013	11,037	15,978	1,781	
2014	10,491	18,517	1,959	
2015	20,698	18,995	1,658	
2016	33,358	30,563	4,335	
2017	30,351	38,346	4,666	
2018	23,213	37,417	4,507	
2019		34,649	3,213	
2020		16,784	1,646	
2021				
2022		19,308		
2023		28,931		17,862
2024		20,894		15,081
2025		18,381		11,979
