= Audi =

German automotive manufacturer

Audi AG

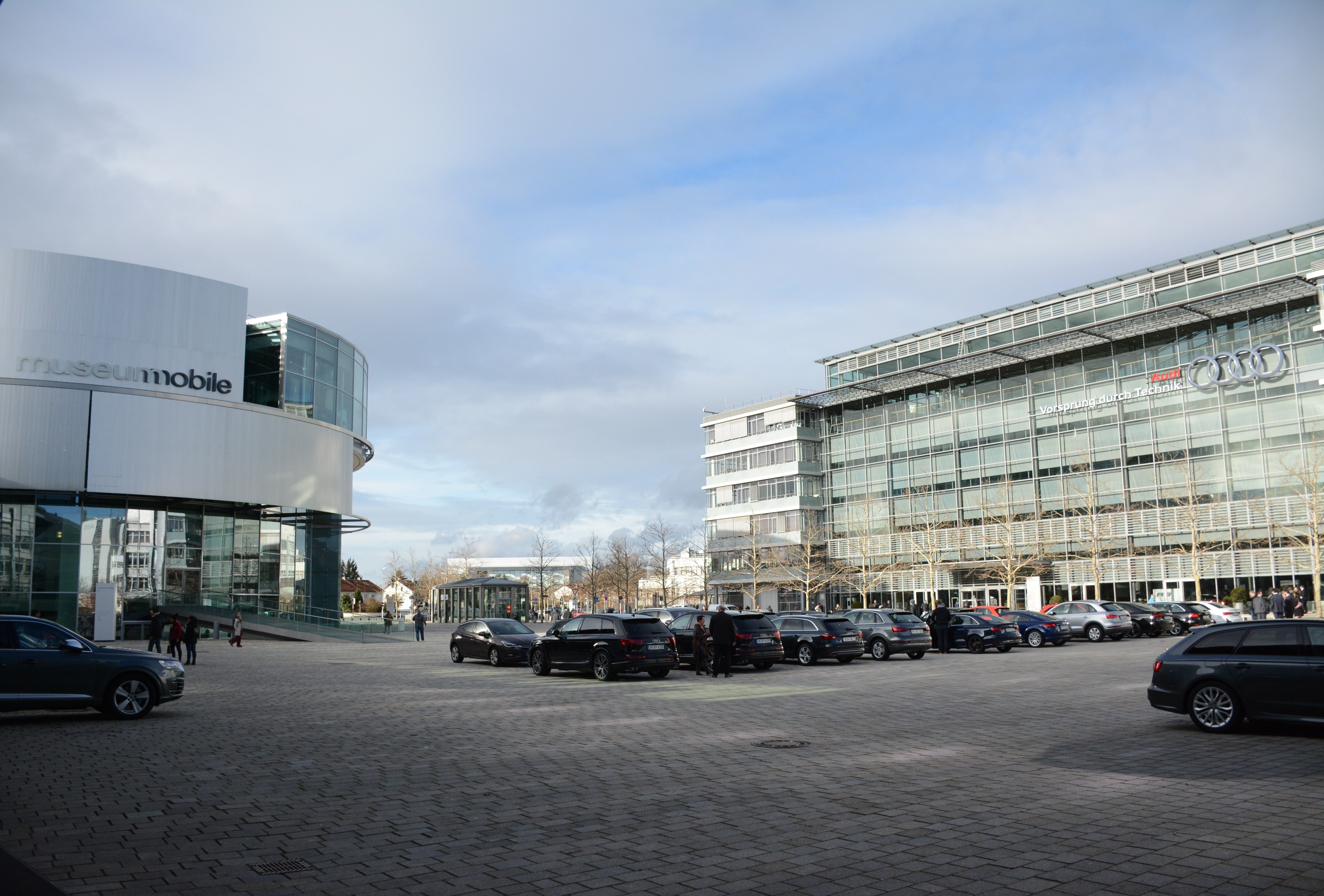
- Audi Forum (Ingolstadt, Bavaria, Germany): museum and headquarters of the carmaker
- Type: Subsidiary
- Industry: Automotive
- Predecessors: Auto Union/DKW GmbH; Slaby-Beringer; Wanderer; NSU Motorenwerke AG
- Founded: 16 July 1909 in Zwickau (Audi); 29 June 1932 in Chemnitz (Auto Union); 3 September 1949 in Ingolstadt (re-establishment); 10 March 1969 in Neckarsulm (Fusion)
- Founder: August Horch
- Headquarters: Ingolstadt, Germany
- Number of locations: 21 production facilities in 12 countries
- Area served: Worldwide
- Key people: Gernot Döllner (chairman of the Board of Management & Board of Management Member for Technical Development and Product Lines)
- Products: Luxury vehicles
- Production output: ▼1,692,548 units
- Revenue: ▼€64.532 billion (2024)
- Operating income: ▼€3.903 billion (2024)
- Net income: ▼€4.189 billion (2024)
- Total assets: ▼€73.097 billion (2024)
- Total equity: ▲€35.882 billion (2024)
- Number of employees: 88,604 (12/2024)
- Parent: Volkswagen Group
- Divisions: Audi Germany; Audi Brussels; Audi Hungaria; Audi Spain; Audi Slovakia; Audi Mexico; Audi do Brasil; Audi China; Audi India
- Subsidiaries: Audi Sport; Automobili Lamborghini; Bentley Motors; Audi Motorsport (70%)
- Website: audi.com
- Footnotes; Audi History: Chronicle, 2011 Annual Financial Report

Audi AG (Note: German: [ˈaʊ̯di ʔaːˈɡeː]) is a German automotive manufacturer of luxury vehicles headquartered in Ingolstadt, Bavaria, Germany. As a wholly owned subsidiary of the Volkswagen Group, Audi produces vehicles in nine production facilities worldwide.

The origins of the company are complex, dating back to the early 20th century and the initial enterprises (Horch and the Audiwerke) founded by engineer August Horch. Two other manufacturers (DKW and Wanderer) also contributed to the foundation of Auto Union in 1932. The modern Audi era began in the 1960s, when Auto Union was acquired by Volkswagen from Daimler-Benz. Volkswagen relaunched the Audi brand with the 1965 introduction of the Audi F103 series, and merged Auto Union with NSU Motorenwerke in 1969, thus creating the present-day form of the company.

The company name is based on the Latin translation of the surname of the founder, August Horch. Horch, meaning 'listen, hark' in German, translates to audi in Latin. The four rings of the Audi logo each represent one of four car companies that banded together to create Audi's predecessor company, Auto Union. Audi's slogan is Vorsprung durch Technik, which is translated as 'Progress through Technology'. Audi became a sister to Dr. Ing. h.c. F. Porsche AG (more commonly known as Porsche AG) following Volkswagen Group's 100% acquisition of the latter in 2012, and along with German brands BMW and Mercedes-Benz, is among the best-selling luxury automobile brands in the world.

== History ==
=== Birth of the company and its name ===
Automobile company Wanderer was originally established in 1885, later becoming a branch of Audi AG. Another company, NSU, which also later merged into Audi, was founded during this time, and later supplied the chassis for Gottlieb Daimler's four-wheeler.

On 14 November 1899, August Horch (1868–1951) established the company A. Horch & Cie. in the Ehrenfeld district of Cologne. In 1902, he moved with his company to Reichenbach im Vogtland. On 10 May 1904, he founded the August Horch & Cie. Motorwagenwerke AG, a joint-stock company in Zwickau (State of Saxony).

After troubles with the Horch chief financial officer, August Horch left Motorwagenwerke and founded in Zwickau on 16 July 1909, his second company, the August Horch Automobilwerke GmbH. His former partners sued him for trademark infringement. The German Reichsgericht (Supreme Court) in Leipzig eventually determined that the Horch brand belonged to his former company.

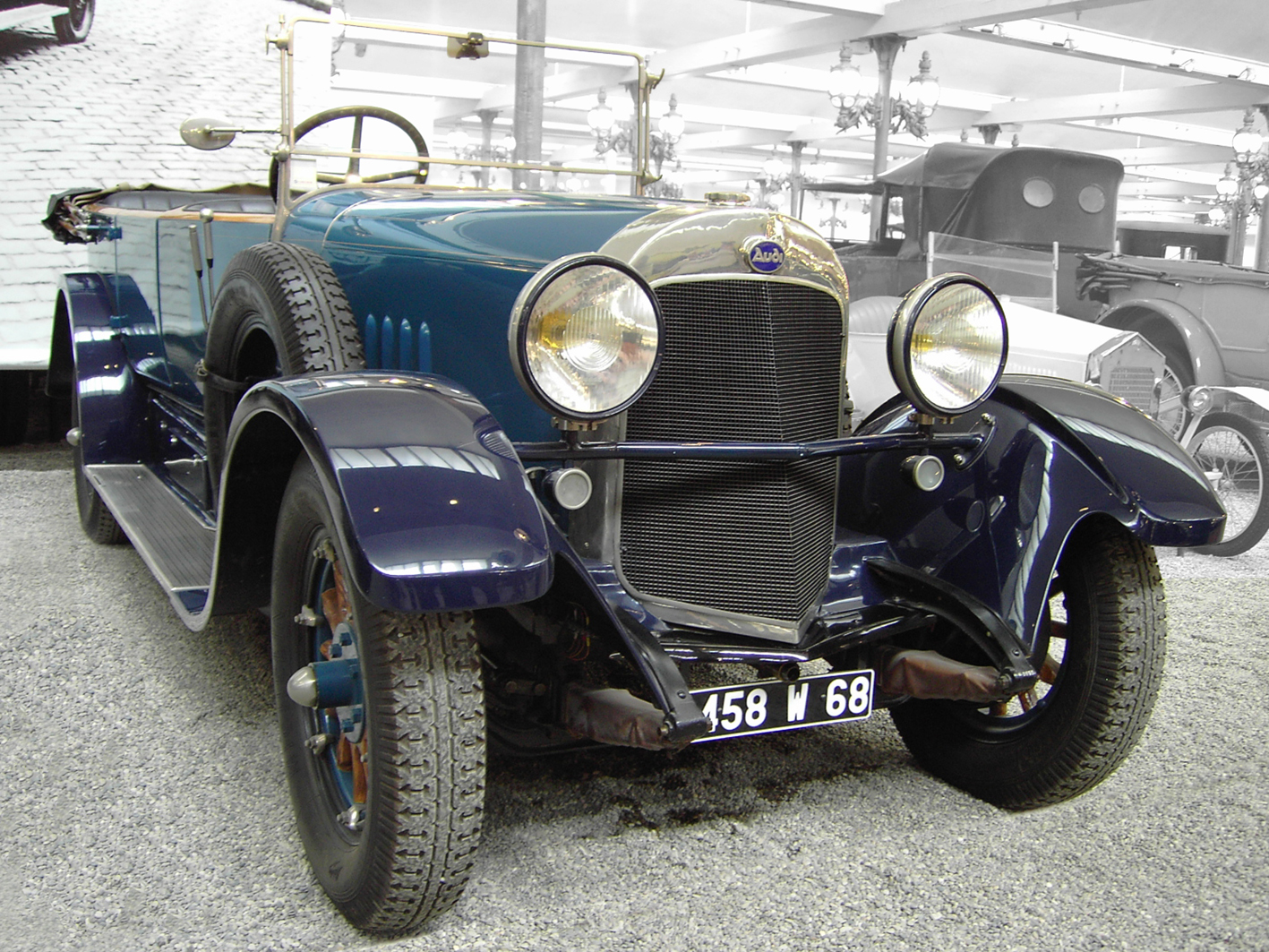
1923 Audi Type E

Since August Horch was prohibited from using horch as a trade name in his new car business, he called a meeting with close business friends, Paul and Franz Fikentscher from Zwickau. At the apartment of Franz Fikentscher, they discussed how to come up with a new name for the company. During this meeting, Franz's son was quietly studying Latin in a corner of the room. Several times he looked like he was on the verge of saying something but would just swallow his words and continue working, until he finally blurted out, "Father – audiatur et altera pars... wouldn't it be a good idea to call it audi instead of horch?". Horch in German means 'hark' or 'hear', which is audi in the singular imperative form of audire—'to listen'—in Latin. The idea was enthusiastically accepted by everyone attending the meeting. On 25 April 1910 the Audi Automobilwerke GmbH Zwickau (from 1915 on Audiwerke AG Zwickau) was entered in the company's register of Zwickau registration court.

The first Audi automobile, the Audi Type A 10/22 hp (16 kW) Sport-Phaeton, was produced in the same year, followed by the successor Type B 10/28PS in the same year.

Audi started with a 2,612 cc straight-four engine model Type A, followed by a 3,564 cc model, as well as 4,680 cc and 5,720 cc models. These cars were successful even in sporting events. The first six-cylinder model Type M, 4,655 cc appeared in 1924.

August Horch left the Audiwerke in 1920 for a high position at the ministry of transport, but he was still involved with Audi as a member of the board of trustees. In September 1921, Audi became the first German car manufacturer to present a production car, the Audi Type K, with left-handed drive. Left-hand drive spread and established dominance during the 1920s because it provided a better view of oncoming traffic, making overtaking safer when driving on the right.

=== The merger of the four companies under the logo of four rings ===
In August 1928, Jørgen Rasmussen, the owner of Dampf-Kraft-Wagen (DKW), acquired the majority of shares in Audiwerke AG. In the same year, Rasmussen bought the remains of the U.S. automobile manufacturer Rickenbacker, including the manufacturing equipment for 8-cylinder engines. These engines were used in Audi Zwickau and Audi Dresden models that were launched in 1929. At the same time, 6-cylinder and 4-cylinder (the "four" with a Peugeot engine) models were manufactured. Audi cars of that era were luxurious cars equipped with special bodywork.

In 1932, Audi merged with Horch, DKW, and Wanderer, to form Auto Union AG, Chemnitz. It was during this period that the company offered the Audi Front that became the first European car to combine a six-cylinder engine with front-wheel drive. It used a power train shared with the Wanderer, but turned 180 degrees, so that the drive shaft faced the front.

Before World War II, Auto Union used the four interlinked rings that make up the Audi badge today, referring to Audi's history as Auto Union and its present day, the four letters for A, U, D and I. However, this badge was used only on Auto Union racing cars in that period while the member companies used their own names and emblems. The technological development became more and more concentrated and some Audi models were propelled by Horch- or Wanderer-built engines.

Reflecting the economic pressures of the time, Auto Union concentrated increasingly on smaller cars through the 1930s, so that by 1938 the company's DKW brand accounted for 17.9% of the German car market, while Audi held only 0.1%. After the final few Audis were delivered in 1939 the "Audi" name disappeared completely from the new car market for more than two decades.

=== World War II ===
Richard Bruhn, a Nazi party member, was Auto Union's chairman of the board from 1932 to 1945 and then again after the war when the company was reestablished. In 2014 Audi became the last major German car company, after Volkswagen, BMW and Daimler, to commission a study of its wartime activities. The investigation found that the company worked with the SS to build seven labor camps where more than 3,700 prisoners were put to work for Auto Union. In addition, 16,500 more people were forced to work at the company's factories in Zwickau and Chemnitz, and another 18,000 at an underground plant in Bavaria where 4,500 people died.

Some of the company's factories were bombed by the Allies.

=== Post-World War II ===
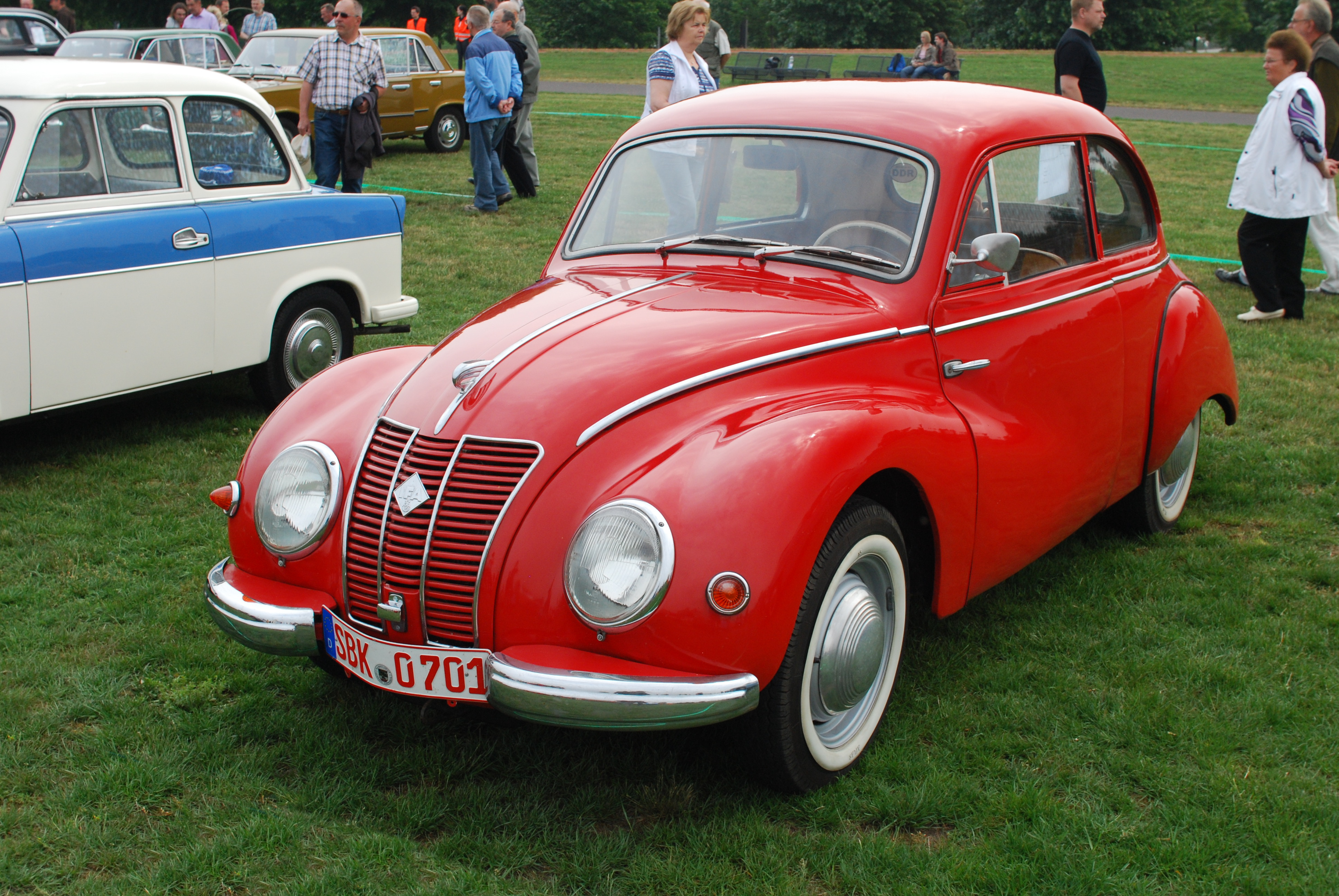
IFA F9

With no prospect of continuing production in Soviet-controlled East Germany, Auto Union executives began the process of relocating what was left of the company to West Germany. A site was chosen in Ingolstadt, Bavaria, to start a spare parts operation in late 1945, which would eventually serve as the headquarters of the reformed Auto Union in 1949.

On 17 August 1948, Auto Union AG of Chemnitz was deleted from the commercial register. These actions had the effect of liquidating Germany's Auto Union AG. The remains of the Audi plant of Zwickau became the VEB (for "People Owned Enterprise") Automobilwerk Zwickau or AWZ (in English: Automobile Works Zwickau).

The former Audi factory in Zwickau restarted assembly of the pre-war models in 1949. These DKW models were renamed to IFA F8 and IFA F9 and were similar to the West German versions. West and East German models were equipped with the traditional and renowned DKW two-stroke engines. The Zwickau plant later manufactured the infamous Trabant until 1991, after it was acquired by the Volkswagen Group following the reunification of Germany, and has since been substantially rebuilt. In 2021, production of the Audi Q4 e-tron began at the plant, marking the return of Audis being manufactured at Zwickau after over 80 years.

=== New Auto Union unit ===
A new West German headquartered Auto Union was launched in Ingolstadt with loans from the Bavarian state government and Marshall Plan aid. The reformed company was launched 3 September 1949 and continued DKW's tradition of producing front-wheel drive vehicles with two-stroke engines. This included production of a small but sturdy 125 cc motorcycle, the DKW RT 125 W and a DKW delivery van, the DKW F89 L at Ingolstadt. The Ingolstadt site was large, consisting of an extensive complex of formerly military buildings which was suitable for administration as well as vehicle warehousing and distribution, but at this stage there was at Ingolstadt no dedicated plant suitable for mass production of automobiles: for manufacturing the company's first post-war mass-market passenger car plant capacity in Düsseldorf was rented from Rheinmetall-Borsig. It was only ten years later, after the company had attracted an investor, when funds became available for construction of major car plant at the Ingolstadt head office site.

In 1958, in response to pressure from Friedrich Flick, then the company's largest single shareholder, Daimler-Benz took an 87% holding in the Auto Union company, and this was increased to a 100% holding in 1959. However, small two-stroke cars were not the focus of Daimler-Benz's interests, and while the early 1960s saw major investment in new Mercedes models and in a state of the art factory for Auto Union's, the company's aging model range at this time did not benefit from the economic boom of the early 1960s to the same extent as competitor manufacturers such as Volkswagen and Opel. The decision to dispose of the Auto Union business was based on its lack of profitability. Ironically, by the time it sold the business, it also included a large new factory and near production-ready modern four-stroke engine, which would enable the Auto Union business, under a new owner, to embark on a period of profitable growth, now producing not Auto Unions or DKWs, but using the "Audi" name, resurrected in 1965 after a 25-year gap.

In 1964, Volkswagen acquired a 50% holding in the business, which included the new factory in Ingolstadt, the DKW and Audi brands along with the rights to the new engine design which had been funded by Daimler-Benz, who in return retained the dormant Horch trademark and the Düsseldorf factory which became a Mercedes-Benz van assembly plant. Eighteen months later, Volkswagen bought complete control of Ingolstadt, and by 1966 were using the spare capacity of the Ingolstadt plant to assemble an additional 60,000 Volkswagen Beetles per year. Two-stroke engines became less popular during the 1960s as customers were more attracted to the smoother four-stroke engines. In September 1965, the DKW F102 was fitted with a four-stroke engine and a facelift for the car's front and rear. Volkswagen dumped the DKW brand because of its associations with two-stroke technology, and having classified the model internally as the F103, sold it simply as the "Audi". Later developments of the model were named after their horsepower ratings and sold as the Audi 60, 75, 80, and Super 90, selling until 1972. Initially, Volkswagen was hostile to the idea of Auto Union as a standalone entity producing its own models having acquired the company merely to boost its own production capacity through the Ingolstadt assembly plant—to the point where Volkswagen executives ordered that the Auto Union name and flags bearing the four rings were removed from the factory buildings. Then VW chief Heinz Nordhoff explicitly forbade Auto Union from any further product development. Fearing that Volkswagen had no long-term ambition for the Audi brand, Auto Union engineers under the leadership of Ludwig Kraus developed the first Audi 100 in secret, without Nordhoff's knowledge. When presented with a finished prototype, Nordhoff was so impressed he authorised the car for production, which when launched in 1968, went on to be a huge success. With this, the resurrection of the Audi brand was now complete, this being followed by the first generation Audi 80 in 1972, which would in turn provide a template for VW's new front-wheel-drive water-cooled range which debuted from the mid-1970s onward.

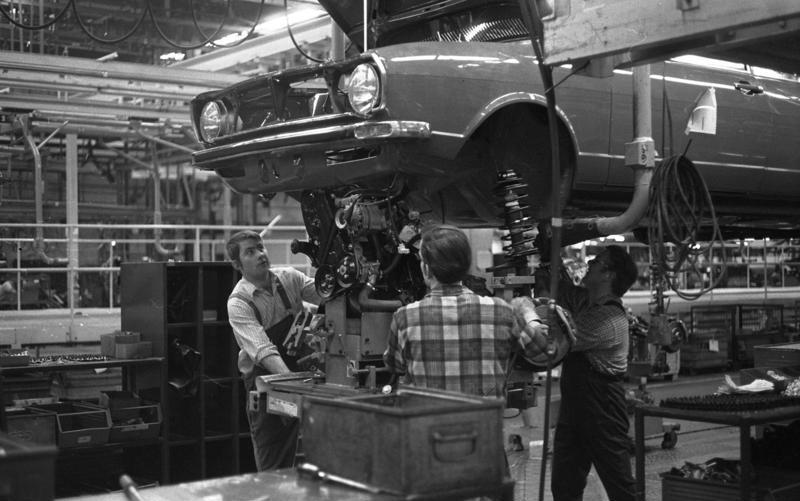
Audi 80 assembly line in Wolfsburg, 1973

In 1969, Auto Union merged with NSU, based in Neckarsulm, near Stuttgart. In the 1950s, NSU had been the world's largest manufacturer of motorcycles, but had moved on to produce small cars like the NSU Prinz, the TT and TTS versions of which are still popular as vintage race cars. NSU then focused on new rotary engines based on the ideas of Felix Wankel. In 1967, the new NSU Ro 80 was a car well ahead of its time in technical details such as aerodynamics, light weight, and safety. However, teething problems with the rotary engines put an end to the independence of NSU. The Neckarsulm plant is now used to produce the larger Audi models A6 and A8. The Neckarsulm factory is also home of the "quattro GmbH" (from November 2016 "Audi Sport GmbH"), a subsidiary responsible for development and production of Audi high-performance models: the R8 and the RS model range.

=== Modern era ===
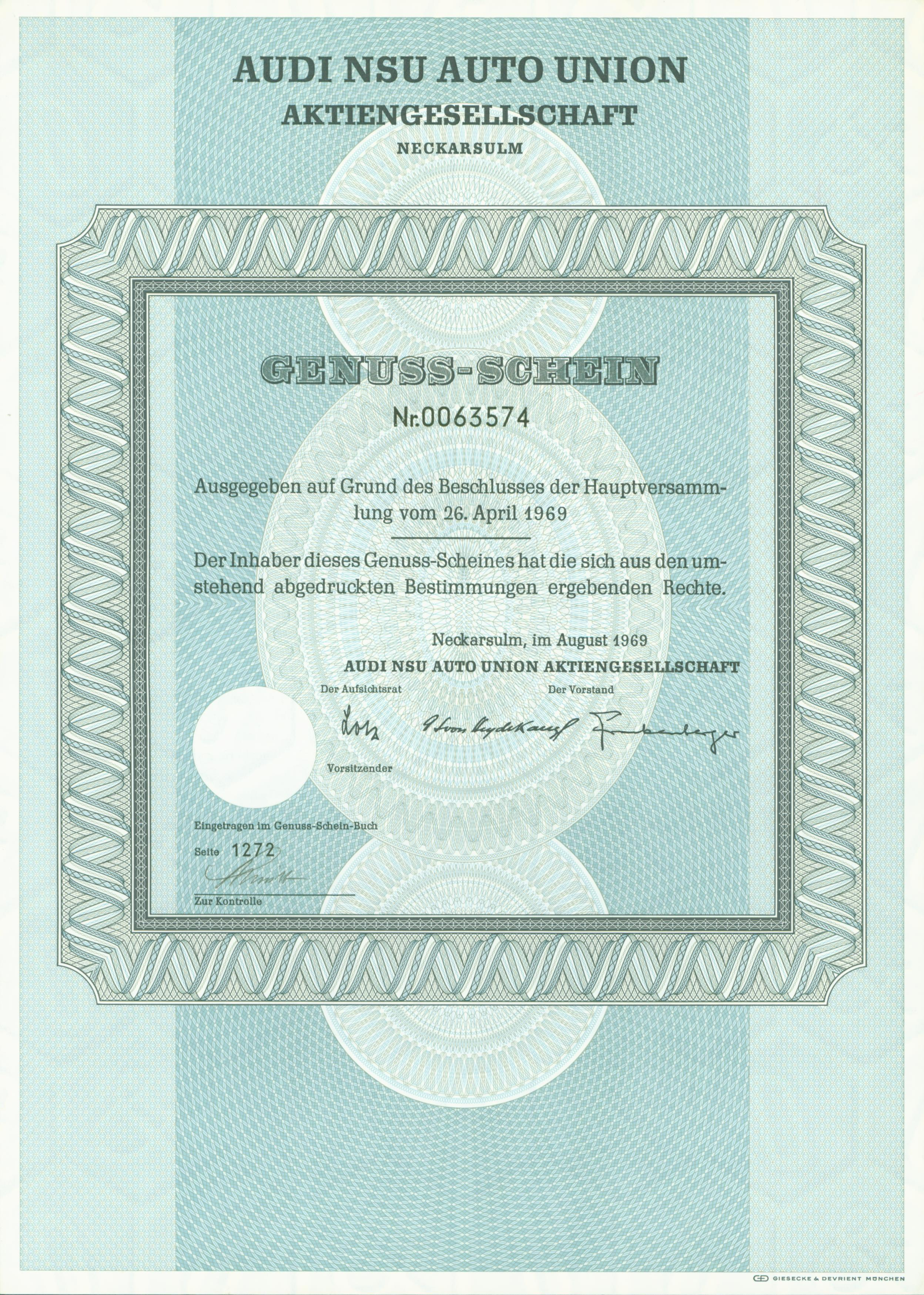
Participation certificate of the Audi NSU Auto Union AG, issued August 1969

The new merged company was incorporated on 1 January 1969 and was known as Audi NSU Auto Union AG, with its headquarters at NSU's Neckarsulm plant, and saw the emergence of Audi as a separate brand for the first time since the pre-war era. Volkswagen introduced the Audi brand to the United States for the 1970 model year. That same year, the mid-sized car that NSU had been working on, the K70, originally intended to slot between the rear-engined Prinz models and the futuristic NSU Ro 80, was instead launched as a Volkswagen.

After the launch of the Audi 100 of 1968, the Audi 80/Fox (which formed the basis for the 1973 Volkswagen Passat) followed in 1972 and the Audi 50 (later rebadged as the Volkswagen Polo) in 1974. The Audi 50 was a seminal design because it was the first incarnation of the Golf/Polo concept, one that led to a hugely successful world car. Ultimately, the Audi 80 and 100 (progenitors of the A4 and A6, respectively) became the company's biggest sellers, whilst little investment was made in the fading NSU range; the Prinz models were dropped in 1973 whilst the fatally flawed NSU Ro80 went out of production in 1977, spelling the effective end of the NSU brand. Production of the Audi 100 had been steadily moved from Ingolstadt to Neckarsulm as the 1970s had progressed, and by the appearance of the second generation C2 version in 1976, all production was now at the former NSU plant. Neckarsulm from that point onward would produce Audi's higher-end models.

The Audi image at this time was a conservative one, and so, a proposal from chassis engineer Jörg Bensinger was accepted to develop the four-wheel drive technology in Volkswagen's Iltis military vehicle for an Audi performance car and rally racing car. The performance car, introduced in 1980, was named the "Audi Quattro", a turbocharged coupé which was also the first German large-scale production vehicle to feature permanent all-wheel drive through a centre differential. Commonly referred to as the "Ur-Quattro" (the "Ur-" prefix is a German augmentative used, in this case, to mean 'original' and is also applied to the first generation of Audi's S4 and S6 Sport Saloons, as in "UrS4" and "UrS6"), few of these vehicles were produced (all hand-built by a single team), but the model was a great success in rallying. Prominent wins proved the viability of all-wheel-drive racecars, and the Audi name became associated with advances in automotive technology.

In 1985, with the Auto Union and NSU brands effectively dead, the company's official name was now shortened to simply Audi AG. At the same time the company's headquarters moved back to Ingolstadt and two new wholly owned subsidiaries; Auto Union GmbH and NSU GmbH, were formed to own and manage the historical trademarks and intellectual property of the original constituent companies (the exception being Horch, which had been retained by Daimler-Benz after the VW takeover), and to operate Audi's heritage operations.

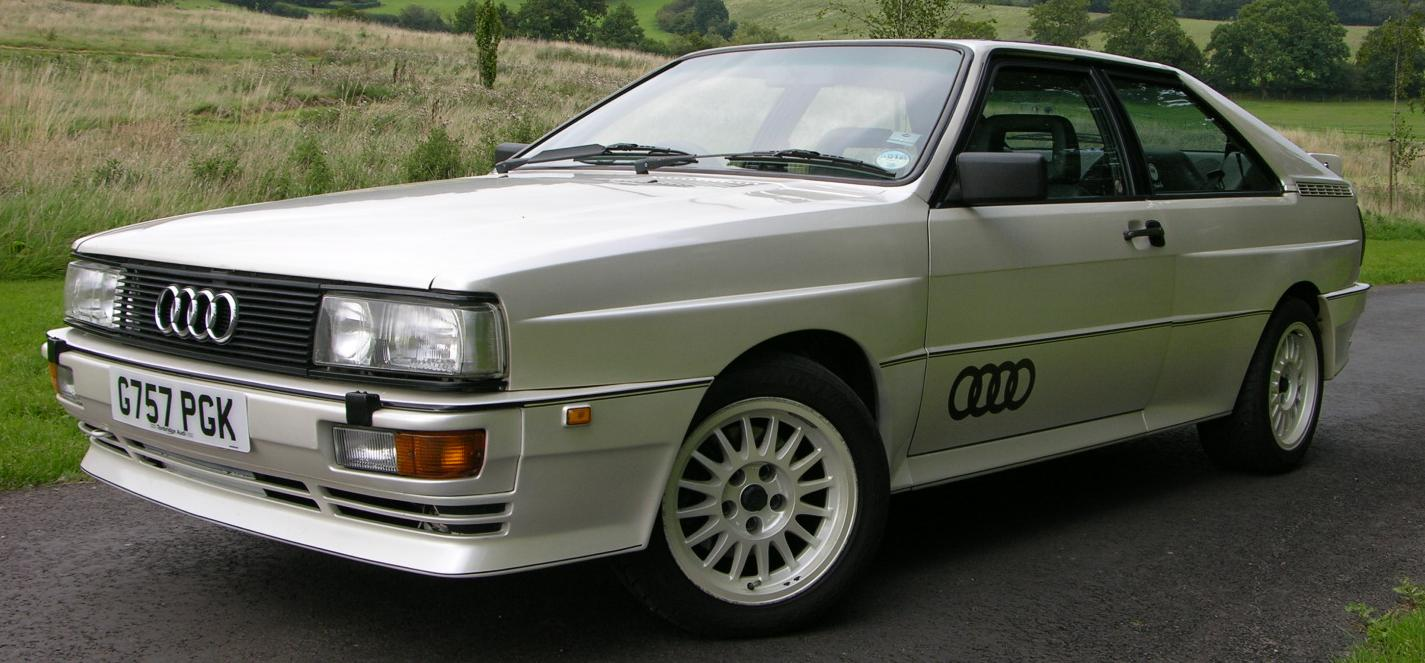
Audi Quattro

In 1986, as the Passat-based Audi 80 was beginning to develop a kind of "grandfather's car" image, the type 89 was introduced. This completely new development sold extremely well. However, its modern and dynamic exterior belied the low performance of its base engine, and its base package was quite spartan (even the passenger-side mirror was an option). In 1987, Audi put forward a new and very elegant Audi 90, which had a much superior set of standard features. In the early 1990s, sales began to slump for the Audi 80 series, and some basic construction problems started to surface.

Through the early 1990s, Audi began to shift its target market upscale to compete against German automakers Mercedes-Benz and BMW. This began with the release of the Audi V8 in 1990. It was essentially a new engine fitted to the Audi 100/200, but with noticeable bodywork differences. Most obvious was the new grille that was now incorporated in the bonnet.

By 1991, Audi had the four-cylinder Audi 80, the 5-cylinder Audi 90 and Audi 100, the turbocharged Audi 200 and the Audi V8. There was also a coupé version of the 80/90 with both four- and five-cylinder engines.

Although the five-cylinder engine was a successful and robust powerplant, it was still a little too different for the target market. With the introduction of an all-new Audi 100 in 1992, Audi introduced a 2.8L V6 engine. This engine was also fitted to a face-lifted Audi 80 (all 80 and 90 models were now badged 80 except for the USA), giving this model a choice of four-, five-, and six-cylinder engines, in saloon, coupé and convertible body styles.

The five-cylinder was soon dropped as a major engine choice; however, a turbocharged 220 PS (162 kW; 217 hp) version remained. The engine, initially fitted to the 200 quattro 20V of 1991, was a derivative of the engine fitted to the Sport Quattro. It was fitted to the Audi Coupé, named the S2, and also to the Audi 100 body, and named the S4. These two models were the beginning of the mass-produced S series of performance cars.

=== Audi 5000 unintended acceleration allegations ===
Sales in the United States fell after a series of recalls from 1982 to 1987 of Audi 5000 models associated with reported incidents of sudden unintended acceleration linked to six deaths and 700 accidents. At the time, NHTSA was investigating 50 car models from 20 manufacturers for sudden surges of power.

A 60 Minutes report aired 23 November 1986, featuring interviews with six people who had sued Audi after reporting unintended acceleration, showing an Audi 5000 ostensibly suffering a problem when the brake pedal was pushed. Subsequent investigation revealed that 60 Minutes had engineered the failure—fitting a canister of compressed air on the passenger-side floor, linked via a hose to a hole drilled into the transmission.

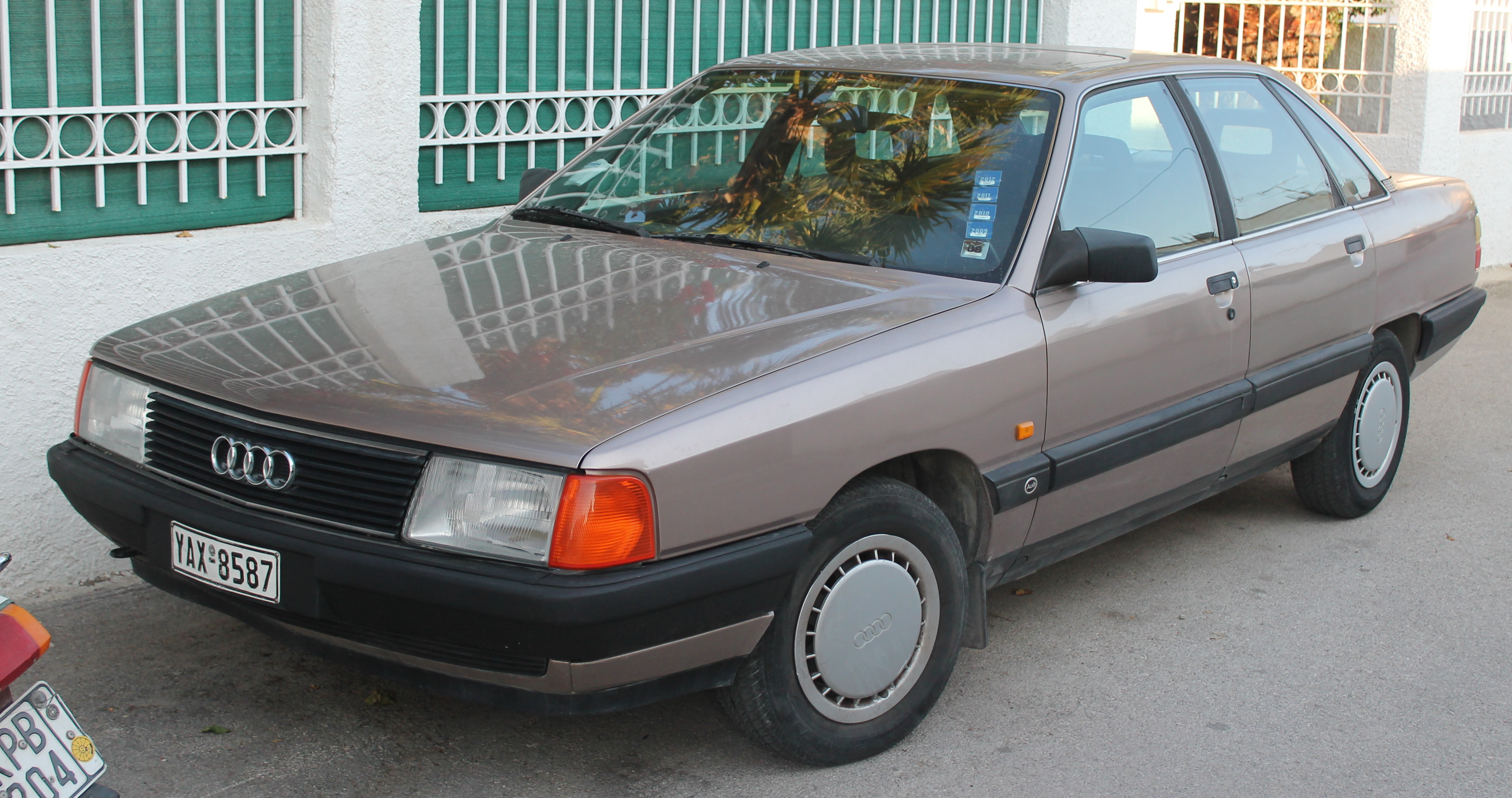
Audi 100 C3, sold as the Audi 5000 in the U.S.

Audi contended, prior to findings by outside investigators, that the problems were caused by driver error, specifically pedal misapplication. Subsequently, the National Highway Traffic Safety Administration (NHTSA) concluded that the majority of unintended acceleration cases, including all the ones that prompted the 60 Minutes report, were caused by driver error such as confusion of pedals. CBS did not acknowledge the test results of involved government agencies, but did acknowledge the similar results of another study.

In a review study published in 2012, NHTSA summarized its past findings about the Audi unintended acceleration problems: "Once an unintended acceleration had begun, in the Audi 5000, due to a failure in the idle-stabilizer system (producing an initial acceleration of 0.3g), pedal misapplication resulting from panic, confusion, or unfamiliarity with the Audi 5000 contributed to the severity of the incident."

This summary is consistent with the conclusions of NHTSA's most technical analysis at the time: "Audi idle-stabilization systems were prone to defects which resulted in excessive idle speeds and brief unanticipated accelerations of up to 0.3g [which is similar in magnitude to an emergency stop in a subway car]. These accelerations could not be the sole cause of [(long-duration) sudden acceleration incidents (SAI)], but might have triggered some SAIs by startling the driver. The defective idle-stabilization system performed a type of electronic throttle control. Significantly: multiple "intermittent malfunctions of the electronic control unit were observed and recorded ... and [were also observed and] reported by Transport Canada."

With a series of recall campaigns, Audi made several modifications; the first adjusted the distance between the brake and accelerator pedal on automatic-transmission models. Later repairs, of 250,000 cars dating back to 1978, added a device requiring the driver to press the brake pedal before shifting out of park. A legacy of the Audi 5000 and other reported cases of sudden unintended acceleration are intricate gear stick patterns and brake interlock mechanisms to prevent inadvertent shifting into forward or reverse. It is unclear how the defects in the idle-stabilization system were addressed.

Audi's U.S. sales, which had reached 74,061 in 1985, dropped to 12,283 in 1991 and remained level for three years,—with resale values falling dramatically. Audi subsequently offered increased warranty protection and renamed the affected models—with the 5000 becoming the 100 and 200 in 1989—and reached the same sales levels again only by model year 2000.

A 2010 BusinessWeek article—outlining possible parallels between Audi's experience and 2009–2010 Toyota vehicle recalls—noted a class-action lawsuit filed in 1987 by about 7,500 Audi 5000-model owners remains unsettled and remains contested in Chicago's Cook County after appeals at the Illinois state and U.S. federal levels.

=== Model introductions ===
In the mid-to-late 1990s, Audi introduced new technologies including the use of aluminium construction. Produced from 1999 to 2005, the Audi A2 was a futuristic super mini, born from the Al2 concept, with many features that helped regain consumer confidence, like the aluminium space frame, which was a first in production car design. In the A2 Audi further expanded their TDI technology through the use of frugal three-cylinder engines. The A2 was extremely aerodynamic and was designed around a wind tunnel. The Audi A2 was criticised for its high price and was never really a sales success but it planted Audi as a cutting-edge manufacturer. The model, a Mercedes-Benz A-Class competitor, sold relatively well in Europe. However, the A2 was discontinued in 2005 and Audi decided not to develop an immediate replacement.

The next major model change came in 1995 when the Audi A4 replaced the Audi 80. The new nomenclature scheme was applied to the Audi 100 to become the Audi A6 (with a minor facelift). This also meant the S4 became the S6 and a new S4 was introduced in the A4 body. The S2 was discontinued. The Audi Cabriolet continued on (based on the Audi 80 platform) until 1999, gaining the engine upgrades along the way. A new A3 hatchback model (sharing the Volkswagen Golf Mk4's platform) was introduced to the range in 1996, and the radical Audi TT coupé and roadster were debuted in 1998 based on the same underpinnings.

The petrol engines available throughout the range were now a 1.4 L, 1.6 L and 1.8 L four-cylinder, 1.8 L four-cylinder turbo, 2.6 L and 2.8 L V6, 2.2 L turbo-charged five-cylinder and the 4.2 L V8 engine. The V6s were replaced by new 2.4 L and 2.8 L 30V V6s in 1998, with marked improvement in power, torque and smoothness. Further engines were added along the way, including a 3.7 L V8 and 6.0 L W12 engine for the A8.

=== Audi AG today ===
Audi's sales grew strongly in the 2000s, with deliveries to customers increasing from 653,000 in 2000 to 1,003,000 in 2008. The largest sales increases came from Eastern Europe (+19.3%), Africa (+17.2%) and the Middle East (+58.5%). China in particular has become a key market, representing 108,000 out of 705,000 cars delivered in the first three quarters of 2009. One factor for its popularity in China is that Audis have become the car of choice for purchase by the Chinese government for officials, and purchases by the government are responsible for 20% of its sales in China. As of late 2009, Audi's operating profit of €1.17 billion ($1.85 billion) made it the biggest contributor to parent Volkswagen Group's nine-month operating profit of €1.5 billion, while the other marques in Group such as Bentley and SEAT had suffered considerable losses. May 2011 saw record sales for Audi of America with the new Audi A7 and Audi A3 TDI Clean Diesel. In May 2012, Audi reported a 10% increase in its sales—from 408 units to 480 in the last year alone.

Audi manufactures vehicles in seven plants around the world, some of which are shared with other VW Group marques although many sub-assemblies such as engines and transmissions are manufactured within other Volkswagen Group plants.

Audi's two principal assembly plants in Germany are:

- Ingolstadt, the former Auto Union site originally opened in 1945 and substantially rebuilt by Daimler-Benz in 1962, and acquired by Volkswagen in 1964 (A2 e-tron, A3, Q3, A6 e-tron, Q6 e-tron)
- Neckarsulm, the former NSU plant, acquired by Volkswagen in 1969. Home of Audi Sport GmbH (A5, A6, A8) - a satellite plant at nearby Böllinger Höfe produces the e-tron GT.

Audi also produces vehicles in Germany at:

- Zwickau, the birthplace of Audi. The former Trabant factory, acquired by Volkswagen in 1990 to form Volkswagen Sachsen (Q4 e-tron)

Outside of Germany, Audi produces vehicles at:

- Anting, China. A joint venture with SAIC
- Aurangabad, India. Škoda Auto Volkswagen India factory
- Bratislava, Slovakia. Volkswagen Slovakia factory (Q7, Q8 and Q9)
- Changchun, China. A joint venture with FAW
- Foshan, China. A joint venture with FAW
- Győr, Hungary (Q3)
- Martorell, Spain. A SEAT factory (A1)
- Ningbo, China. A joint venture with SAIC
- Qingdao, China. A joint venture with FAW
- San José Chiapa, Mexico (Q5)
- São José dos Pinhais, Brazil
- Tianjin, China. A joint venture with FAW

In September 2012, Audi announced the construction of its first North American manufacturing plant in Puebla, Mexico. This plant became operative in 2016 and produces the second generation Q5.

From 2002 up to 2003, Audi headed the Audi Brand Group, a subdivision of the Volkswagen Group's Automotive Division consisting of Audi, Lamborghini and SEAT, which was focused on sporty values, with the marques' product vehicles and performance being under the higher responsibility of the Audi brand.

In January 2014, Audi, along with the Wireless Power Consortium, operated a booth which demonstrated a phone compartment using the Qi open interface standard at the Consumer Electronics Show (CES). In May, most of the Audi dealers in the UK falsely claimed that the Audi A7, A8, and R8 were Euro NCAP safety tested, all achieving five out of five stars. In fact none were tested.

In 2015, Audi admitted that at least 2.1 million Audi cars had been involved in the Volkswagen emissions testing scandal in which software installed in the cars manipulated emissions data to fool regulators and allow the cars to pollute at higher than government-mandated levels. The A1, A3, A4, A5, A6, TT, Q3 and Q5 models were implicated in the scandal. Audi promised to quickly find a technical solution and upgrade the cars so they can function within emissions regulations. Ulrich Hackenberg, the head of research and development at Audi, was suspended in relation to the scandal. Despite widespread media coverage about the scandal through the month of September, Audi reported that U.S. sales for the month had increased by 16.2%. Audi's parent company Volkswagen announced on 18 June 2018 that Audi chief executive Rupert Stadler had been arrested.

In November 2015, the U.S. Environmental Protection Agency implicated the 3-liter diesel engine versions of the 2016 Audi A6 Quattro, A7 Quattro, A8, A8L and the Q5 as further models that had emissions regulation defeat-device software installed. Thus, these models emitted nitrogen oxide at up to nine times the legal limit when the car detected that it was not hooked up to emissions testing equipment.

In November 2016, Audi expressed an intention to establish an assembly factory in Pakistan, with the company's local partner acquiring land for a plant in Korangi Creek Industrial Park in Karachi. Approval of the plan would lead to an investment of $30 million in the new plant. Audi planned to cut 9,500 jobs in Germany starting from 2020 till 2025 to fund electric vehicles and digital working.

In February 2020, Volkswagen AG announced that it plans to take over all Audi shares it does not own (totalling 0.36%) via a squeeze-out according to German stock corporation law, thus making Audi a fully owned subsidiary of the Volkswagen Group. This change took effect from 16 November 2020, when Audi became a wholly owned subsidiary of the Volkswagen Group.

In January 2021, Audi announced that it is planning to sell one million vehicles in China in 2023, comparing to 726,000 vehicles in 2020.

In March 2026, the company announced its plan to put the Audi A2 e-tron on sale in 2026 as a small, electric car. The car will follow the shape of the original A2, which was produced from 1999 until 2005.

== Leadership ==
- Wolfgang R. Habbel (1979–1988)
- Ferdinand Piëch (1988–1993)
- Franz-Josef Kortüm (1993–1994)
- Herbert Demel (1994–1998)
- Franz-Josef Paefgen (1998–2002)
- Martin Winterkorn (2002–2006)
- Rupert Stadler (2006–2018) (Arrested in connection with the Volkswagen emissions scandal)
- Abraham Schoot (2018–2020)
- Markus Duesmann (2020–2023)
- Gernot Döllner (2023–present)

== Technology ==
=== Audi AI ===
Audi AI is a driver assist feature offered by Audi. The company's stated intent is to offer fully autonomous driving at a future time, acknowledging that legal, regulatory and technical hurdles must be overcome to achieve this goal. On 4 June 2017, Audi stated that its new A8 will be fully self-driving for speeds up to 60 km/h using its Audi AI. Contrary to other cars, the driver will not have to do safety checks such as touching the steering wheel every 15 seconds to use this feature. The Audi A8 will therefore be the first production car to reach level 3 autonomous driving, meaning that the driver can safely turn their attention away from driving tasks, e.g. the driver can text or watch a movie. Audi will also be the first manufacturer to use a 3D Lidar system in addition to cameras and ultrasonic sensors for its AI.

=== Bodyshells ===
Audi produces 100% galvanised cars to prevent corrosion, and was the first mass-market vehicle to do so, following introduction of the process by Porsche, c. 1975. Along with other precautionary measures, the full-body zinc coating has proved to be very effective in preventing rust. The body's resulting durability even surpassed Audi's own expectations, causing the manufacturer to extend its original 10-year warranty against corrosion perforation to currently 12 years (except for aluminium bodies which do not rust).

=== Space Frame ===
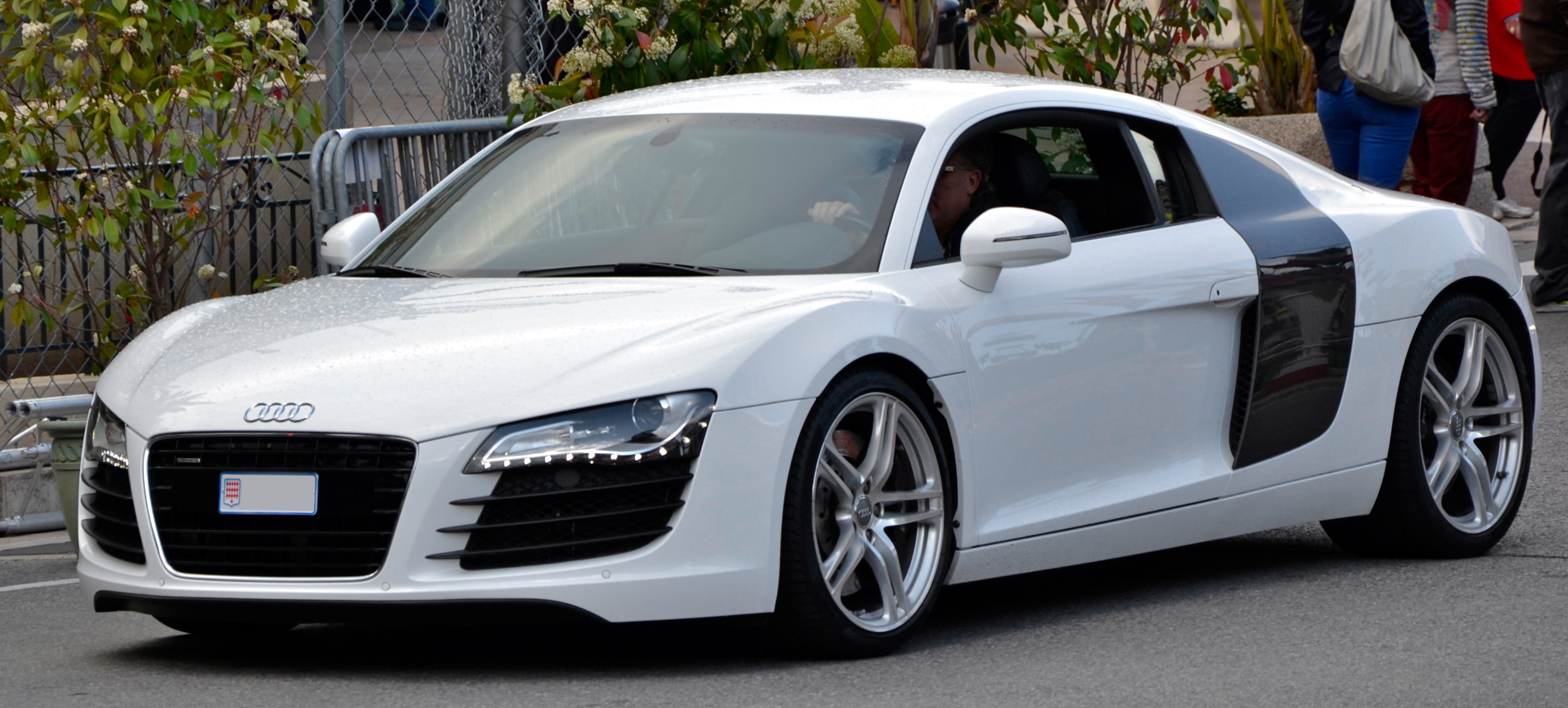
The Audi R8 uses Audi Space Frame technology.

Audi introduced a new series of vehicles in the mid-1990s and continues to pursue new technology and high performance. An all-aluminium car was brought forward by Audi, and in 1994 the Audi A8 was launched, which introduced aluminium space frame technology (called Audi Space Frame or ASF) which saves weight and improves torsion rigidity compared to a conventional steel frame. Prior to that effort, Audi used examples of the Type 44 chassis fabricated out of aluminium as test-beds for the technique. The disadvantage of the aluminium frame is that it is very expensive to repair and requires a specialized aluminium bodyshop. The weight reduction is somewhat offset by the quattro four-wheel drive system which is standard in most markets. Nonetheless, the A8 is usually the lightest all-wheel drive car in the full-size luxury segment, also having best-in-class fuel economy. The Audi A2, Audi TT and Audi R8 also use Audi Space Frame designs.

=== Drivetrains ===
==== Layout ====
For most of its lineup (excluding the A3, A1, and TT models), Audi has not adopted the transverse engine layout which is typically found in economy cars (such as Peugeot and Citroën), since that would limit the type and power of engines that can be installed. To be able to mount powerful engines (such as a V8 engine in the Audi S4 and Audi RS4, as well as the W12 engine in the Audi A8L W12), Audi has usually engineered its more expensive cars with a longitudinally front-mounted engine, in an "overhung" position, over the front wheels in front of the axle line—this layout dates back to the DKW and Auto Union saloons from the 1950s. But while this allows for the easy adoption of all-wheel drive, it goes against the ideal 50:50 weight distribution.

In all its post Volkswagen era models, Audi has firmly refused to adopt the traditional rear-wheel drive layout favored by its two archrivals Mercedes-Benz and BMW, favoring either front-wheel drive or all-wheel drive. The majority of Audi's lineup in the United States features all-wheel drive standard on most of its expensive vehicles (only the entry-level trims of the A4 and A6 are available with front-wheel drive), in contrast to Mercedes-Benz and BMW whose lineup treats all-wheel drive as an option. BMW did not offer all-wheel drive on its V8-powered cars (as opposed to crossover SUVs) until the 2010 BMW 7 Series and 2011 BMW 5 Series, while the Audi A8 has had all-wheel drive available/standard since the 1990s. Regarding high-performance variants, Audi S and RS models have always had all-wheel drive, unlike their direct rivals from BMW M and Mercedes-AMG whose cars are rear-wheel drive only (although their performance crossover SUVs are all-wheel drive).

Audi has recently applied the quattro badge to models such as the A3 and TT which do not use the Torsen-based system as in prior years with a mechanical center differential, but with the Haldex Traction electro-mechanical clutch AWD system.

==== Engines ====
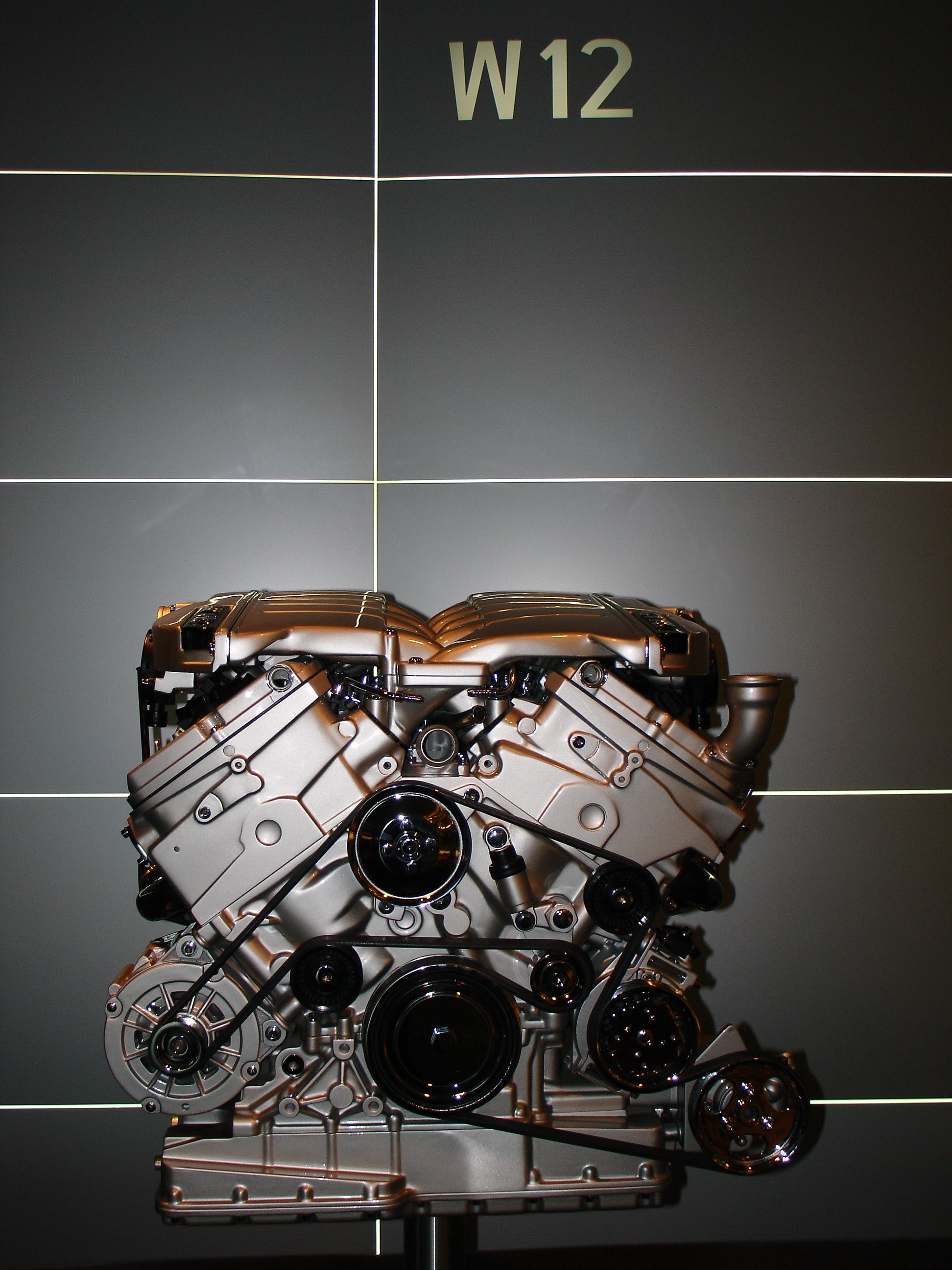
Volkswagen Group W12 engine from the Volkswagen Phaeton W12

Prior to the introduction of the Audi 80 and Audi 50 in 1972 and 1974, respectively, Audi had led the development of the EA111 and EA827 inline-four engine families. These new power units underpinned the water-cooled revival of parent company Volkswagen (in the Polo, Golf, Passat and Scirocco), whilst the many derivatives and descendants of these two basic engine designs have appeared in every generation of VW Group vehicles right up to the present day.

In the 1980s, Audi, along with Volvo, was the champion of the inline-five cylinder, 2.1/2.2 L engine as a longer-lasting alternative to more traditional six-cylinder engines. This engine was used not only in production cars but also in its race cars. The 2.1 L inline five-cylinder engine was used as a base for the rally cars in the 1980s, providing well over 400 horsepower (300 kilowatts) after modification. Before 1990, there were engines produced with a displacement between 2.0 L and 2.3 L. This range of engine capacity allowed for both fuel economy and power.

For the ultra-luxury version of its Audi A8 fullsize luxury flagship sedan, the Audi A8L W12, Audi uses the Volkswagen Group W12 engine instead of the conventional V12 engine favored by rivals Mercedes-Benz and BMW. The W12 engine configuration (also known as a "WR12") is created by forming two imaginary narrow-angle 15° VR6 engines at an angle of 72°, and the narrow angle of each set of cylinders allows just two overhead camshafts to drive each pair of banks, so just four are needed in total. The advantage of the W12 engine is its compact packaging, allowing Audi to build a 12-cylinder sedan with all-wheel drive, whereas a conventional V12 engine could have only a rear-wheel drive configuration as it would have no space in the engine bay for a differential and other components required to power the front wheels. In fact, the 6.0 L W12 in the Audi A8L W12 is smaller in overall dimensions than the 4.2 L V8 that powers the Audi A8 4.2 variants. The 2011 Audi A8 debuted a revised 6.3-litre version of the W12 (WR12) engine with 500 PS (370 kW; 490 hp).

==== Fuel Stratified Injection ====
New models of the A3, A4, A6 and A8 have been introduced, with the ageing 1.8-litre engine now having been replaced by new Fuel Stratified Injection (FSI) engines. Nearly every petroleum burning model in the range now incorporates this fuel-saving technology.

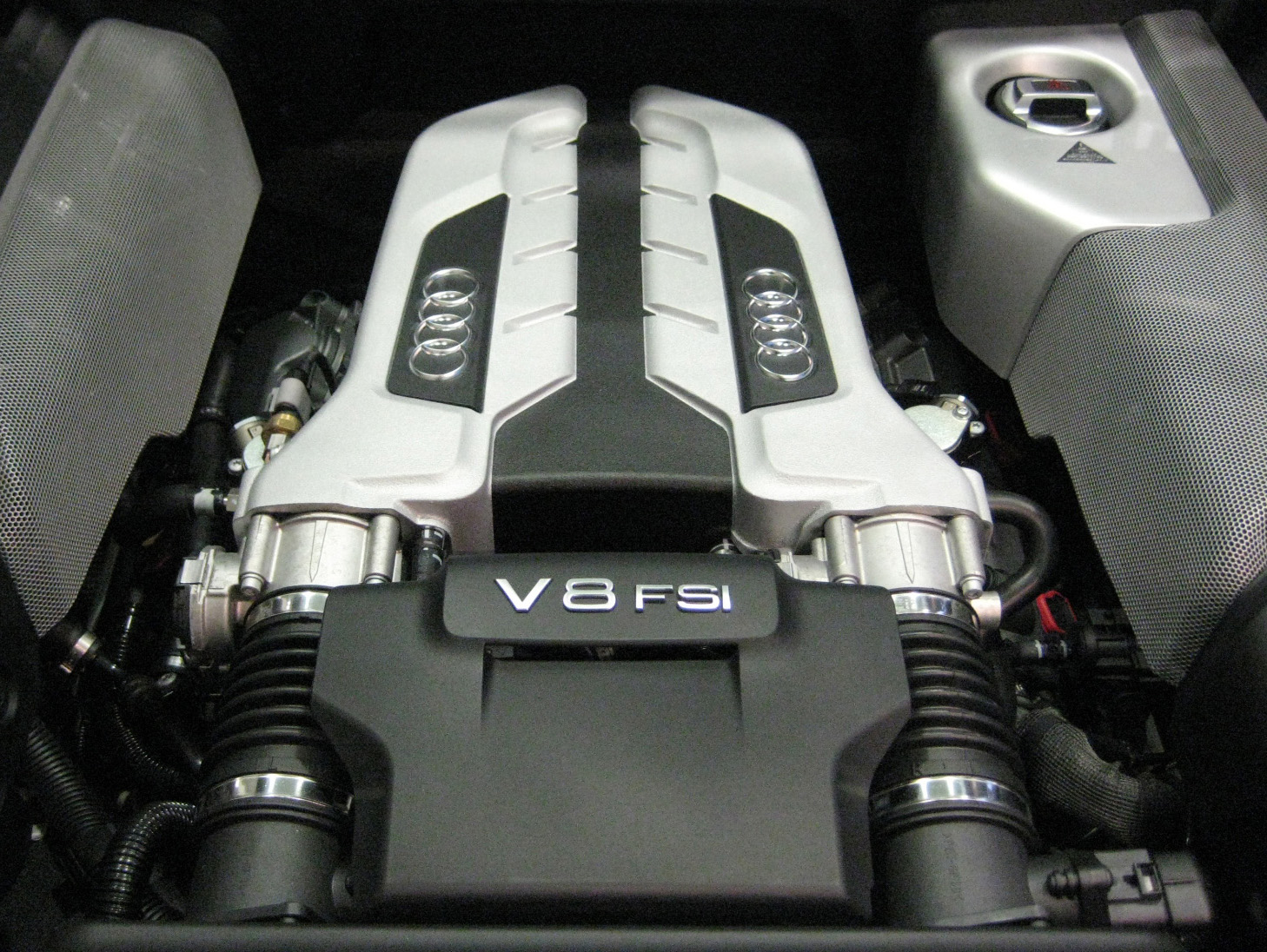
V8 FSI engine

==== Direct-Shift Gearbox ====
In 2003, Volkswagen introduced the Direct-Shift Gearbox (DSG), a type of dual-clutch transmission. It is a type of automatic transmission, drivable like a conventional torque converter automatic transmission. Based on the gearbox found in the Group B S1, the system includes dual electro-hydraulically controlled clutches instead of a torque converter. This is implemented in some VW Golfs, Audi A3, Audi A4 and TT models where DSG is called S-Tronic.

=== LED daytime running lights ===
Beginning in 2005, Audi has implemented white LED technology as daytime running lights (DRL) in its products. The distinctive shape of the DRLs has become a trademark of sorts. LEDs were first introduced on the Audi A8 W12, the world's first production car to have LED DRLs, and have since spread throughout the entire model range. The LEDs are present on some Audi billboards.

Since 2010, Audi has also offered the LED technology in low- and high-beam headlights.

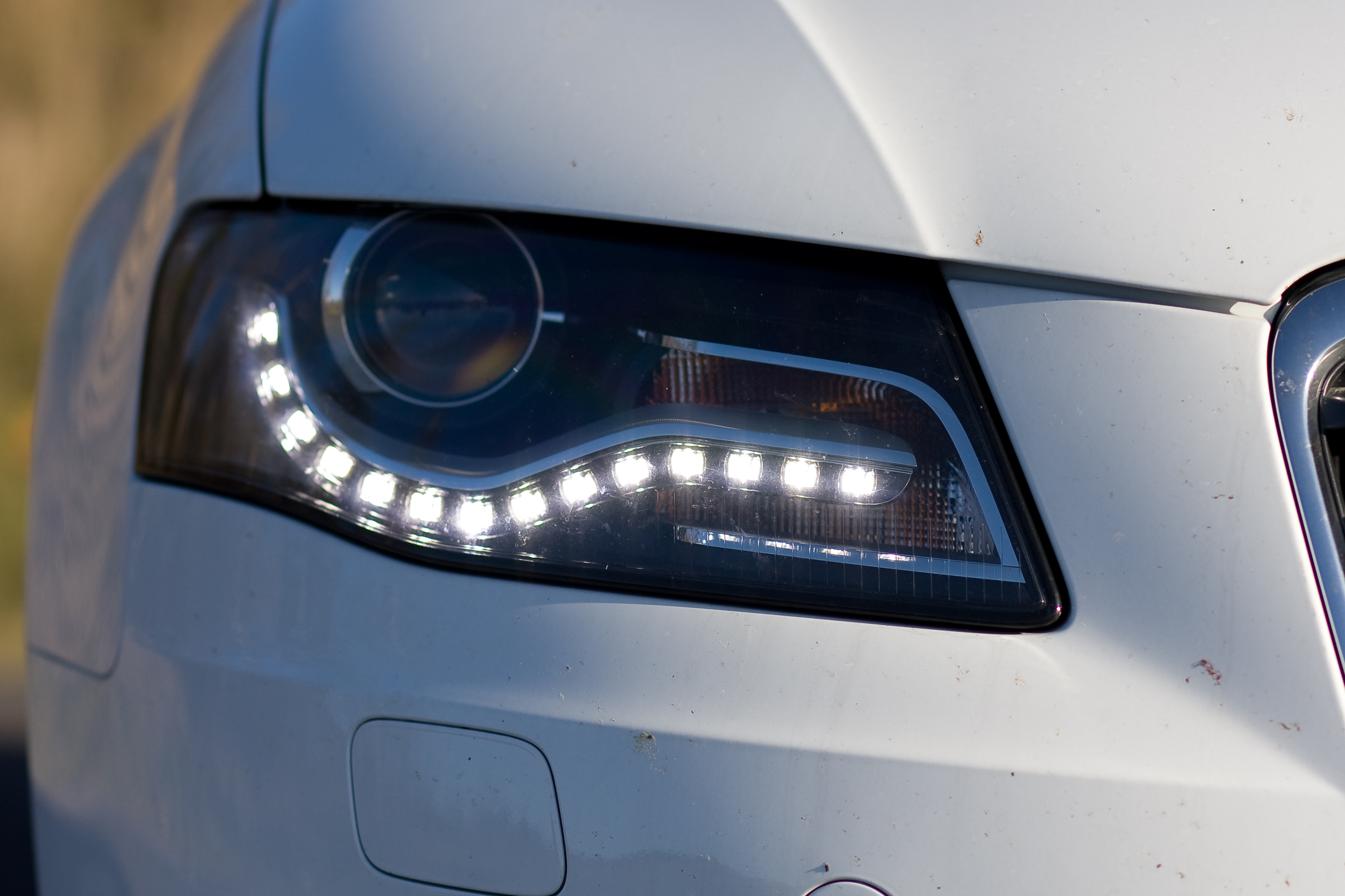
The DRL in an Audi A4 B8

=== Multi Media Interface ===
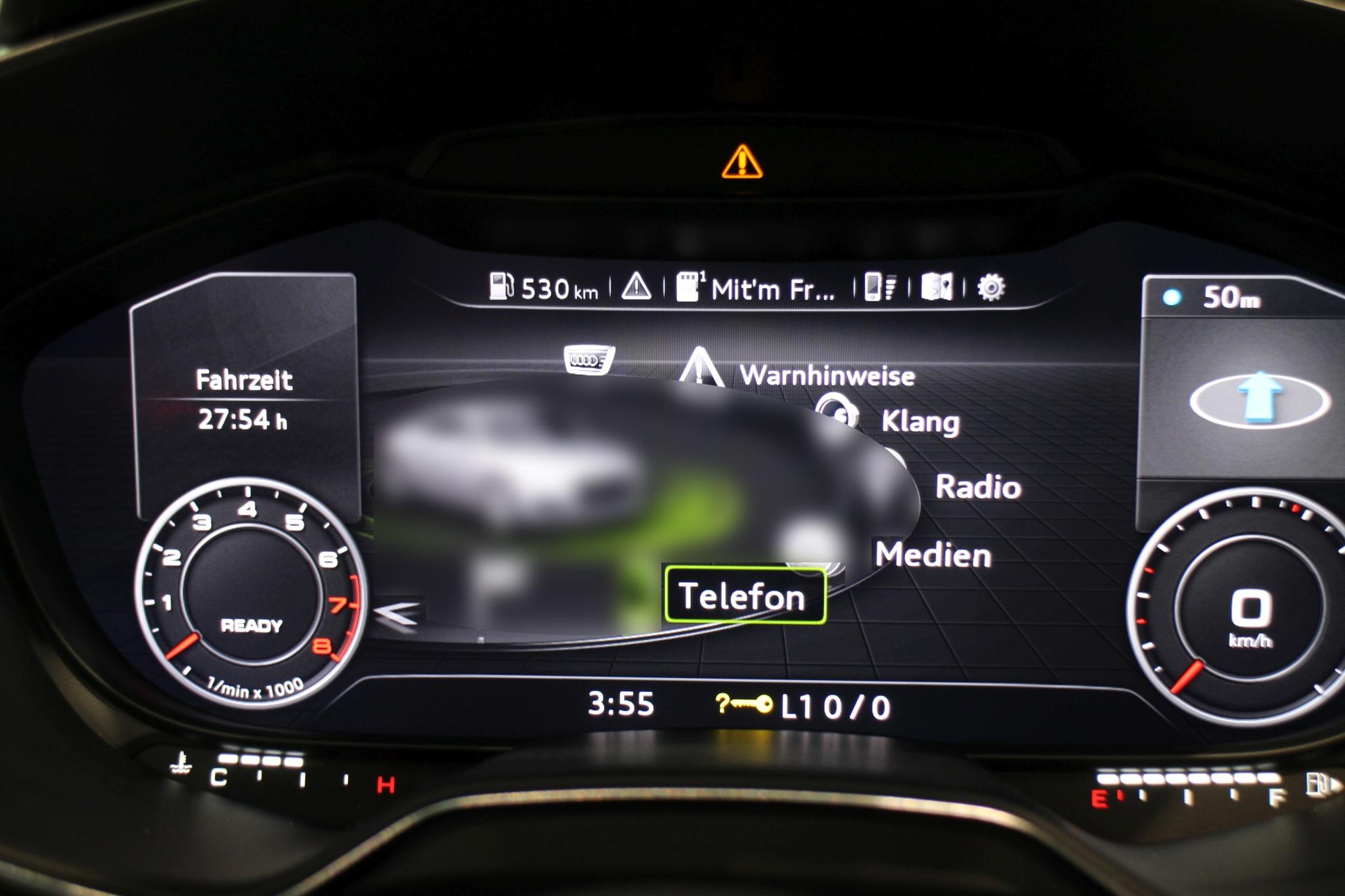
Multi Media Interface-Menu on Audi virtual cockpit, Audi TT Mk3

Starting with the 2003 Audi A8, Audi has used a centralised control interface for its on-board infotainment systems, called Multi Media Interface (MMI). It is essentially a rotating control knob and 'segment' buttons—designed to control all in-car entertainment devices (radio, CD changer, iPod, TV tuner), satellite navigation, heating and ventilation, and other car controls with a screen.

The availability of MMI has gradually filtered down the Audi lineup, and following its introduction on the third generation A3 in 2011, MMI is now available across the entire range. It has been generally well received, as it requires less menu-surfing with its segment buttons around a central knob, along with 'main function' direct access buttons—with shortcuts to the radio or phone functions. The colour screen is mounted on the upright dashboard, and on the A4 (new), A5, A6, A8, and Q7, the controls are mounted horizontally.

=== Synthetic fuels ===
Audi has assisted with technology to produce synthetic diesel from water and carbon dioxide. Audi calls the synthetic diesel E-diesel. It is also working on synthetic gasoline (which it calls E-gasoline). Though in 2022, Audi's technical development chief said "synthetic fuels are just a bridging technology for us".

=== Logistics ===
Audi uses scanning gloves for parts registration during assembly, and automatic robots to transfer cars from factory to rail cars.

== Models ==
=== Current model range ===
The following tables list Audi production vehicles that are sold as of 2026:

Audi cars
A2 e-tron	Electric compact car	Sportback (5-door hatchback)
A3	Small family car	Saloon (sedan); Sportback (5-door hatchback)
A5	Compact executive car	Saloon (4-door sedan); Saloon (5-door hatchback); Sportback (5-door hatchback); Avant (estate/wagon)
A6	Executive car	Saloon (sedan); Avant (estate/wagon)
A6 e-tron	Electric executive car	Saloon (5-door hatchback); Avant (estate/wagon)
A7L	Executive car	Saloon (sedan)
e-tron GT	Executive car	Saloon (sedan)
Nuvolari	Sports car	Coupé

Audi SUVs
Q3	Subcompact crossover SUV
Q4 e-tron	Electric compact crossover SUV
Q5	Compact crossover SUV
Q5 e-tron	Electric mid-size crossover SUV
Q6	Full-size crossover SUV
Q6 e-tron	Electric compact crossover SUV
Q7	Mid-size crossover SUV
Q8	Mid-size crossover SUV
Q9	Full-size crossover SUV

=== S and RS models ===
S (Sport) models
S3	Small family car	Saloon (sedan); Sportback (5-door hatchback)
S5	Compact executive car	Saloon (5-door hatchback); Avant (estate/wagon)
S6 e-tron	Executive car	Saloon (5-door hatchback); Avant (estate/wagon)
S e-tron GT	Executive car	Sportback (5-door hatchback)
SQ5	Compact SUV	Crossover
SQ7	Mid-size SUV	Crossover
SQ8	Mid-size SUV	Crossover
SQ9	Full-size SUV	Crossover

RS (Rennsport/racing sport) models
RS e-tron GT	Executive car	5-door fastback
RS 3	Small family car	Saloon (Sedan); 5-door hatchback
RS 5	Compact executive car	Saloon (5-door hatchback); Avant (estate/wagon)
RS Q8	Mid-size SUV	Crossover

=== Electric vehicles ===
Audi is planning an alliance with the Japanese electronics giant Sanyo to develop a pilot hybrid electric project for the Volkswagen Group. The alliance could result in Sanyo batteries and other electronic components being used in future models of the Volkswagen Group. Concept electric vehicles unveiled to date include the Audi A1 Sportback Concept, Audi A4 TDI Concept E, and the fully electric Audi e-tron Concept Supercar.

=== Self-driving cars ===
In December 2018, Audi announced to invest 14 billion Euro ($15.9 billion) in e-mobility, self-driving cars.

== Production figures ==
	A1	A2	A3	A4	A5	A6	A7	A8	Q2	Q3	Q4 e-tron	Q5	Q5 e-tron	Q6	Q6 e-tron	Q7	Q8	e-tron / Q8 e-tron	TT	R8	e-tron GT
1998	—	—	143,974	271,152	—	174,867	—	15,355	—	—	—	—	—	—	—	—	—	—	13,682	—	—
1999	—	—	143,505	252,514	—	162,573	—	14,636	—	—	—	—	—	—	—	—	—	—	52,579	—	—
2000	—	32,164	136,141	231,869	—	180,715	—	12,894	—	—	—	—	—	—	—	—	—	—	56,776	—	—
2001	—	49,369	131,082	308,778	—	186,467	—	11,708	—	—	—	—	—	—	—	—	—	—	39,349	—	—
2002	—	37,578	125,538	360,267	—	178,773	—	10,942	—	—	—	—	—	—	—	—	—	—	34,711	—	—
2003	—	27,323	159,417	353,836	—	168,612	—	21,748	—	—	—	—	—	—	—	—	—	—	32,337	—	—
2004	—	19,745	181,274	345,231	—	195,529	—	22,429	—	—	—	—	—	—	—	—	—	—	23,605	—	—
2005	—	10,026	224,961	337,705	—	215,437	—	21,515	—	—	—	—	—	—	—	1,185	—	—	12,307	—	—
2006	—	—	231,752	341,110	487	229,021	—	22,468	—	—	—	—	—	—	—	72,169	—	—	23,675	164	—
2007	—	—	231,117	289,806	25,549	243,842	—	22,182	—	—	—	162	—	—	—	77,395	—	—	56,766	4,125	—
2008	—	—	222,164	378,885	57,650	214,074	—	20,140	—	—	—	20,324	—	—	—	59,008	—	—	41,789	5,656	—
2009	—	—	206,747	282,033	84,883	182,090	—	8,599	—	—	—	105,074	—	—	—	27,929	—	—	22,821	2,101	—
2010	51,937	—	198,974	306,291	111,270	211,256	8,496	22,435	—	—	—	154,604	—	—	—	48,937	—	—	26,217	3,485	—
2011	117,566	—	189,068	321,045	111,758	241,862	37,301	38,542	—	19,613	—	183,678	—	—	—	53,703	—	—	25,508	3,551	—
2012	123,111	—	164,666	329,759	103,357	284,888	28,950	35,932	—	106,918	—	209,799	—	—	—	54,558	—	—	21,880	2,241	—
2013	120,520	—	221,170	337,990	98,207	288,697	30,962	35,932	—	152,756	—	231,466	—	—	—	63,543	—	—	18,358	2,500	—
2014	115,378	—	352,073	329,199	88,546	307,791	27,546	39,606	3	200,145	—	260,832	—	—	—	60,990	—	—	17,654	2,214	—
2015	116,250	—	369,968	318,468	79,133	293,675	29,131	27,007	67	205,201	—	267,651	—	—	—	82,422	—	—	35,510	2,074	—
2016	105,252	—	361,996	357,997	65,117	276,163	26,307	24,147	19,419	231,451	—	297,750	—	—	—	103,507	—	—	26,886	3,688	—
2017	95,346	—	313,479	325,307	119,595	259,618	16,968	15,854	102,084	205,001	—	289,892	—	—	—	106,807	436	4	22,174	3,179	—
2018	80,387	—	304,947	344,623	111,544	254,848	20,058	24,541	108,454	167,800	—	298,793	—	—	—	110,099	22,414	2,425	12,118	1,764	—
2019	81,287	—	240,809	323,387	93,077	232,605	17,068	23,826	130,207	195,639	—	286,365	—	—	—	63,753	44,890	43,376	14,999	2,121	—
2020	62,099	—	206,877	243,578	56,786	271,678	18,083	20,591	124,403	219,665	—	276,015	—	—	—	65,806	38,126	42,901	8,646	1,517	244
2021	60,158	—	164,299	199,628	64,012	227,237	16,533	22,285	103,046	250,852	27,519	279,712	99	—	—	56,600	35,406	44,972	8,489	1,679	9,602
2022	58,777	—	210,341	234,395	66,124	208,729	17,437	18,398	88,372	239,340	58,764	319,162	3,113	2,042	—	52,514	37,330	51,545	8,126	1,097	12,674
2023	64,859	—	246,279	237,830	75,584	257,111	34,622	20,442	94,406	233,472	125,441	334,480	5,506	5,151	7	74,891	47,002	54,856	9,530	2,127	10,045

- Figures for different body types/versions of models have been merged to create overall figures for each model.

== Motorsport ==
Audi has competed in various forms of motorsports. Audi's tradition in motorsport began with its former company Auto Union in the 1930s. In the 1990s, Audi found success in the Touring and Super Touring categories of motor racing after success in circuit racing in North America.

=== Rallying ===
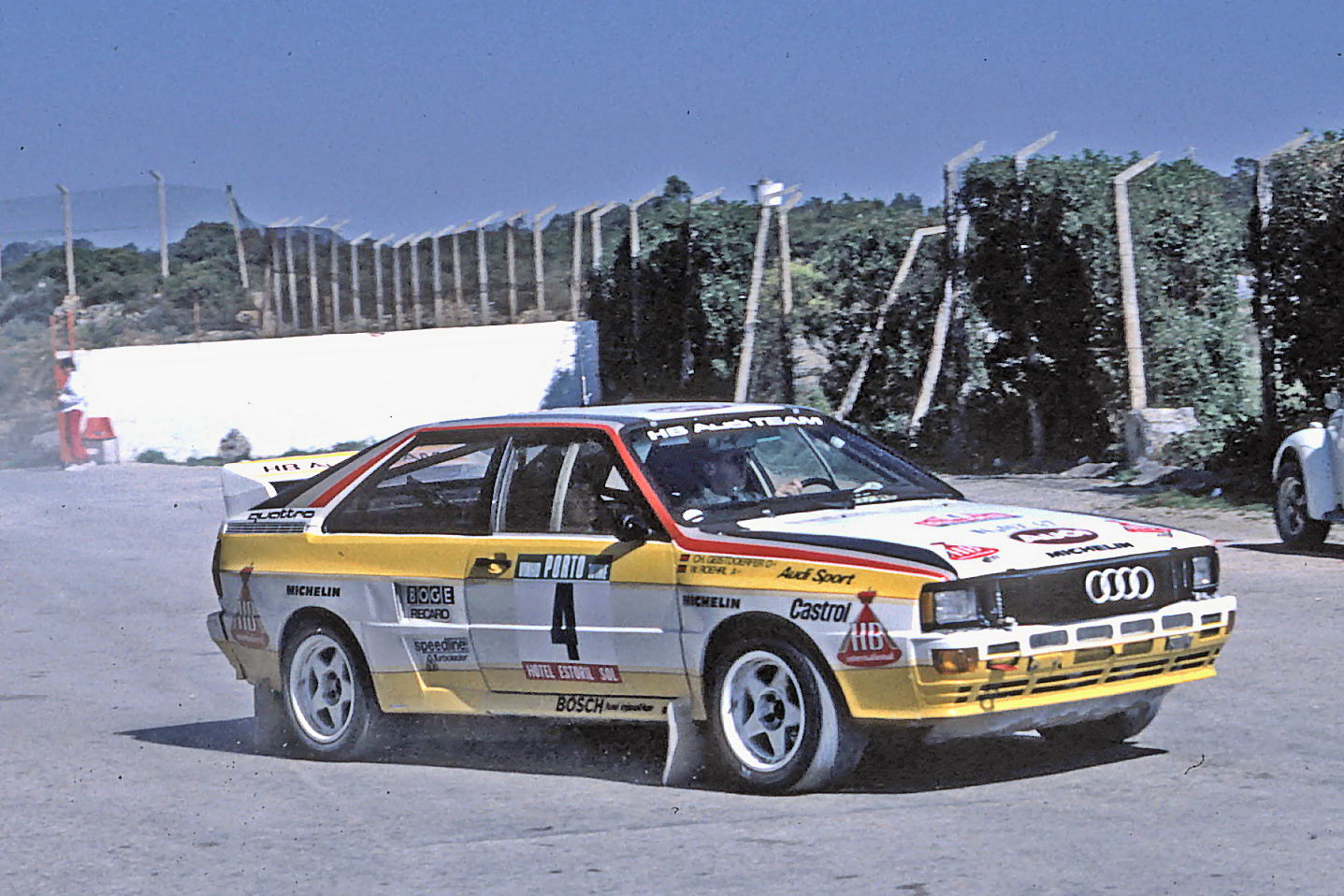
Walter Röhrl with his Quattro A2 during the 1984 Rally Portugal

In 1980, Audi released the Quattro, a four-wheel drive (4WD) turbocharged car that went on to win rallies and races worldwide. It is considered one of the most significant rally cars of all time, because it was one of the first to take advantage of the then-recently changed rules which allowed the use of four-wheel drive in competition racing. Many critics doubted the viability of four-wheel drive racers, thinking them to be too heavy and complex, yet the Quattro was to become a successful car. It led its first rally before going off the road, however, the rally world had been served notice 4WD was the future. The Quattro went on to achieve much success in the World Rally Championship. It won the 1983 (Hannu Mikkola) and the 1984 (Stig Blomqvist) drivers' titles, and brought Audi the manufacturers' title in 1982 and 1984.

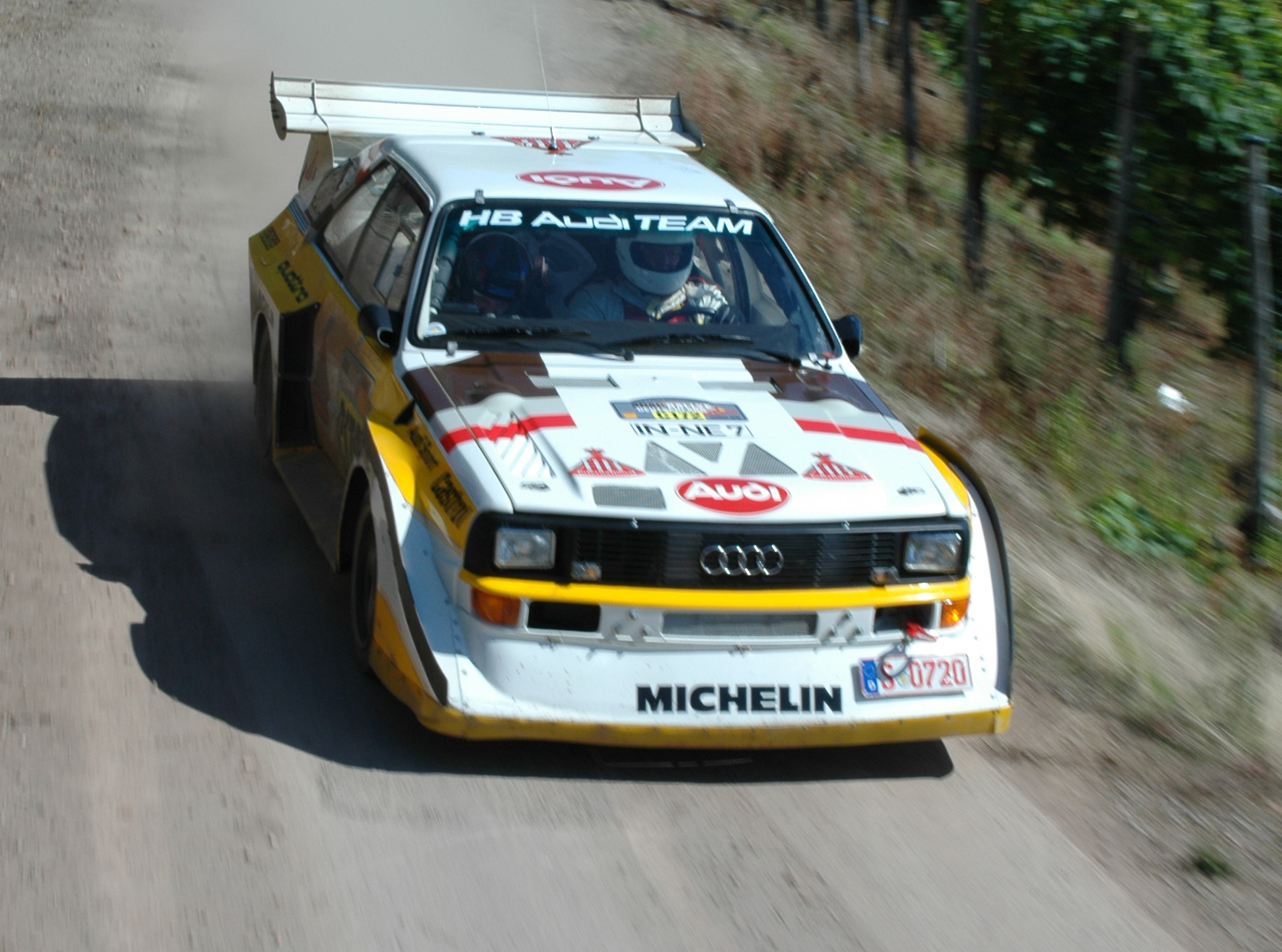
Audi Quattro S1 driven at the 2007 Rallye Deutschland

In 1984, Audi launched the short-wheelbase Sport Quattro which dominated rally races in Monte Carlo and Sweden, with Audi taking all podium places, but succumbed to problems further into WRC contention. In 1985, after another season mired in mediocre finishes, Walter Röhrl finished the season in his Sport Quattro S1, and helped place Audi second in the manufacturers' points. Audi also received rally honours in the Hong Kong to Beijing rally in that same year. Michèle Mouton, the only female driver to win a round of the World Rally Championship and a driver for Audi, took the Sport Quattro S1, now simply called the "S1", and raced in the Pikes Peak International Hill Climb. The 1,439-metre (4,721 ft) climb race pits a driver and car to drive to the summit of the 4,302-metre (14,114 ft) Pikes Peak mountain in Colorado, and in 1985, Michèle Mouton set a new record of 11:25.39, and being the first woman to set a Pikes Peak record. In 1986, Audi formally left international rallying following an accident in Portugal involving driver Joaquim Santos in his Ford RS200. Santos swerved to avoid hitting spectators in the road, and left the track into the crowd of spectators on the side, killing three and injuring 30. Bobby Unser used an Audi in that same year to claim a new record for the Pikes Peak Hill Climb at 11:09.22.

In 1987, Walter Röhrl claimed the title for Audi setting a new Pikes Peak International Hill Climb record of 10:47.85 in his Audi S1, which he had retired from the WRC two years earlier. The Audi S1 employed Audi's time-tested inline-five-cylinder turbocharged engine, with the final version generating 441 kW (600 PS; 591 bhp). The engine was mated to a six-speed gearbox and ran on Audi's famous four-wheel drive system. All of Audi's top drivers drove this car; Hannu Mikkola, Stig Blomqvist, Walter Röhrl and Michèle Mouton. This Audi S1 started the range of Audi 'S' cars, which now represents an increased level of sports-performance equipment within the mainstream Audi model range.

=== In the United States ===
As Audi moved away from rallying and into circuit racing, it chose to move first into America with the Trans-Am in 1988.

In 1989, Audi moved to International Motor Sports Association (IMSA) GTO with the Audi 90, however as it avoided the two major endurance events (Daytona and Sebring) despite winning on a regular basis, it would lose out on the title.

=== Touring cars ===
In 1990, having completed its objective to market cars in North America, Audi returned to Europe, turning first to the Deutsche Tourenwagen Meisterschaft (DTM) series with the Audi V8, and then in 1993, being unwilling to build cars for the new formula, it turned its attention to the fast-growing Super Touring series, which are a series of national championships. Audi first entered in the French Supertourisme and Italian Superturismo. In the following year, Audi would switch to the German Super Tourenwagen Cup (known as STW), and then to British Touring Car Championship (BTCC) the year after that.

The Fédération Internationale de l'Automobile (FIA), having difficulty regulating the quattro four-wheel drive system, and the impact it had on the competitors, eventually banned all four-wheel drive cars from competing in the series in 1998, but by then, Audi switched all its works efforts to sports car racing.

By 2000, Audi would still compete in the US with its RS4 for the SCCA Speed World GT Challenge, through dealer/team Champion Racing competing against Corvettes, Vipers, and smaller BMWs (where it is one of the few series to permit 4WD cars). In 2003, Champion Racing entered an RS6. Once again, the quattro four-wheel drive was superior, and Champion Audi won the championship. They returned in 2004 to defend its title, but a newcomer, Cadillac with the new Omega Chassis CTS-V, gave them a run for their money. After four victories in a row, the Audis were sanctioned with several negative changes that deeply affected the car's performance. Namely, added ballast weights, and Champion Audi deciding to go with different tyres, and reducing the boost pressure of the turbocharger.

In 2004, after years of competing with the TT-R in the revitalised DTM series, with privateer team Abt Racing/Christian Abt taking the 2002 title with Laurent Aïello, Audi returned as a full factory effort to touring car racing by entering two factory-supported Joest Racing A4 DTM cars.

=== 24 Hours of Le Mans ===
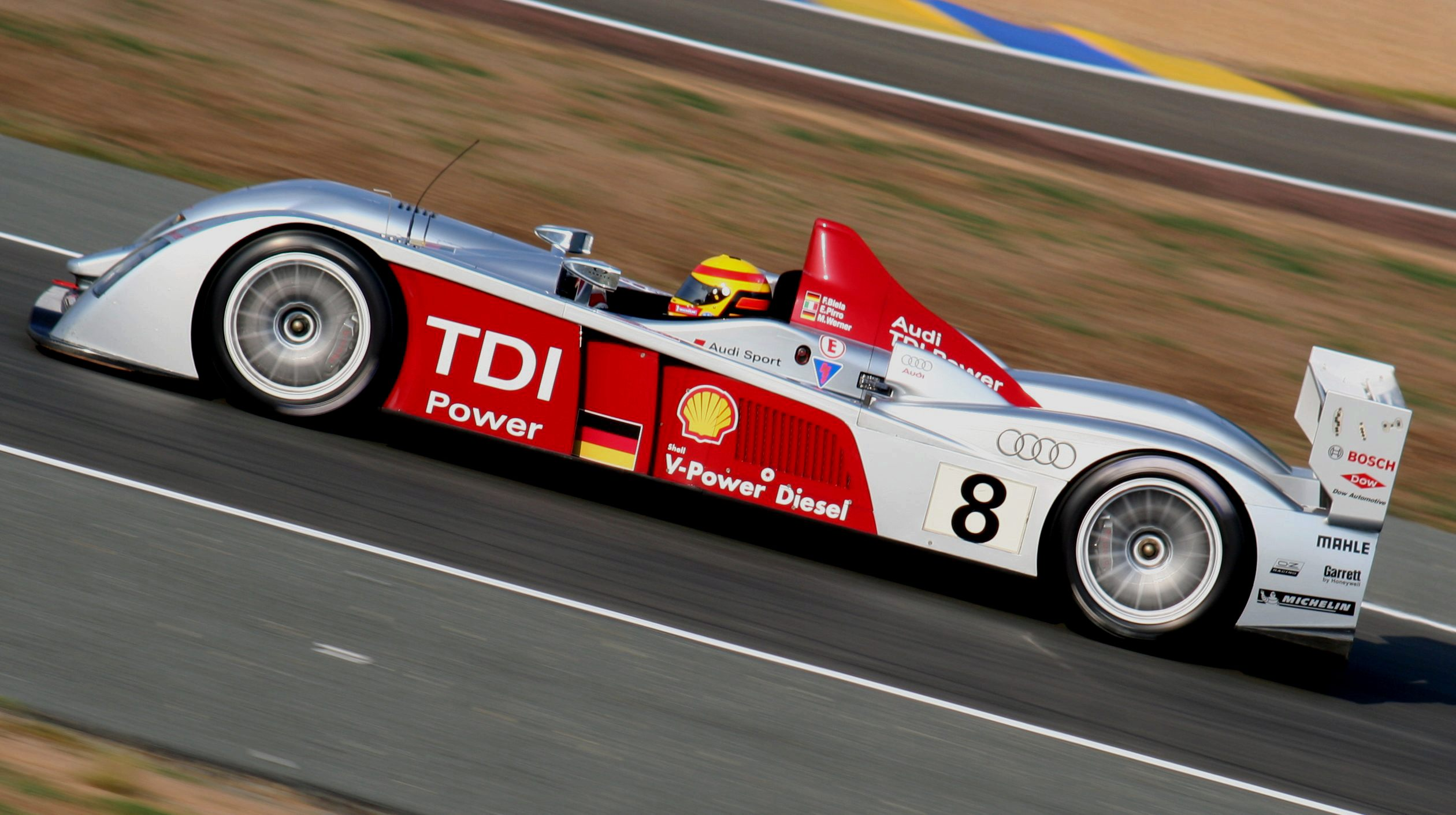
Audi R10 TDI

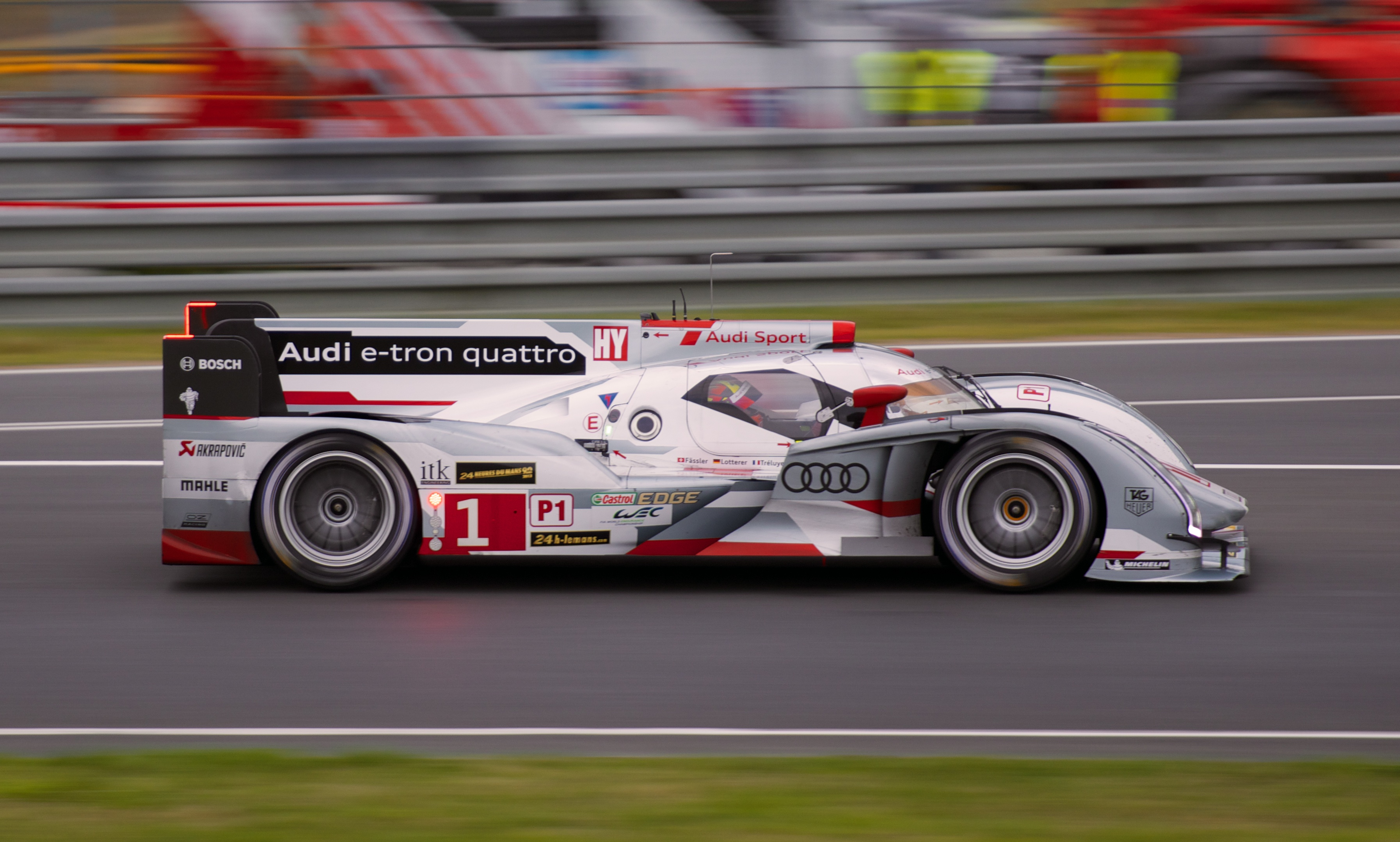
Audi R18 e-tron quattro

Audi began racing prototype sportscars in 1999, debuting at the Le Mans 24 hour. Two car concepts were developed and raced in their first season - the Audi R8R (open-cockpit 'roadster' prototype) and the Audi R8C (closed-cockpit 'coupé' GT-prototype). The R8R scored a credible podium on its racing debut at Le Mans and was the concept which Audi continued to develop into the 2000 season due to favourable rules for open-cockpit prototypes.

However, most of the competitors (such as BMW, Toyota, Mercedes and Nissan) retired at the end of 1999. The factory-supported Joest Racing team won at Le Mans three times in a row with the Audi R8 (2000–2002), as well as winning every race in the American Le Mans Series in its first year. Audi also sold the car to customer teams such as Champion Racing.

In 2003, two Bentley Speed 8s, with engines designed by Audi, and driven by Joest drivers loaned to the fellow Volkswagen Group company, competed in the GTP class, and finished the race in the top two positions, while the Champion Racing R8 finished third overall, and first in the LMP900 class. Audi returned to the winner's podium at the 2004 race, with the top three finishers all driving R8s: Audi Sport Japan Team Goh finished first, Audi Sport UK Veloqx second, and Champion Racing third.

At the 2005 24 Hours of Le Mans, Champion Racing entered two R8s, along with an R8 from the Audi PlayStation Team Oreca. The R8s (which were built to old LMP900 regulations) received a narrower air inlet restrictor, reducing power, and an additional 50 kg (110 lb) of weight compared to the newer LMP1 chassis. On average, the R8s were about 2–3 seconds off pace compared to the Pescarolo–Judd. But with a team of excellent drivers and experience, both Champion R8s were able to take first and third, while the Oreca team took fourth. The Champion team was also the first American team to win Le Mans since the Gulf Ford GTs in 1967. This also ends the long era of the R8; however, its replacement for 2006, called the Audi R10 TDI, was unveiled on 13 December 2005.

The R10 TDI employed many new and innovative features, the most notable being the twin-turbocharged direct injection diesel engine. It was first raced in the 2006 12 Hours of Sebring as a race-test in preparation for the 2006 24 Hours of Le Mans, which it later went on to win. Audi had a win in the first diesel sports car at 12 Hours of Sebring (the car was developed with a Diesel engine due to ACO regulations that favor diesel engines). As well as winning the 24 Hours of Le Mans in 2006, the R10 TDI beat the Peugeot 908 HDi FAP in 2007, and in 2008, (however Peugeot won the 24h in 2009) with a podium clean-sweep (all four 908 entries retired) while breaking a distance record (set by the Porsche 917K of Martini Racing in 1971), in 2010 with the R15 TDI Plus.

Audi's sports car racing success would continue with the Audi R18's victory at the 2011 24 Hours of Le Mans. Audi Sport Team Joest's Benoît Tréluyer earned Audi its first pole position in five years while the team's sister car locked out the front row. Early accidents eliminated two of Audi's three entries, but the sole remaining Audi R18 TDI of Tréluyer, Marcel Fässler, and André Lotterer held off the trio of Peugeot 908s to claim victory by a margin of 13.8 seconds.

==== Results ====
Car	Year	1999	2000	2001	2002	2003	2004	2005	2006	2007	2008	2009	2010	2011	2012	2013	2014	2015	2016
1	Position	4	3	1	1	4	3	3	3	1	6	3	3	Ret	1	5	2	3	4
2	Position	3	1	2	2	3	1	1	1	Ret	1	Ret	2	1	2	1	1	4	3
3	Position	Ret	2	Ret	3	Ret	5	4		Ret	4	17	1	Ret	5	3	Ret	7	
4	Position	Ret		Ret	7		2								3				

=== American Le Mans Series ===
Audi entered a factory racing team run by Joest Racing into the American Le Mans Series under the Audi Sport North America name in 2000. This was a successful operation with the team winning on its debut in the series at the 2000 12 Hours of Sebring. Factory-backed Audi R8s were the dominant car in ALMS taking 25 victories between 2000 and the end of the 2002 season. In 2003, Audi sold customer cars to Champion Racing as well as continuing to race the factory Audi Sport North America team. Champion Racing won many races as a private team running Audi R8s and eventually replaced Team Joest as the Audi Sport North America between 2006 and 2008. Since 2009 Audi has not taken part in full American Le Mans Series Championships, but has competed in the series opening races at Sebring, using the 12-hour race as a test for Le Mans, and also as part of the 2012 FIA World Endurance Championship season calendar.

==== Results ====
Year	Manufacturer	Chassis	Team	Rd1	Rd2	Rd3	Rd4	Rd5	Rd6	Rd7	Rd8	Rd9	Rd10	Rd11	Rd12
2000	(Germany) Audi	R8													
2000	(Germany) Audi	R8	(United States) Audi Sport North America	2	20	3	Ret	1	1	2	1	1	1	2	1
2000	(Germany) Audi	R8	(United States) Audi Sport North America	1	6	4	3	2	Ret	1	4	2	2	1	15
2001	(Germany) Audi	R8	(United States) Audi Sport North America	1	1	1	1	1	5	Ret	2	Ret	Ret		
2001	(Germany) Audi	R8	(United States) Audi Sport North America	2	2	2	2	2	2	1	4	1	1		
2002	(Germany) Audi	R8	(United States) Audi Sport North America	5	14	1	2	3	2	Ret	1	1	6		
2002	(Germany) Audi	R8	(United States) Audi Sport North America	1		2	1	2	1	1	4	3	1		
2003	(Germany) Audi	R8	(United States) Audi Sport North America	1	2	2	1	1	7	1	2	3			
2003	(Germany) Audi	R8	(United States) Champion Racing	2	1	3	2	20	1	4	1	1			
2004	(Germany) Audi	R8	(United Kingdom) Audi Sport UK	1											
2004	(Germany) Audi	R8	(United Kingdom) Audi Sport UK	2											
2004	(Germany) Audi	R8	(United States) Champion Racing	3	1	1	1	1	2	1	1	1			
2005	(Germany) Audi	R8	(United States) Champion Racing	1	1	18	1	3	Ret	3	2	7	4		
2005	(Germany) Audi	R8	(United States) Champion Racing	2	3	3	2	1	1	1	3	1	2		
2006	(Germany) Audi	R8	(United States) Audi Sport North America		1	3	1								
2006	(Germany) Audi	R10	(United States) Audi Sport North America	Ret				1	2	1	4	7	2		
2006	(Germany) Audi	R10	(United States) Audi Sport North America	1				4	1	2	1	1	1		
2007	(Germany) Audi	R10	(United States) Audi Sport North America	4	1	7	3	2	5	5	2	2	3	1	1
2007	(Germany) Audi	R10	(United States) Audi Sport North America	1	2	12	6	23	3	3	4	2	17	3	
2008	(Germany) Audi	R10	(United States) Audi Sport North America	3	Ret	2	Ret	21	2	2	2	DSQ	1	2	
2008	(Germany) Audi	R10	(United States) Audi Sport North America	6	1	1	7	4	1	1	1	Ret	3	1	
2009	(Germany) Audi	R15	(United States) Audi Sport North America	5											
2009	(Germany) Audi	R15	(United States) Audi Sport North America	4											
2010	(Germany) Audi	R15	(United States) Audi Sport North America	1											
2010	(Germany) Audi	R15	(United States) Audi Sport North America	3											
2012	(Germany) Audi	R18	(Germany) Audi Sport Team Joest	16											
2012	(Germany) Audi	R18	(Germany) Audi Sport Team Joest	1											
2012	(Germany) Audi	R18	(Germany) Audi Sport Team Joest	2											
2013	(Germany) Audi	R18	(Germany) Audi Sport Team Joest	1											
2013	(Germany) Audi	R18	(Germany) Audi Sport Team Joest	2											

=== European Le Mans Series ===
Audi participated in the 2003 1000km of Le Mans which was a one-off sports car race in preparation for the 2004 European Le Mans Series. The factory team Audi Sport UK won races and the championship in the 2004 season but Audi was unable to match its sweeping success of Audi Sport North America in the American Le Mans Series, partly due to the arrival of a factory competitor in LMP1, Peugeot. The French manufacturer's 908 HDi FAP became the car to beat in the series from 2008 onwards with 20 LMP wins. However, Audi were able to secure the championship in 2008 even though Peugeot scored more race victories in the season.

==== Results ====
Year	Manufacturer	Chassis	Team	Rd1	Rd2	Rd3	Rd4	Rd5
2003	(Germany) Audi	R8	Audi Sport Japan	1				
2004	(Germany) Audi	R8	(United Kingdom) Audi Sport UK	2	1	1	Ret	
2004	(Germany) Audi	R8	(United Kingdom) Audi Sport UK	1	2	3	1	
2004	(Germany) Audi	R8	Audi Sport Japan	3	4	2	2	
2005	(Germany) Audi	R8	(France) Team Oreca	Ret		1	2	2
2008	(Germany) Audi	R10	(Germany) Audi Sport Team Joest	5	6	4	4	1
2008	(Germany) Audi	R10	(Germany) Audi Sport Team Joest	2	2	2	3	4
2010	(Germany) Audi	R15	(Germany) Audi Sport Team Joest	1	3			Ret
2010	(Germany) Audi	R15	(Germany) Audi Sport Team Joest		5			3
2010	(Germany) Audi	R15	(Germany) Audi Sport Team Joest		12			

=== World Endurance Championship ===
==== 2012 ====
In 2012, the FIA sanctioned a World Endurance Championship which would be organised by the ACO as a continuation of the ILMC. Audi competed won the first WEC race at Sebring and followed this up with a further three successive wins, including the 2012 24 Hours of Le Mans. Audi scored a final 5th victory in the 2012 WEC in Bahrain and were able to win the inaugural WEC Manufacturers' Championship.

==== 2013 ====
As defending champions, Audi once again entered the Audi R18 e-tron quattro chassis into the 2013 WEC and the team won the first five consecutive races, including the 2013 24 Hours of Le Mans. The victory at Round 5, Circuit of the Americas, was of particular significance as it marked the 100th win for Audi in Le Mans prototypes. Audi secured its second consecutive WEC Manufacturers' Championship at Round 6 after taking second place and half points in the red-flagged Fuji race.

==== 2014 ====
For the 2014 season, Audi entered a redesigned and upgraded R18 e-tron quattro which featured a 2 MJ energy recovery system. As defending champions, Audi would once again face a challenge in LMP1 from Toyota, and additionally from Porsche who returned to endurance racing after a 16-year absence. The season-opening 6hrs of Silverstone was a disaster for Audi who saw both cars retire from the race, marking the first time that an Audi car has failed to score a podium in a World Endurance Championship race. The team won two races and finished second in the manufacturers' championship.

==== 2015 ====
Audi won the first two races of the season, but thereafter failed to win again, finishing second in the manufacturers' championship.

==== 2016 ====
For the third year in a row, Audi won two races and finished second in the manufacturers' championship. Audi had left WEC after the 2016 season.

==== Results ====
Year	Manufacturer	Chassis	SEB (United States)	SPA (Belgium)	LMS (France)	SIL (United Kingdom)	SÃO (Brazil)	BHR (Bahrain)	FUJ (Japan)	SHA (China)	Total points	Pos.
2012	(Germany) Audi	R18 e-tron quattro	1	1	1	1	2	1	2	2	173 (209)	1st

Year	Manufacturer	Chassis	SIL (United Kingdom)	SPA (Belgium)	LMS (France)	SÃO (Brazil)	COA (United States)	FUJ (Japan)	SHA (China)	BHR (Bahrain)	Total points	Pos.
2013	(Germany) Audi	R18 e-tron quattro	1	1	1	1	1	2	1	2	207 (207)	1st

Year	Manufacturer	Chassis	Car	SIL (United Kingdom)	SPA (Belgium)	LMS (France)	COA (United States)	FUJ (Japan)	SHA (China)	BHR (Bahrain)	SÃO (Brazil)	Total points	Pos.
2014	(Germany) Audi	R18 e-tron quattro	1	Ret	2	1	1	5	4	4	3	244	2nd
2014	(Germany) Audi	R18 e-tron quattro	2	Ret	5	2	2	6	5	5	5	244	2nd

Year	Manufacturer	Chassis	SIL (United Kingdom)	SPA (Belgium)	LMS (France)	NÜR (Germany)	COA (United States)	FUJ (Japan)	SHA (China)	BHR (Bahrain)	Total points	Pos.
2015	(Germany) Audi	R18 e-tron quattro	1	1	3	3	2	3	3	2	264	2nd
2015	(Germany) Audi	R18 e-tron quattro	5	5	4	4	3	4	4	6	264	2nd

Year	Manufacturer	Chassis	SIL (United Kingdom)	SPA (Belgium)	LMS (France)	NÜR (Germany)	MEX (Mexico)	COA (United States)	FUJ (Japan)	SHA (China)	BHR (Bahrain)	Total points	Pos.
2016	(Germany) Audi	R18 e-tron quattro	Ret	1	3	2	2	2	2	5	1	266	2nd
2016	(Germany) Audi	R18 e-tron quattro	EX	3	4	3	5	6	Ret	6	2	266	2nd

=== Formula E ===
Audi e-tron FE04

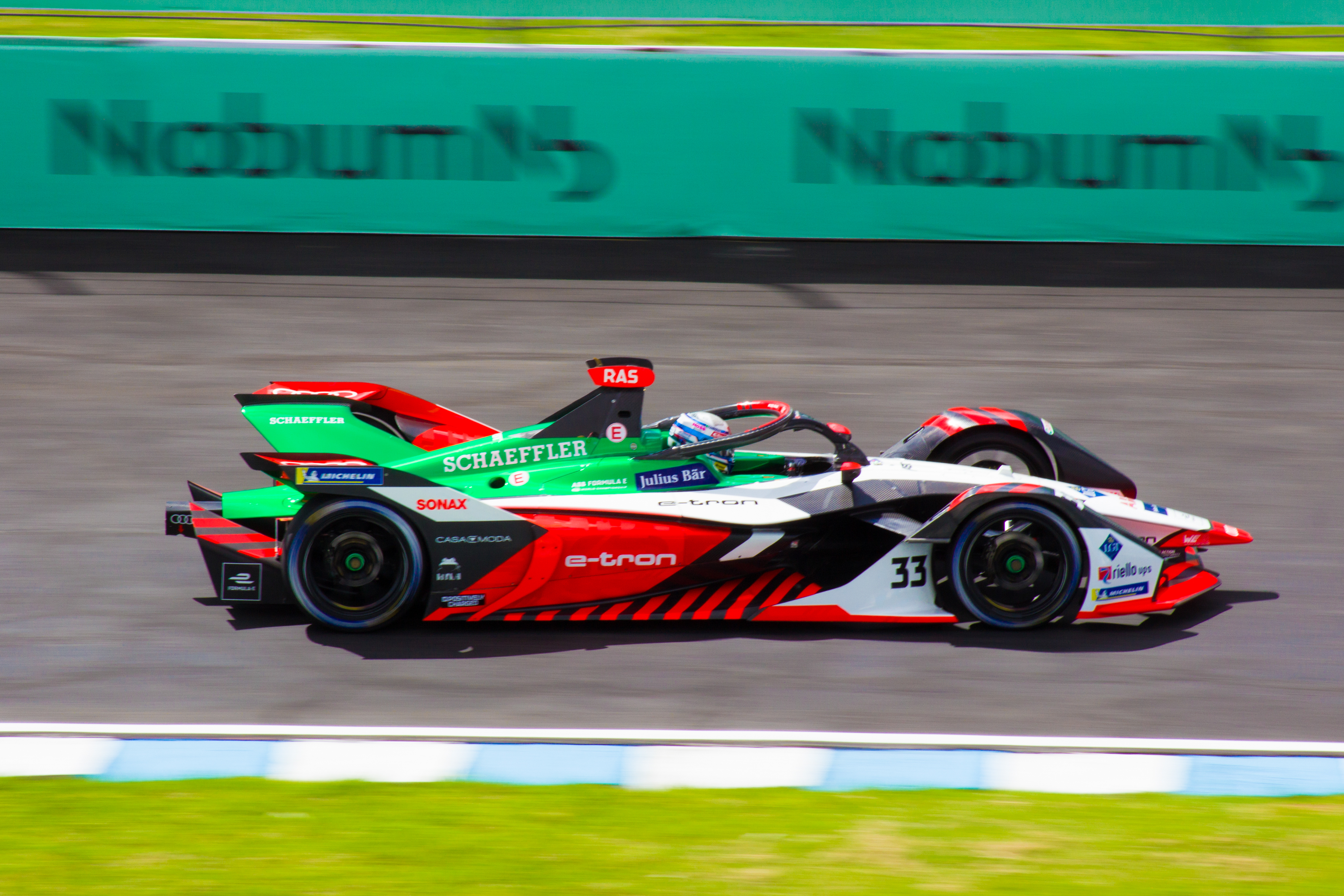
Audi e-tron FE07

Audi provided factory support to Abt Sportsline in the FIA Formula E Championship, The team competed under the title of Audi Sport Abt Formula E Team in the inaugural 2014-15 Formula E season. On 13 February 2014 the team announced its driver line up as Daniel Abt and World Endurance Championship driver Lucas di Grassi.

Audi had left Formula E after the 2020-21 Formula E season. Audi continued to provide its powertrain to Envision Racing for the 2021-22 Formula E season. Through the seven seasons in Formula E, Audi secured 14 victories, one Drivers' Champion with Lucas di Grassi and one Teams' Champion.

Year	Chassis	Powertrain	Tyres	No.	Drivers	1	2	3	4	5	6	7	8	9	10	11	12	13	14	15	Points	T.C.
Audi Sport Abt Formula E Team
2014–15	Spark SRT01-e	SRT01-e	M			BEI	PUT	PDE	BUE	MIA	LBH	MCO	BER	MSC	LDN						165	3rd
2014–15	Spark SRT01-e	SRT01-e	M	11	(Brazil) Lucas di Grassi	1	2	3	Ret	9	3	2	DSQ	2	4	6					165	3rd
2014–15	Spark SRT01-e	SRT01-e	M	66	(Germany) Daniel Abt	10	10	15	13†	3	15	Ret	14	5	Ret	11					165	3rd
Abt Schaeffler Audi Sport
2015–16	Spark SRT01-e	ABT Schaeffler FE01	M			BEI	PUT	PDE	BUE	MEX	LBH	PAR	BER	LDN							221	2nd
2015–16	Spark SRT01-e	ABT Schaeffler FE01	M	11	(Brazil) Lucas di Grassi	2	1	2	3	DSQ	1	1	3	4	Ret						221	2nd
2015–16	Spark SRT01-e	ABT Schaeffler FE01	M	66	(Germany) Daniel Abt	11	7	8	13	7	3	10	2	Ret	2						221	2nd
2016–17	Spark SRT01-e	ABT Schaeffler FE02	M			HKG	MRK	BUE	MEX	MCO	PAR	BER		NYC		MTL					248	2nd
2016–17	Spark SRT01-e	ABT Schaeffler FE02	M	11	(Brazil) Lucas di Grassi	2	5	3	1	2	Ret	2	3	4	5	1	7				248	2nd
2016–17	Spark SRT01-e	ABT Schaeffler FE02	M	66	(Germany) Daniel Abt	Ret	6	7	7	7	13	6	4	14	Ret	4	6				248	2nd
Audi Sport Abt Schaeffler
2017–18	Spark SRT01-e	Audi e-tron FE04	M			HKG		MRK	SCL	MEX	PDE	RME	PAR	BER	ZUR	NYC					264	1st
2017–18	Spark SRT01-e	Audi e-tron FE04	M	1	(Brazil) Lucas di Grassi	17	14	Ret	Ret	9	2	2	2	2	1	1	2				264	1st
2017–18	Spark SRT01-e	Audi e-tron FE04	M	66	(Germany) Daniel Abt	5	DSQ	10	Ret	1	14	4	7	1	13	2	3				264	1st
2018–19	Spark SRT05e	Audi e-tron FE05	M			ADR	MRK	SCL	MEX	HKG	SYX	RME	PAR	MCO	BER	BRN	NYC				203	2nd
2018–19	Spark SRT05e	Audi e-tron FE05	M	11	(Brazil) Lucas di Grassi	9	7	12	1	2	15†	7	4	Ret	1	9	5	18†			203	2nd
2018–19	Spark SRT05e	Audi e-tron FE05	M	66	(Germany) Daniel Abt	8	10	3	10	4	5	18†	3	15	6	6	6	5			203	2nd
2019–20	Spark SRT05e	Audi e-tron FE06	M			DIR		SCL	MEX	MRK	BER		BER		BER						114	6th
2019–20	Spark SRT05e	Audi e-tron FE06	M	11	(Brazil) Lucas di Grassi	13	2	7	6	7	8	3	8	6	21	6					114	6th
2019–20	Spark SRT05e	Audi e-tron FE06	M	66	(Germany) Daniel Abt	Ret	6	14	Ret	14											114	6th
2019–20	Spark SRT05e	Audi e-tron FE06	M	66	(Germany) René Rast						10	13	Ret	16	3^{G}	4					114	6th
2020–21	Spark SRT05e	Audi e-tron FE07	M			DIR		RME		VLC		MCO	PUE		NYC		LDN		BER	BER	165	4th
2020–21	Spark SRT05e	Audi e-tron FE07	M	11	(Brazil) Lucas di Grassi	9	8	Ret	Ret	7	10	10	1	18	3	14	6	DSQ	1	20	165	4th
2020–21	Spark SRT05e	Audi e-tron FE07	M	33	(Germany) René Rast	4	17	6	Ret	5	6	Ret	2	10	10	20	5	Ret	9	9	165	4th

=== Formula One ===
Audi has been linked to Formula One since the late 2010s, but has always resisted due to the company's opinion that it is not relevant to road cars, but hybrid power unit technology has been adopted into the sport, swaying the company's view and encouraging research into the program by former Ferrari team principal Stefano Domenicali.

Audi announced in August 2022 that it would enter the Championship as an engine manufacturer in 2026. In October, Audi confirmed its partnership with Sauber Motorsport for the year 2026, acquiring a stake in the company for the German brand to enter the competition by renaming the team and supplying engines. It originally had a 75% stake, but in 2024 announced it would buy the entire team outright with a 100% stake, to better coordinate its F1 program

On 26 April 2024, Sauber announced it had signed Nico Hülkenberg for 2025 onwards on a multi-year contract, confirming him as Audi's first driver in Formula One. Six months later, it confirmed that his teammate would be rookie Gabriel Bortoleto, the two replacing outgoing drivers Valtteri Bottas and Zhou Guanyu.After driving for Sauber in 2025, Audi retained both Nico and Gabriel for the 2026 season, and made its Formula One debut at the 2026 Australian Grand Prix. It entered its first season with Revolut, thus making the Revolut Audi F1 team.

=== Current factory drivers ===
- (Brazil) Gabriel Bortoleto
- (Switzerland) Ricardo Feller
- (Germany) Christopher Haase
- (Austria) Max Hofer
- (Germany) Nico Hülkenberg
- (Belgium) Gilles Magnus
- (Germany) Frank Stippler
- (Belgium) Frédéric Vervisch
- (Germany) Markus Winkelhock

=== Racecars ===
Year	Car	Image	Category
1979	Audi 80		Group 4
1981	Audi Coupe (B2)		Group 2
1981	Audi Quattro		Group 4
1983	Audi Quattro A1		Group B
1983	Audi 80 Quattro A2		Group B
1983	Audi Quattro A2		Group B
1984	Audi Sport Quattro S1		Group B
1985	Audi Sport Quattro E2		Group B
1986	Audi Sport Quattro RS 002		Group S
1987	Audi 200 Quattro		Group A
1987	Audi Coupé Quattro		Group A
1988	Audi 200 Quattro		Trans-Am
1989	Audi 90 Quattro		IMSA GTO
1999	Audi R8C		LMGTP
1999	Audi R8R		LMP900
2000	Audi R8		LMP900 LMP1
2004	Audi A4 DTM R11		DTM
2005	Audi A4 DTM R12		DTM
2006	Audi A4 DTM R12 plus		DTM
2006	Audi R10 TDI		LMP1
2007	Audi A4 DTM R13		DTM
2008	Audi A4 DTM R14		DTM
2009	Audi A4 DTM R14 plus		DTM
2009	Audi R8 LMS		Group GT3
2009	Audi R15 TDI		LMP1
2010	Audi R15 TDI Plus		LMP1
2011	Audi A4		NGTC
2011	Audi R18 TDI		LMP1
2012	Audi A5 DTM R17		DTM
2012	Audi R18 Ultra		LMP1
2012	Audi R18 e-Tron quattro		LMP1
2013	Audi RS5 DTM R17		DTM
2014	Audi R18 e-Tron quattro		LMP1
2014	Audi RS5 DTM RC3		DTM
2014	Audi S1 EKS RX quattro		Rallycross
2014	Audi S3 Saloon		NGTC
2015	Audi R8 LMS		Group GT3
2016	Audi R18 e-Tron quattro		LMP1
2017	Audi e-tron FE04		Formula E
2017	Audi R8 LMS GT4		SRO GT4
2017	Audi RS 3 LMS TCR		TCR
2018	Audi e-tron FE05		Formula E
2019	Audi e-tron FE06		Formula E
2019	Audi R8 LMS GT2		SRO GT2
2019	Audi RS5 Turbo DTM		GT500
2020	Audi e-tron FE07		Formula E
2021	Audi A1 SSM R4		Group R4
2021	Audi RS 3 LMS TCR (21)		TCR
2022	Audi RS Q e-tron		Group T1.U
2026	Audi R26		Formula One

== Marketing ==
=== Branding ===
The logo used by Audi, 1995–2009

The logo used by Audi, 2009–2016

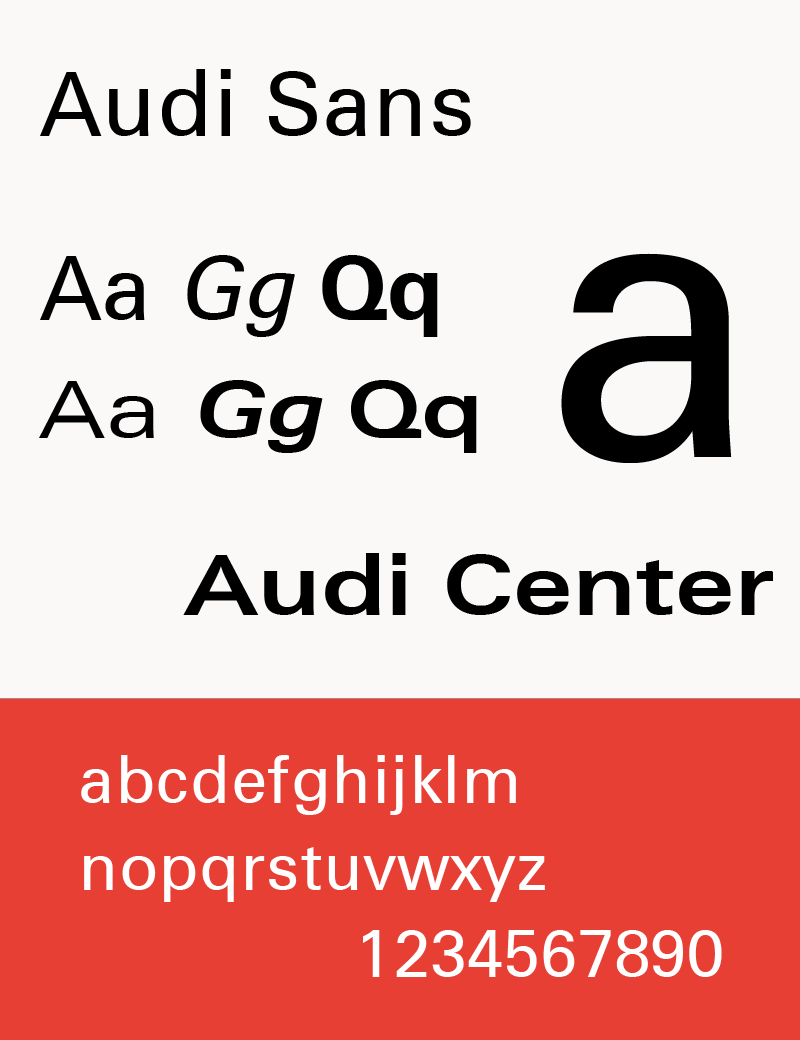
The typeface Audi Sans (used 1997–2009)

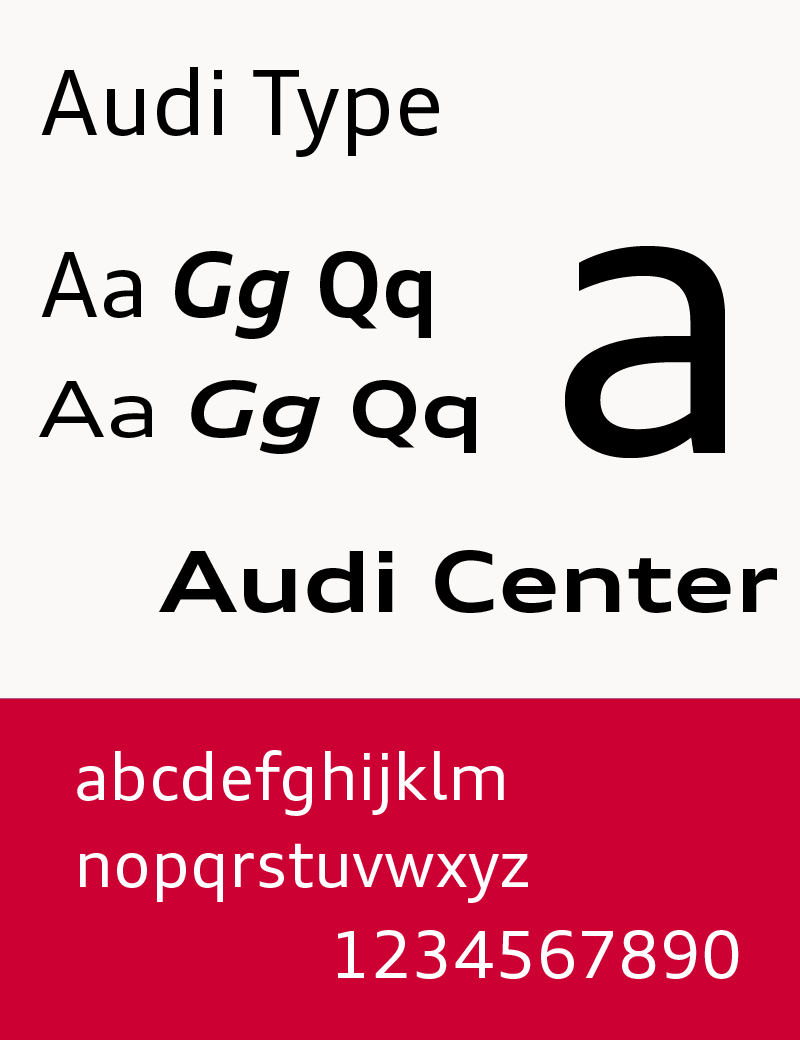
The typeface Audi Type (used since 2009)

The Audi emblem is four overlapping rings that represent the four marques of Auto Union. The Audi emblem symbolises the amalgamation of Audi with DKW, Horch and Wanderer: the first ring from the left represents Audi, the second represents DKW, third is Horch, and the fourth and last ring Wanderer. The design is popularly believed to have been the idea of Klaus von Oertzen, the director of sales at Wanderer—when Berlin was chosen as the host city for the 1936 Summer Olympics and that a form of the Olympic logo symbolized the newly established Auto Union's desire to succeed. Somewhat ironically, the International Olympic Committee later sued Audi in the International Trademark Court in 1995, where it lost.

The original "Audi" script, with the distinctive slanted tails on the "A" and "d" was created for the historic Audi company in 1920 by the famous graphic designer Lucian Bernhard, and was resurrected when Volkswagen revived the brand in 1965. Following the demise of NSU in 1977, less prominence was given to the four rings, in preference to the "Audi" script encased within a black (later red) ellipse, and was commonly displayed next to the Volkswagen roundel when the two brands shared a dealer network under the V.A.G banner. The ellipse (known as the Audi Oval) was phased out after 1994, when Audi formed its own independent dealer network, and prominence was given back to the four rings—at the same time Audi Sans (a derivative of Univers) was adopted as the font for all marketing materials, corporate communications and was also used in the vehicles themselves.

As part of Audi's centennial celebration in 2009, the company updated the logo, changing the font to left-aligned Audi Type, and altering the shading for the overlapping rings. The revised logo was designed by Rayan Abdullah.

Audi developed a Corporate Sound concept, with Audi Sound Studio designed for producing the Corporate Sound. The Corporate Sound project began with sound agency Klangerfinder GmbH & Co KG and s12 GmbH. Audio samples were created in Klangerfinder's sound studio in Stuttgart, becoming part of Audi Sound Studio collection. Other Audi Sound Studio components include The Brand Music Pool, The Brand Voice. Audi also developed Sound Branding Toolkit including certain instruments, sound themes, rhythm and car sounds which all are supposed to reflect the AUDI sound character.

Audi started using a beating heart sound trademark beginning in 1996. An updated heartbeat sound logo, developed by agencies KLANGERFINDER GmbH & Co KG of Stuttgart and S12 GmbH of Munich, was first used in 2010 in an Audi A8 commercial with the slogan The Art of Progress.

==== Slogans ====
Audi's corporate tagline is Vorsprung durch Technik [ˈfoːɐ̯ˌʃpʁʊŋ dʊʁç ˈtɛçnɪk], meaning 'Progress through Technology'. The German-language tagline is used in many European countries, including the United Kingdom (but not in Italy, where All'avanguardia della tecnica is used), and in other markets, such as Latin America, Oceania, Africa and parts of Asia including Japan. Originally, the American tagline was Innovation through technology, but in Canada Vorsprung durch Technik was used. Since 2007, Audi has used the slogan Truth in Engineering in the U.S. However, since the Audi emissions testing scandal came to light in September 2015, this slogan was lambasted for being discordant with reality. In fact, just hours after disgraced Volkswagen CEO Martin Winterkorn admitted to cheating on emissions data, an advertisement during the 2015 Primetime Emmy Awards promoted Audi's latest advances in low emissions technology with Kermit the Frog stating, "It's not that easy being green."

Vorsprung durch Technik was first used in English-language advertising after Sir John Hegarty of the Bartle Bogle Hegarty advertising agency visited the Audi factory in 1982. In the original British television commercials, the phrase was voiced by Geoffrey Palmer. After its repeated use in advertising campaigns, the phrase found its way into popular culture, including the British comedy Only Fools and Horses, the U2 song "Zooropa" and the Blur song "Parklife". Similar-sounding phrases have also been used, including as the punchline for a joke in the movie Lock, Stock and Two Smoking Barrels and in the British TV series Peep Show.

==== Typography ====
Audi Sans (based on Univers Extended) was originally created in 1997 by Ole Schäfer for MetaDesign. MetaDesign was later commissioned for a new corporate typeface called Audi Type, designed by Paul van der Laan and Pieter van Rosmalen of Bold Monday. The font began to appear in Audi's 2009 products and marketing materials.

=== Sponsorships ===
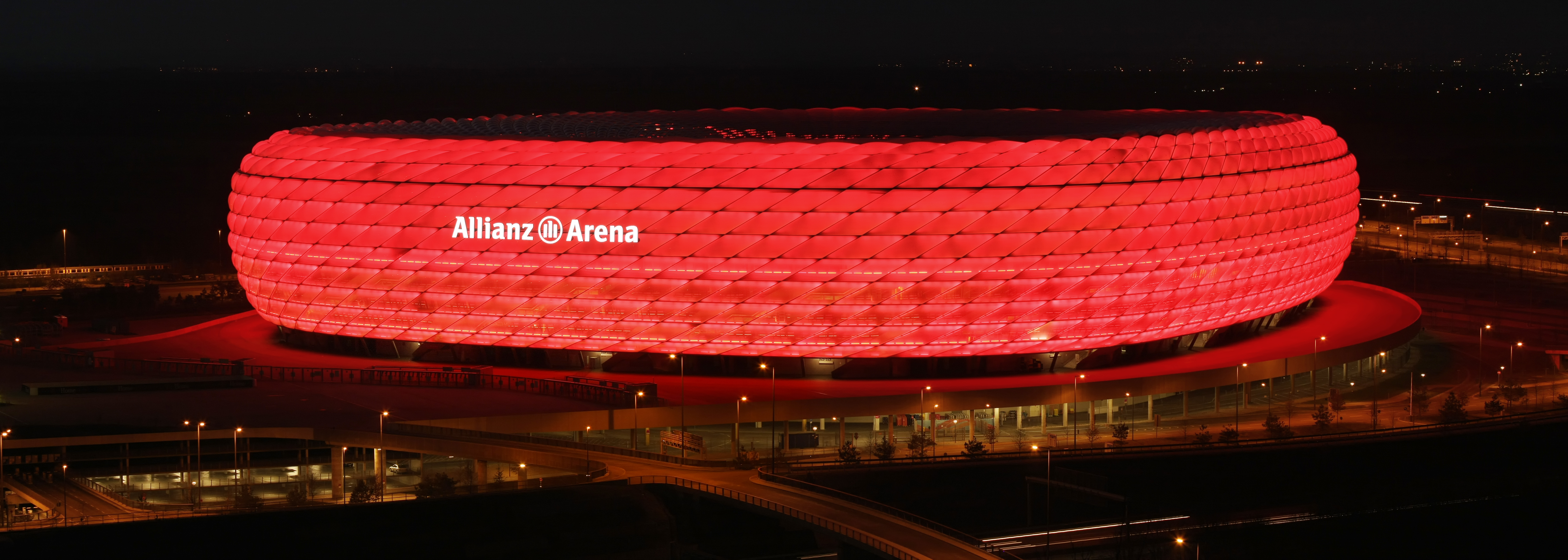
Audi sponsors Bundesliga club Bayern Munich

Audi is a strong partner of different kinds of sports. In football, long partnerships exist between Audi and domestic clubs including Bayern Munich, Hamburger SV, 1. FC Nürnberg, Hertha BSC, and Borussia Mönchengladbach and international clubs including Chelsea, Real Madrid, FC Barcelona, A.C. Milan, AFC Ajax and Perspolis. Audi also sponsors winter sports: The Audi FIS Alpine Ski World Cup is named after the company. Additionally, Audi supports the German Ski Association (DSV) as well as the alpine skiing national teams of Switzerland, Sweden, Finland, France, Liechtenstein, Italy, Austria and the U.S. For almost two decades, Audi fosters golf sport: for example with the Audi quattro Cup and the HypoVereinsbank Ladies German Open presented by Audi. In sailing, Audi is engaged in the Medcup regatta and supports the team Luna Rossa during the Louis Vuitton Pacific Series and also is the primary sponsor of the Melges 20 sailboat. Further, Audi sponsors the regional teams ERC Ingolstadt (hockey) and FC Ingolstadt 04 (soccer). In 2009, the year of Audi's 100th anniversary, the company organized the Audi Cup for the first time. Audi also sponsor the New York Yankees as well. In October 2010 it agreed to a three sponsorship year-deal with Everton. Audi also sponsors the England Polo Team and holds the Audi Polo Awards.

==== Collaborations ====
Audi primarily focuses on collaborations, of performance, sustainability, and full identity, partnering with brands like, 1 Hotels for Electric vehicles use, SingleThread Farm for restaurants, and Adidas for apparel. Other partnerships include football ties with FC Bayern and Inter Miami CF, along with winter sports sponsorships and the American Film Institute (AFI Conservatory) for filming.

==== Marvel Cinematic Universe ====
Since the start of the Marvel Cinematic Universe, Audi signed a deal to sponsor, promote and provide vehicles for several films. So far these have been, Iron Man, Iron Man 2, Iron Man 3, Avengers: Age of Ultron, Captain America: Civil War, Spider-Man: Homecoming, Avengers: Endgame and Spider-Man: Far From Home. The R8 supercar became the personal vehicle for Tony Stark (played by Robert Downey Jr.) for six of these films. The e-tron vehicles were promoted in Endgame and Far From Home. Several commercials were co-produced by Marvel and Audi to promote several new concepts and some of the latest vehicles such as the A8, SQ7 and the e-Tron fleet.

=== Multitronic campaign ===
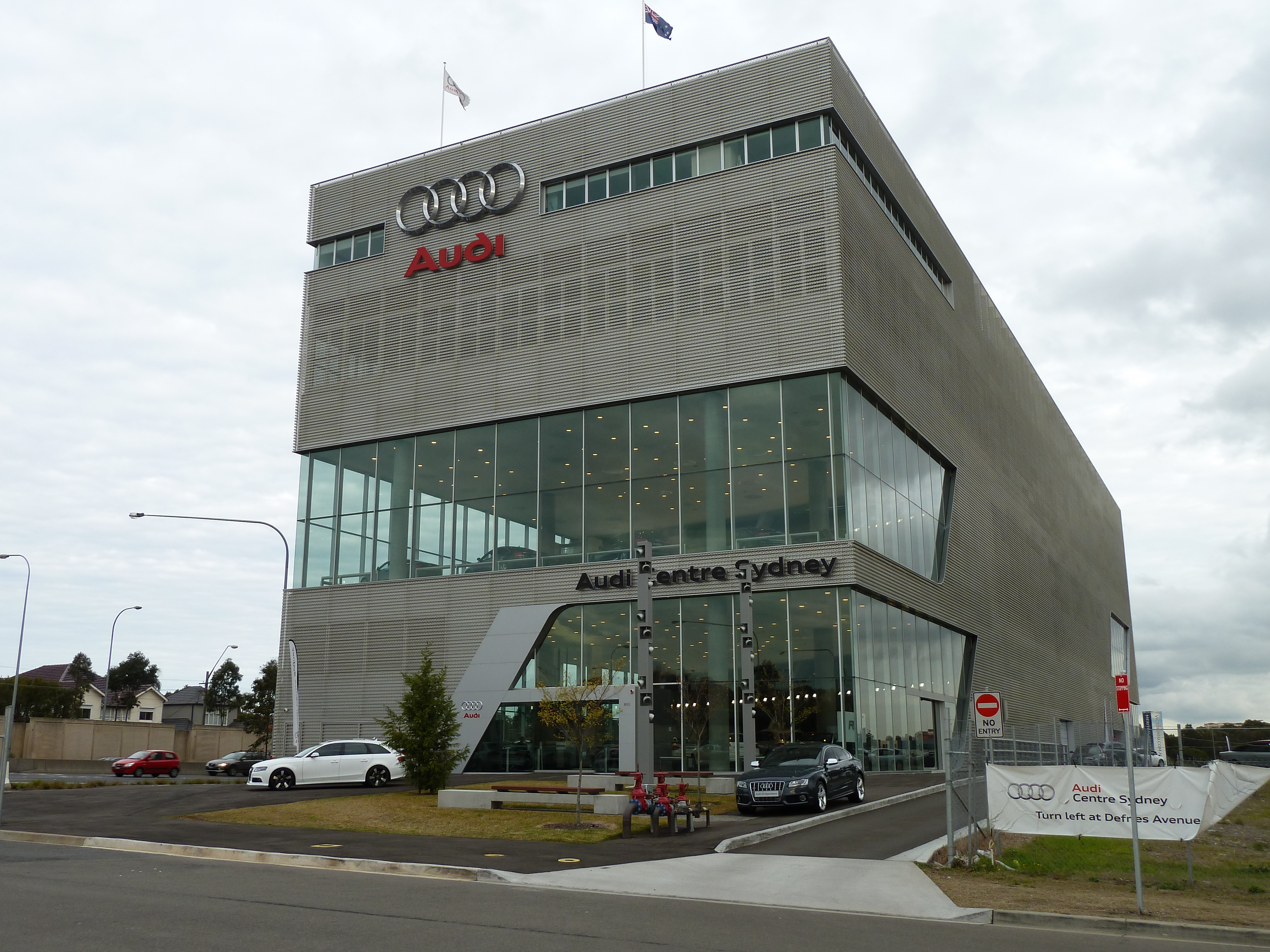
Audi Centre Sydney, Zetland, New South Wales, Australia

In 2001, Audi promoted the new multitronic continuously variable transmission with television commercials throughout Europe, featuring an impersonator of musician and actor Elvis Presley. A prototypical dashboard figure—later named "Wackel-Elvis" ("Wobble Elvis" or "Wobbly Elvis")—appeared in the commercials to demonstrate the smooth ride in an Audi equipped with the multitronic transmission. The dashboard figure was originally intended for use in the commercials only, but after it aired the demand for Wackel-Elvis fans grew among fans and the figure was mass-produced in China and marketed by Audi in its factory outlet store.

=== Audi TDI ===
As part of Audi's attempt to promote its Diesel technology in 2009, the company began Audi Mileage Marathon. The driving tour featured a fleet of 23 Audi TDI vehicles from 4 models (Audi Q7 3.0 TDI, Audi Q5 3.0 TDI, Audi A4 3.0 TDI, Audi A3 Sportback 2.0 TDI with S tronic transmission) travelling across the American continent from New York to Los Angeles, passing major cities like Chicago, Dallas and Las Vegas during the 13 daily stages, as well as natural wonders including the Rocky Mountains, Death Valley and the Grand Canyon.

=== Audi e-tron ===
The next phase of technology Audi is developing is the e-tron electric drive powertrain system. They have shown several concept cars as of March 2010, each with different levels of size and performance. The original e-tron concept shown at the 2009 Frankfurt motor show is based on the platform of the R8 and has been scheduled for limited production. Power is provided by electric motors at all four wheels. The second concept was shown at the 2010 Detroit Motor Show. Power is provided by two electric motors at the rear axle. This concept is also considered to be the direction for a future mid-engined gas-powered 2-seat performance coupe. The Audi A1 e-tron concept, based on the Audi A1 production model, is a hybrid vehicle with a range extending Wankel rotary engine to provide power after the initial charge of the battery is depleted. It is the only concept of the three to have range-extending capability. The car is powered through the front wheels, always using electric power.

It is all set to be displayed at the Auto Expo 2012 in New Delhi, India, from 5 January. It is powered by a 1.4 litre engine, and can cover a distance up to 54 km on a single charge. The e-tron was also shown in the 2013 blockbuster film Iron Man 3 and was driven by Tony Stark (Iron Man).

=== Lawsuit on the use of the letter Q ===
In early 2005, Nissan North America Inc. filed a lawsuit against Audi over the use of the letter "Q" as a model name.

Audi is using the "Q" for the designation of its quattro four-wheel drive system, used in production cars for over twenty-five years (Audi's Quattro trademark is actually an umbrella term for several types of four-wheel-drive systems developed by Torsen, Haldex Traction AB, and Borg-Warner, the latter being used in the Q7). Nissan's Infiniti marque first used Q for its 1989 Infiniti Q45 flagship, but later expanded to its entire lineup, with Q for passenger cars (the Q30, Q40, Q50, and Q60) and QX for SUVs (the QX30, QX50, QX60, and QX70).

A settlement between Audi AG and Nissan was reached in late 2006. The agreement stipulates that Audi will only use the Q-prefix for three models, the Q3, Q5 and the Q7. Audi has since released other Q series cars as well, such as the Q2, Q6, and Q8.

=== In video games ===
Audi has supported the European version of PlayStation Home, the PlayStation 3's online community-based service, by releasing a dedicated Home space. Audi is the first carmaker to develop such a space for Home. On 17 December 2009, Audi released two spaces; the Audi Home Terminal and the Audi Vertical Run. The Audi Home Terminal features an Audi TV channel delivering video content, an Internet Browser feature, and a view of a city. The Audi Vertical Run is where users can access the mini-game Vertical Run, a futuristic mini-game featuring Audi's e-tron concept. Players collect energy and race for the highest possible speeds and the fastest players earn a place in the Audi apartments located in a large tower in the centre of the Audi Space. In both the Home Terminal and Vertical Run spaces, there are teleports where users can teleport back and forth between the two spaces. Audi had stated that additional content would be added in 2010. On 31 March 2015, Sony shutdown the PlayStation Home service rendering all content for it inaccessible.

== Controversy ==
Audi has faced multiple allegations of the Volkswagen Group diesel emissions scandal ("Dieselgate"), where it used software to cheat in emissions tests. Other accusations controversies include sexist marketing in China, an "insensitive" child-safety ad, and largely discredited claims of "sudden acceleration" in the 1980s.

Diesel Emissions Scandal (2015–2018): Audi was implicated in using "defeat devices" in 3.0-liter V6 and V8 diesel engines to bypass emissions standards, leading to a €800 million fine in 2018. The scandal affected over 4.9 million cars worldwide.

Sexism in Advertising (2017): An Audi China advertisement depicted a mother-in-law inspecting a bride's teeth, ears, and nose, comparing the vetting process to buying a used car. The ad was widely condemned as treating women like products.

"Banana" Ad Controversy (2020): Audi apologized for an ad on social media that featured a young child leaning on the grille of a high-performance car while eating a banana. Critics cited the image as both unsafe and sexually suggestive.

Gasoline Engine Allegations: Beyond diesel, reports have suggested potential "defeat device" usage in Audi's luxury gasoline-powered models, including the A6, A7, Q5, and Q7, leading to class-action lawsuits.

Sudden Acceleration Scare (1980s): In the 1980s, the Audi 5000 faced public panic over unintended acceleration. While this severely damaged the brand, investigations later found that many incidents were caused by driver error—specifically mistaking the accelerator for the brake pedal—and were amplified by media coverage.

== See also ==
- DKW, Horch and Wanderer (company) – predecessors of Audi.
- Volkswagen Group – parent company of current Audi.
