= List of Audi vehicles =

The following is a list of Audi vehicles, including past and present production models, as well as concept vehicles and limited editions. The current era of Audi production dates to 1968, when present-day owner Volkswagen Group, which had purchased Auto Union from Mercedes-Benz in 1965, debuted the first modern Audi-branded vehicles. This revived the Audi nameplate, which was first used in 1910, but was largely supplanted by Auto Union in the 1930s.

== Current models ==
Model	Calendar year introduced	Current model		Vehicle description
Model	Calendar year introduced	Introduction	Update/facelift	Vehicle description
Hatchbacks
A2 e-tron	2026	2026	–	All-electric subcompact executive hatchback.
A3	1996	2020	2024	Subcompact executive hatchback. Only for Europe and select export markets.
Sedans
A3	2013	2020	2024	Subcompact executive sedan. Globally offered.
A5	2007	2024	–	Compact executive liftback.
A6	1994	2025	–	Mid-size executive sedan.
A7L	2010	2021	–	Mid-size executive sedan for the Chinese market.
A6 e-tron	2024	2024	–	All-electric mid-size executive sedan.
e-tron GT	2020	2020	2024	All-electric executive sedan.
Wagons
A5	2024	2024	–	Compact executive station wagon.
A6	1994	2025	–	Mid-size executive station wagon.
A6 e-tron	2024	2024	–	All-electric executive station wagon.
Sports cars
Nuvolari	2027	2027	–	Mid-engine hybrid sports car.
SUVs/Crossovers
Q3	2011	2025	–	Subcompact luxury crossover SUV.
Q3	2019	2025	–	Coupe SUV version of the Q3 with a sloping rear roof line.
Q4 e-tron	2021	2021	2026	All-electric compact luxury crossover SUV.
Q4 e-tron	2021	2021	2026	Coupe SUV version of the Q4 e-tron with a sloping rear roof line.
Q5	2008	2024	-	Compact luxury crossover SUV.
Q5	2021	2024	-	Coupe SUV version of the Q5 with a sloping rear roof line.
Q5 e-tron	2022	2022	–	Electric mid-size luxury crossover SUV for the Chinese market.
Q6	2022	2022	-	Full-size luxury crossover SUV for the Chinese market.
Q6 e-tron	2024	2024	-	All electric SUV. This model is not related to the Chinese market Q6.
Q6 e-tron	2024	2024	–	Coupe SUV version of the Q6 e-tron with a sloping rear roof line.
Q7	2005	2026	-	Mid-size luxury crossover SUV.
Q8	2018	2018	2023	Mid-size luxury crossover SUV.
Q9	2026	2026	–	Full-size luxury crossover SUV, Audi's flagship SUV globally.

== Model chronology ==
The following are models sorted by year of introduction.

=== 1960s ===
- Audi F103 (1969–1972)
- Audi 100 (1968–1978)

=== 1970s ===
- Audi 80 (1972–1978)
- Audi 50 (1974–1978)
- Audi 100 (1969–1976)
- Audi 100 Coupé S (1969–1974)
- Audi 80 (1978–1986)
- Audi 200 (1979–1984)

=== 1980s ===
- Audi 200
- (1982–1990)
- Audi 80 quattro (1980–1987)
- Audi 5+5 (1981–1983)
- Audi 90 (1984–1987)
- Audi Coupé (1980–1988)
- Audi Sport quattro (1983–1984)
- Audi 80 (1986–1991)
- Audi 90 (1986–1991)
- Audi V8 (1988–1995)
- Audi Coupé (1988–1995)

=== 1990s ===
- Audi 100/A6 (1991–1998)
- Audi 80 (1991–1996)
- Audi Cabriolet (1991–2000)
- Audi A6 (C4) (1994–1997)
- Audi A8 (D2) (1994–2002)
- Audi A4 (B5) (1994–2001)
- Audi A3 (8L) (1996–2003)
- Audi A6 (C5) (1997–2006)
- Audi Duo (1997)
- Audi TT (Mk1) (1998–2006)
- Audi A2 (1999–2006)
- Audi 90 (1993)

=== 2000s ===
- Audi A4 (B6) (2001–2006)
- Audi A8 (D3) (2003–2010)
- Audi A3 (8P) (2003–2013)
- Audi A4 (B7) (2004–2009)
- Audi A6 (C6) (2004–2011)
- Audi Q7 (4L) (2005–2015)
- Audi TT (Mk2) (2006–2014)
- Audi A4 (B8) (2007–2015)
- Audi A5 (8T/8F) (2007–2016)
- Audi Q5 (8R) (2008–2017)
- Audi R8 (Type 42) (2006–2015)

=== 2010s ===
- Audi A1 (8X) (2010–2018)
- Audi A7 (4G8) (2010–2018)
- Audi A8 (D4) (2010–2017)
- Audi A6 (C7) (2011–2018)
- Audi Q3 (8U) (2011–2018)
- Audi A3 (8V) (2012–2020)
- Audi TT (Mk3) (2014–2023)
- Audi A4 (B9) (2015–2024)
- Audi Q7 (4M) (2015–2026)
- Audi R8 (Type 4S) (2015–2024)
- Audi A5 (F5) (2016–2024)
- Audi Q5 (FY) (2016–2024)
- Audi Q2 (2017–2026)
- Audi A8 (D5) (2017–2026)
- Audi Q3 (F3) (2018–2025)
- Audi Q8 (2018–present)
- Audi A6 (C8) (2018–2025)
- Audi A7 (4K8) (2018–2025)
- Audi Q8 e-tron (2018–2025)
- Audi A1 (GB) (2019–2026)

=== 2020s ===
- Audi A3 (8Y) (2020–present)
- Audi e-tron GT (2020–present)
- Audi Q4 e-tron (2021–present)
- Audi Q5 e-tron (2022–present)
- Audi Q6 (2022–present)
- Audi Q6 e-tron (2024–present)
- Audi A5 (B10) (2024–present)
- Audi A6 e-tron (2024–present)
- Audi Q5 (GU) (2024–present)
- Audi A6 (C9) (2025–present)
- Audi Q3 (FJ) (2025–present)
- Audi A2 e-tron (2026-present)
- Audi Q7 (G8) (2026–present)
- Audi Q9 (2026-present)
- Audi Nuvolari (2026–present)

== Electric models ==
- Audi Q8 e-tron (2018–2025)
- Audi e-tron GT (2021–present)
- R8 e-tron sports car (2015)
- Audi Q2 e-tron (2017–2026)
- Audi Q4 e-tron (2022–present)
- Audi Q5 e-tron (2022–present)
- Audi Q6 e-tron (2025–present)
- Audi A6 e-tron (2024–present)

== Discontinued models ==
=== 1965–1990 ===
F103	80	90	100	50	200	Coupé	Sport Quattro	Quattro	V8	S2
1965–1972	1966–1996	1966–1996	1968–1994	1974–1978	1979–1991	1980–1988	1984–1985	1980–1991	1988–1993	1990–1995

=== 1991–2026 ===
Cabriolet	RS2 Avant	A4	A8	TT	A2	R8	A1	Q2	Q8 e-tron
1991–2000	1994–1995	1994–2025	1994–2026	1998–2023	1999–2005	2006–2024	2010–2026	2017–2026	2018–2025

== Concept models ==
=== 1981–2001 ===
Quartz	Quattro Spyder	Avus quattro	AL2	Rosemeyer	Avantissimo	Steppenwolf
1981	1991	1991	1997	2000	2001	2001

=== 2003–2007 ===
Le Mans quattro	Nuvolari quattro	Pikes Peak quattro	RSQ	Shooting Brake	Roadjet	Cross Cabriolet quattro
2003	2003	2003	2004	2005	2006	2007

=== 2008–2009 ===
A1 project quattro	A1 Sportback	R8 TDI Le Mans	TT Clubsport quattro	Cross concept	Sportback	e-tron concept
2007/2008	2008	2008	2008	2009	2009	2009

=== 2010–2011 ===
A1 e-tron	Quattro	A1 clubsport quattro	e-tron Spyder	Urban Spyder	A2 concept	A3 concept
2010	2010	2011	2011	2011	2011	2011

== Historical models ==
=== 1910–1928 ===
Type A	Type B	Type C	Type D	Type E	Type G	Type K	Type M
1910-1912	1910-1914	1912-1921	1912-1920	1913-1924	1914-1923	1922-1925	1925-1928

=== 1928–1940 ===
Type R	Type S/SS	Type T	Type P	Front UW 220	Front UW 225	Type C/D racer	920
1928-1932	1929-1932	1931-1932	1931-1932	1933-1934	1935-1938	1938	1938-1940

== Racing models ==
=== Le Mans prototypes ===
R8C	R8R	R8	R10 TDI	R15 TDI	R18 TDI	R18 ultra
1999	1999	2000	2006	2009	2011	2012

R18 e-tron quattro (RP2)	R18 e-tron quattro (RP3)	R18 e-tron quattro (RP4)	R18 e-tron quattro (RP5)	R18 e-tron quattro (RP6)
2012	2013	2014	2015	2016

=== Grand Touring ===
R8 LMS GT3 (R16)	R8 LMS ultra GT3	R8 LMS GT3	R8 LMS GT4
2009	2012	2015	2017

=== Cup ===
TT Cup
2015

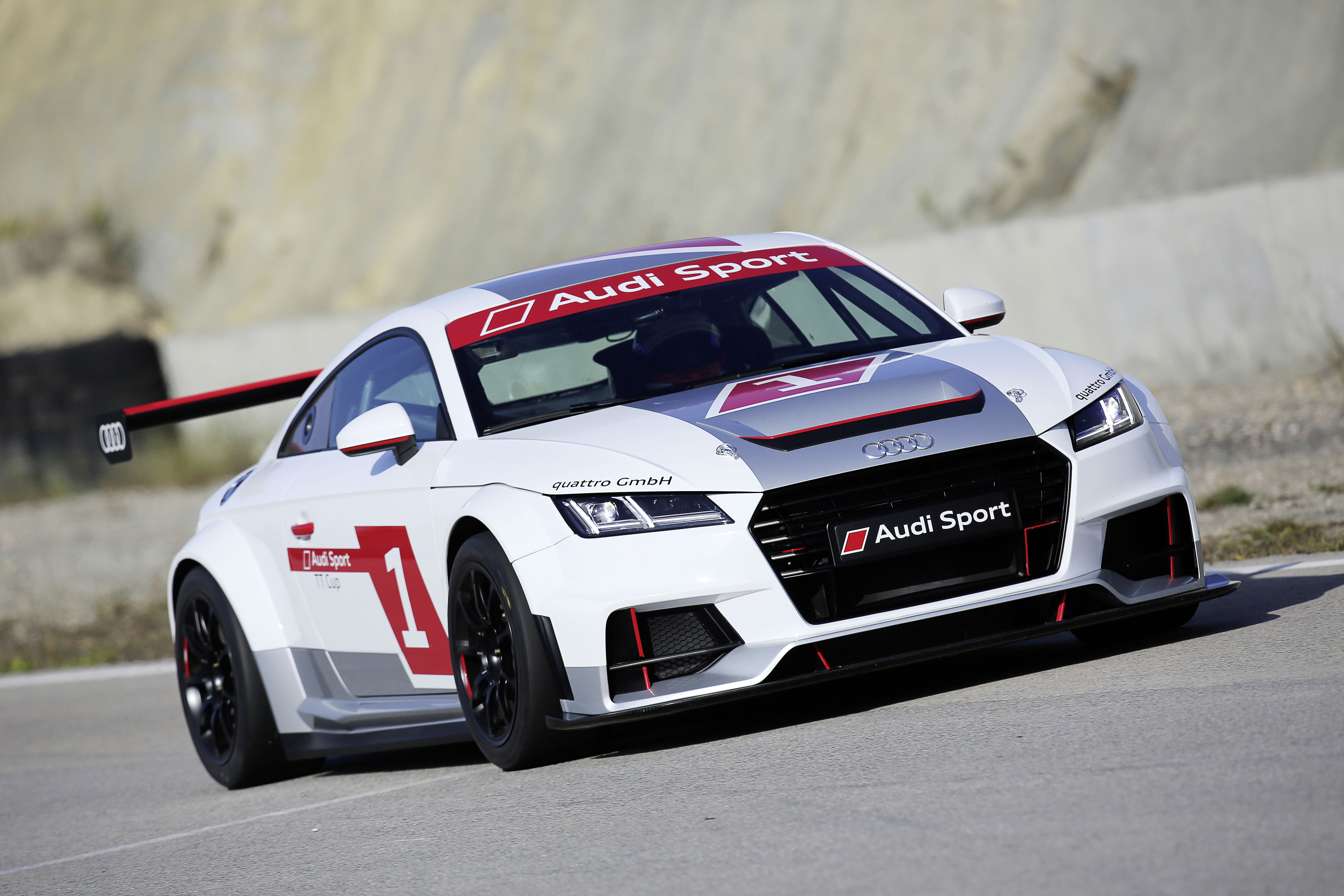

=== Touring Cars/Silhouettes ===
200 quattro (R4)	90 quattro (R5)	V8 quattro (R6)	80 quattro (R7)	80 quattro Competition (R7)	A4 quattro Supertouring (R7)	S4 Competition
1988	1989	1990	1989	1994	1995	2000

RS6 Competition	A4 DTM (R11)	A5/RS5 DTM (R17)	RS5 DTM (RC3)	RS3 LMS TCR	RS5 Turbo DTM
2003	2004	2012	2014	2017	2019

=== Rally and RallyCross ===
quattro (R1)	Sport quattro S1 (R2)	Sport quattro S1 E2 (R2)	200 quattro (R3)	S1 EKS RX quattro	RS Q e-tron
1980	1984	1985	1987	2014	2022
			placeholder image		

=== Formula single-seaters ===
SRT01-e	ABT Schaeffler FE01	ABT Schaeffler FE02	Audi e-tron FE04	Audi e-tron FE05	Audi e-tron FE06	Audi e-tron FE07
2014–2015	2015–2016	2016–2017	2017–2018	2018–2019	2019–2020	2020–2022

R26
2026

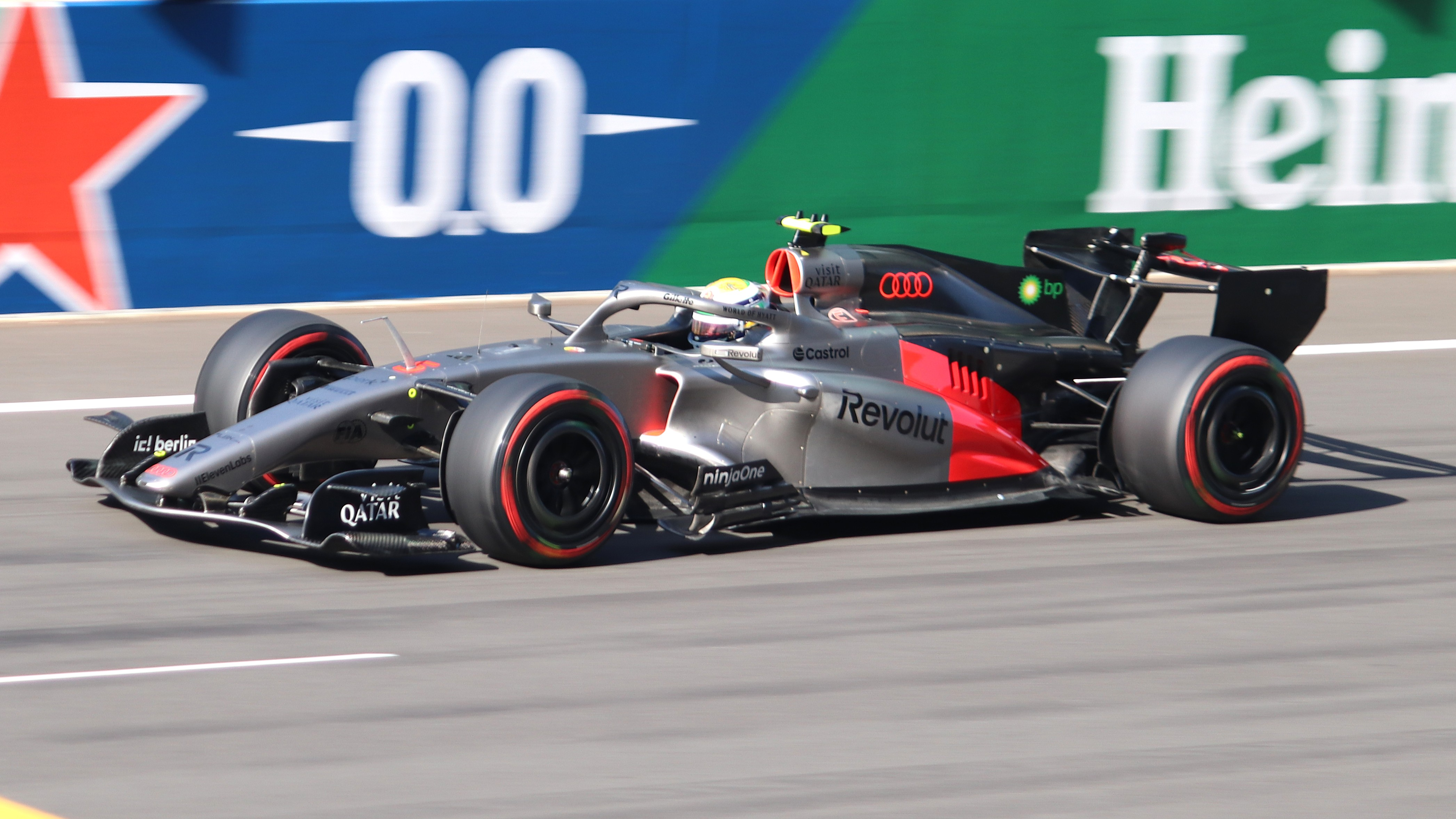

== See also ==
- List of automobiles
- List of Audi engines
- List of Audi platforms
