= Type G =

Type G or G type may refer to:

- G-Type, a fictional character from Marvel Comics
- the type G plug
- a G-type main-sequence star
- a G-type asteroid
- a type of thermocouple
- the Renault G-Type engine
- the Avro Type G, a biplane
- the Caudron Type G, a biplane
- the Handley Page Type G, a biplane
- the Audi Type G, a moderately early car
- the Renault Voiturette Type G, an early car
- Immunoglobulin G, an antibody type
- G type Adelaide tram
