= Audi Type T =

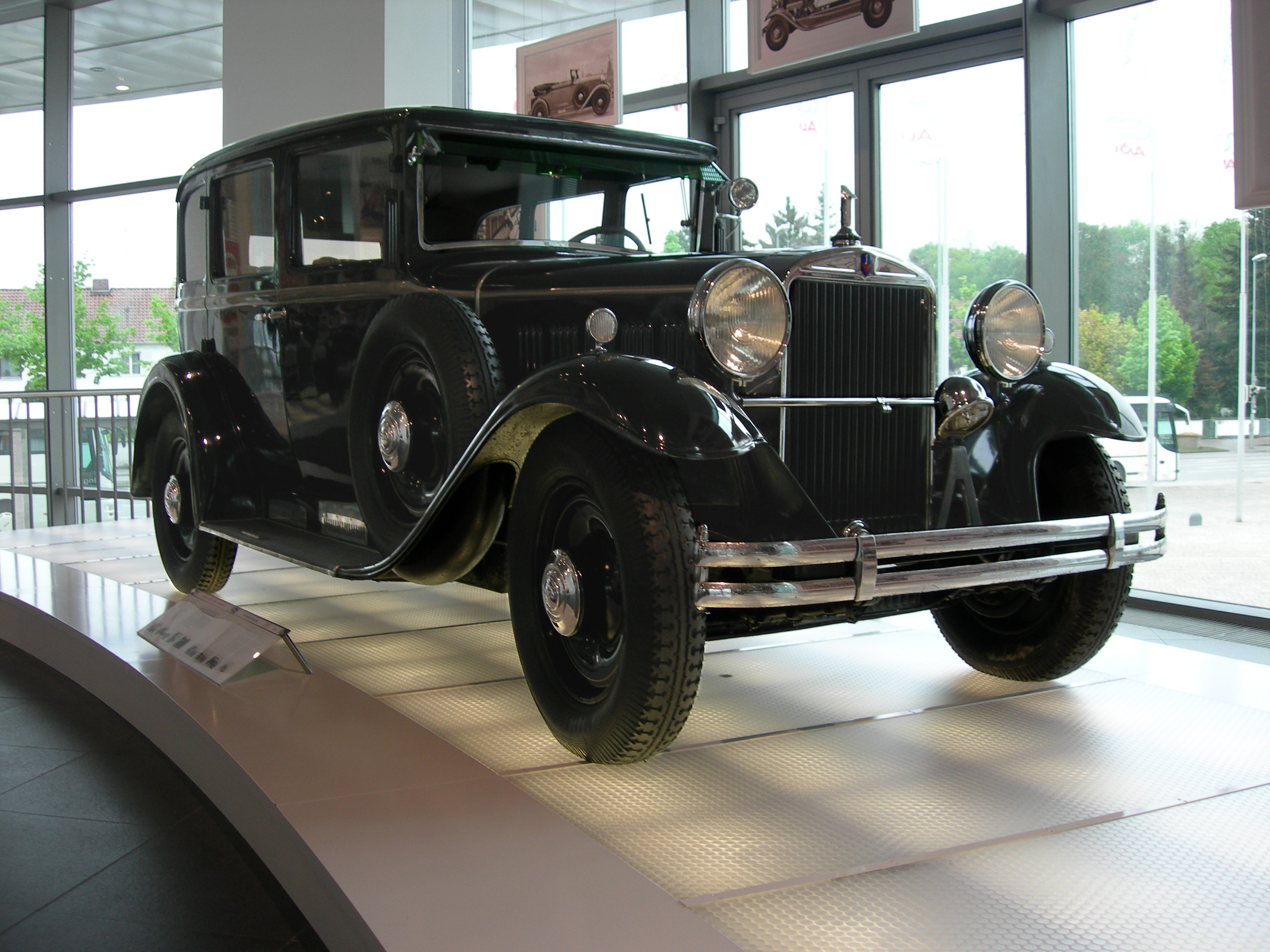

Overview
- Manufacturer: Audi
- Also called: Audi Dresden; Audi 15 / 75
- Production: 1931–1932
- Assembly: Germany

Body and chassis
- Class: Obere Mittelklasse

Powertrain
- Engine: 3838 cc 6-cylinder (design Rickenbacker)

Dimensions
- Wheelbase: 3,100 mm (120 in)
- Length: 4,480 mm (176 in)
- Width: 1,780 mm (70 in)
- Height: 1,760 mm (69 in)

Chronology
- Predecessor: Audi Type R
- Successor: Audi UW 220/UW 225

The Audi Type T was a large, 6-cylinder-powered sedan/saloon car introduced by Audi in 1931. It was in most respects a scaled-down version of the manufacturer's Type SS "Zwickau", which had appeared two years earlier.

Jørgen Skafte Rasmussen, the Danish-born entrepreneurial industrialist who had purchased Audi-Werke in 1928, had previously, in 1927, purchased the manufacturing plant of the bankrupt Detroit-based Rickenbacker business and shipped it home to Germany. He installed it in a factory he owned just outside Zschopau, near to Audi's own Zwickau plant. The plan was to build large, relatively inexpensive US-style engines for sales to other German auto-makers. The plan failed in that Rasmussen failed to secure any orders for the engines, so he instead produced two models of his own which used engines produced using the Rickenbacker plant. The Audi Type T (Zwickau) was the second and smaller of these.

The vehicle had a six-cylinder engine with 3,838 cc of displacement. It developed a maximum output of 75 PS (55 kW; 74 hp) at 3,200 rpm, which was conveyed to the rear wheel through a four-speed manual transmission controlled using a central floor-mounted lever.

The car had two leaf-sprung solid axles and four-wheel hydraulic brakes. It was available as four-door "Limousine" (sedan) or two-door convertible. 76 were made.

== Specifications ==
Production	1931-1932
Engine	6-cylinder, 4-stroke
Bore x stroke	82.55 mm (3.3 in) x 120.65 mm (4.8 in)
Capacity	3838 cc
Power	75 PS (55 kW; 74 hp)
Top speed	100 km/h (62 mph)
Empty weight	1,800 kg (3,968 lb) (chassis)
Electrical	12-volt
Wheelbase	3,100 mm (122.0 in)
Track front/rear	1,440 mm (56.7 in) / 1,480 mm (58.3 in)

== Sources ==
- Oswald, Werner: Deutsche Autos 1920–1945, Motorbuch Verlag Stuttgart, 10. Auflage (1996 edition), ISBN 3-87943-519-7
- Oswald, Werner (2001). Deutsche Autos 1920–1945, Band (vol) 2 (in German). Motorbuch Verlag. ISBN 3-613-02170-6.
