= Audi Type SS =

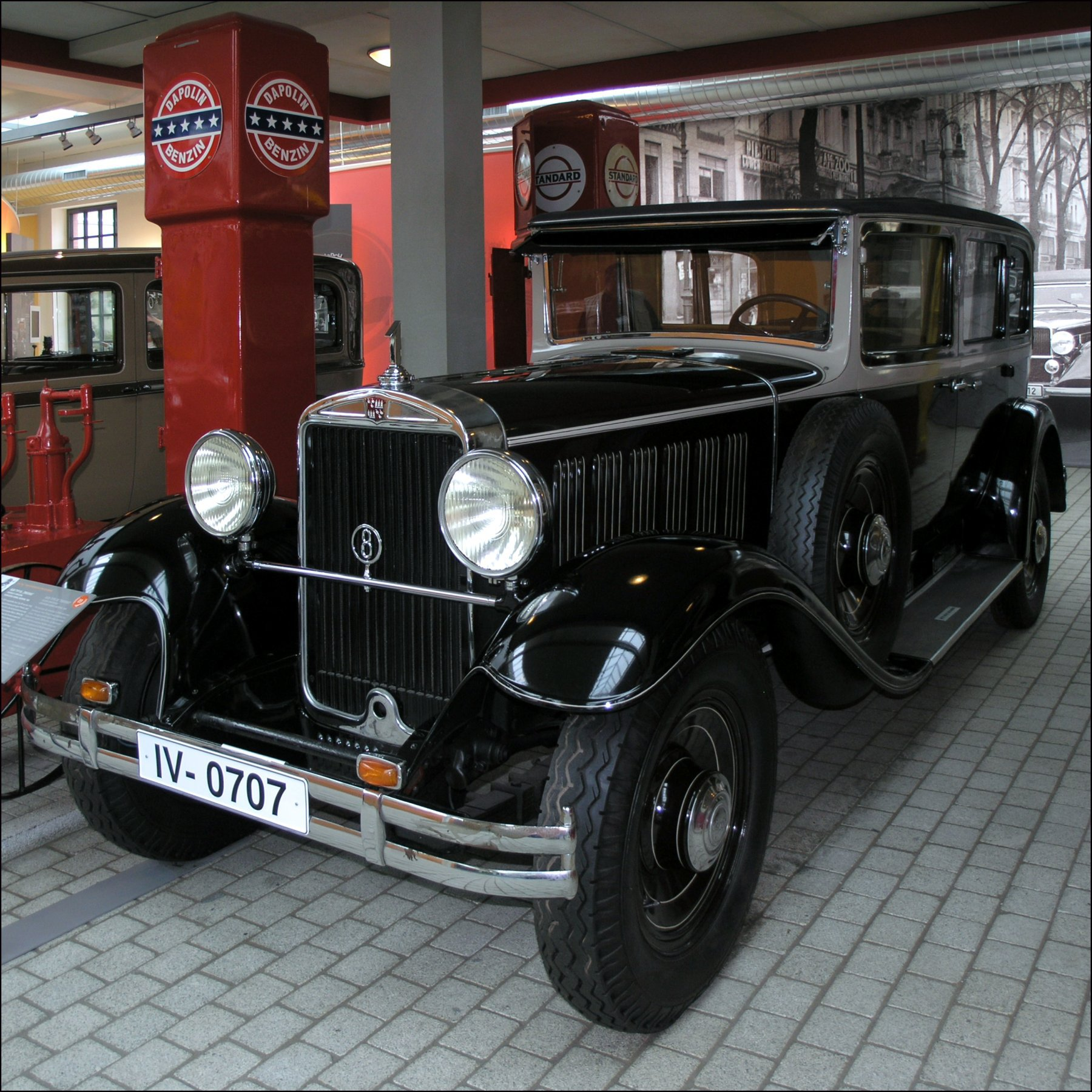

Overview
- Manufacturer: Audi
- Also called: Audi Zwickau; Audi 20 / 100
- Production: 1929–1932
- Assembly: Zwickau, Germany

Body and chassis
- Class: Obere Mittelklasse
- Layout: FR layout

Powertrain
- Engine: 5130 cc 8-cylinder (design Rickenbacker)

Dimensions
- Wheelbase: 3,500 mm (140 in)
- Length: 4,965 mm (195.5 in)
- Width: 1,780 mm (70 in)
- Height: 1,870 mm (74 in)

Chronology
- Predecessor: Audi Type M
- Successor: Audi Type R

The Audi Type SS was a large, eight-cylinder-powered sedan/saloon car introduced by Audi in 1929 in succession to the Type R "Imperator".

Jørgen Skafte Rasmussen, the Danish-born entrepreneurial industrialist who had purchased Audi-Werke in 1928, had previously, in 1927, purchased the manufacturing plant of the bankrupt Detroit-based Rickenbacker business and shipped it home to Germany. He installed it in a factory he owned just outside Zschopau, near to Audi's own Zwickau plant. The plan was to build large, relatively inexpensive US-style "Rasmussen engines" for sales to other German auto-makers. The plan failed in that Rasmussen failed to secure any orders for the engines, so he instead produced a couple of models of his own which used them. The Audi Type SS (Zwickau) was one of these.

The 5,130 cc straight 8 engine developed a maximum output 100 PS (74 kW; 99 hp) at 3,000 rpm, which was relayed using a four-speed transmission through to the rear wheels and converted into a claimed top speed of 110 km/h (68 mph).

The car had two leaf-sprung solid axles and hydraulically controlled brakes which operated on all four wheels. The usual body configurations were available, including a four-door cabriolet and, with a manufacturer's recommended price of 12,950 Marks, a "Pullman-Limousine".

Approximately 400 Audi Zwickaus were produced between 1929 and 1932, which for this size of car was a reasonable tally.

== Specifications ==
Production	1929-1932
Engine	8 Cylinder, 4 Stroke
Bore x Stroke	82.55 mm (3.3 in) x 120.65 mm (4.8 in)
Capacity	5130 cc
Power	100 PS (74 kW; 99 hp)
Top Speed	120 km/h (75 mph)
Empty Weight	2,100 kg (4,630 lb) (Chassis)
Electrical	12 Volt
Wheelbase	3,500 mm (137.8 in)
Track Front/Rear	1,440 mm (56.7 in) / 1,480 mm (58.3 in)

== Sources ==
- Oswald, Werner: Deutsche Autos 1920-1945, Motorbuch Verlag Stuttgart, 10. Auflage (1996), ISBN 3-87943-519-7
- Oswald, Werner (2001). Deutsche Autos 1920-1945, Band (vol) 2 (in German). Motorbuch Verlag. ISBN 3-613-02170-6.
