= Audi Type C =

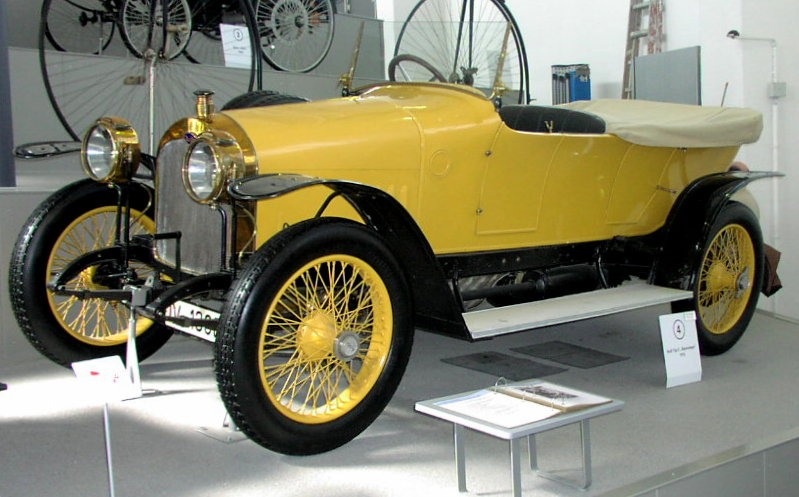

Overview
- Manufacturer: Audi Automobilwerke GmbH Zwickau
- Also called: Audi 14 / 35
- Production: 1912–1921
- Assembly: Germany

Body and chassis
- Layout: RWD

Powertrain
- Engine: 3560 cc 4 cylinder

Chronology
- Successor: Audi Type K

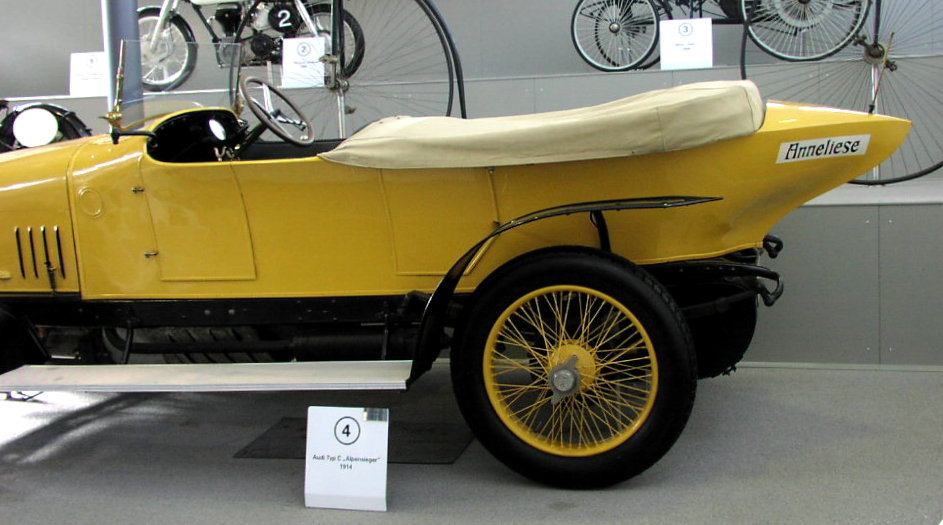
The fashionable "boat deck" style rear end of an Alpine Rally winning Audi Type C

The Audi Type C was introduced in 1912. It became popular with the German people and Army, being brought back into production for a couple of years after the war. Its performance, handling and reliability along with rally successes greatly raised Audi's profile, and the Type C was a commercial success. 1,116 cars were produced.

It featured a four cylinder in-line engine with a displacement of 3,564 cc, with a maximum output of 35 PS (26 kW; 35 hp) at 1800 rpm. The Type C had a maximum speed of 90 km/h (56 mph).

From 1912 through to 1914, the Audi Type C completed the Austrian Alpine Rally, winning in these three successive years. The Austrian Alpine Rally was one of the most competitive motorsport endurance races at the time.
