= Audi Front =

Audi Front UW 220 Audi Front UW 225
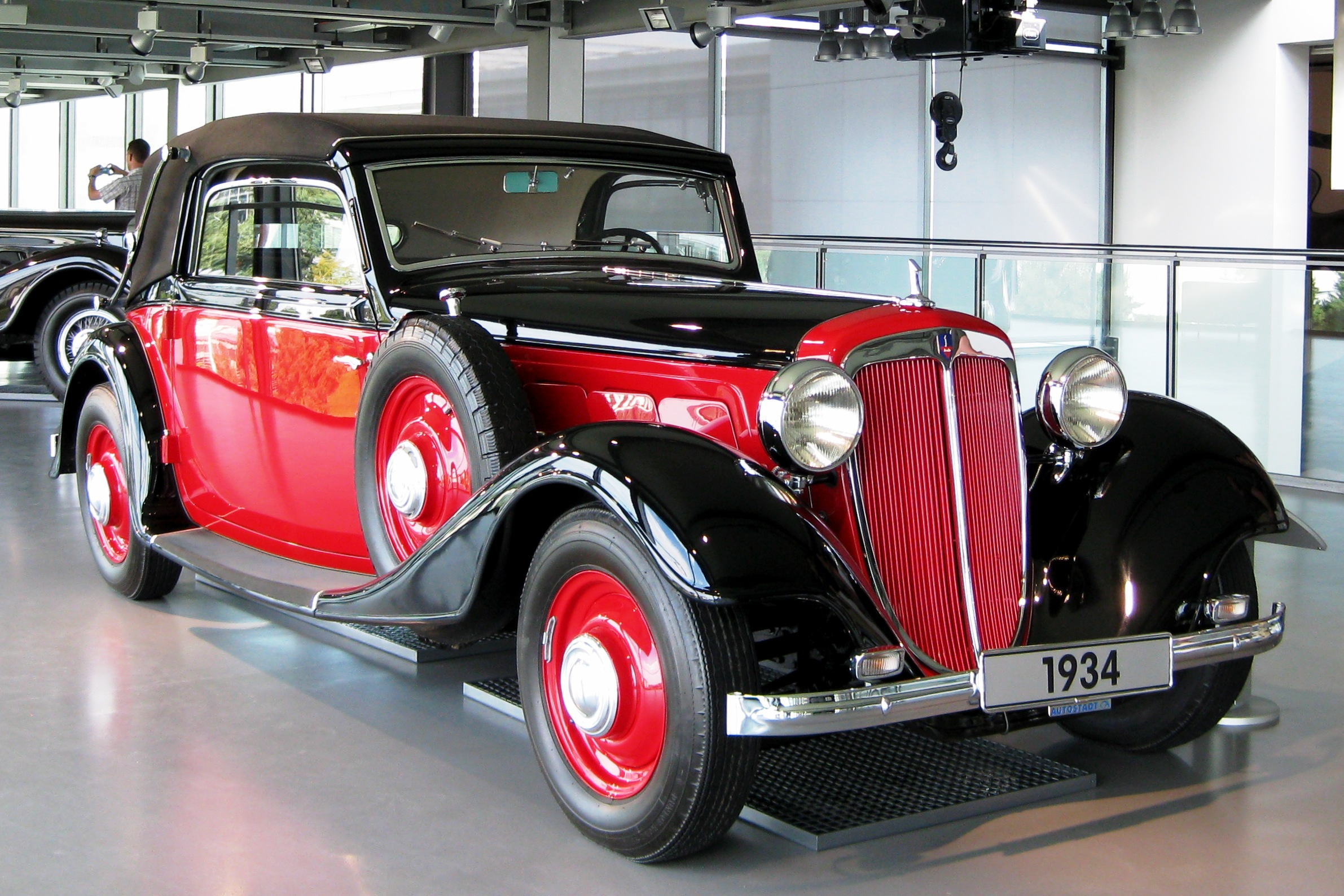
- Audi Front UW 220

Overview
- Manufacturer: Audi-Werke (Auto Union)
- Production: 1933–1934 (UW 220); 1935–1938 (UW 225)
- Assembly: Zwickau, Germany (Horch plant)

Body and chassis
- Class: Obere Mittelklasse
- Related: Wanderer W22

Powertrain
- Engine: 1,950 cc straight-6 2,257 cc straight-6

Dimensions
- Wheelbase: 3,050 mm (120 in): 3,100 mm (120 in)
- Length: 4,375 mm (172.2 in): 4,500 mm (180 in)
- Width: 1,650 mm (65 in)
- Height: 1,575 mm (62.0 in)

Chronology
- Predecessor: Audi Type T
- Successor: Audi 920

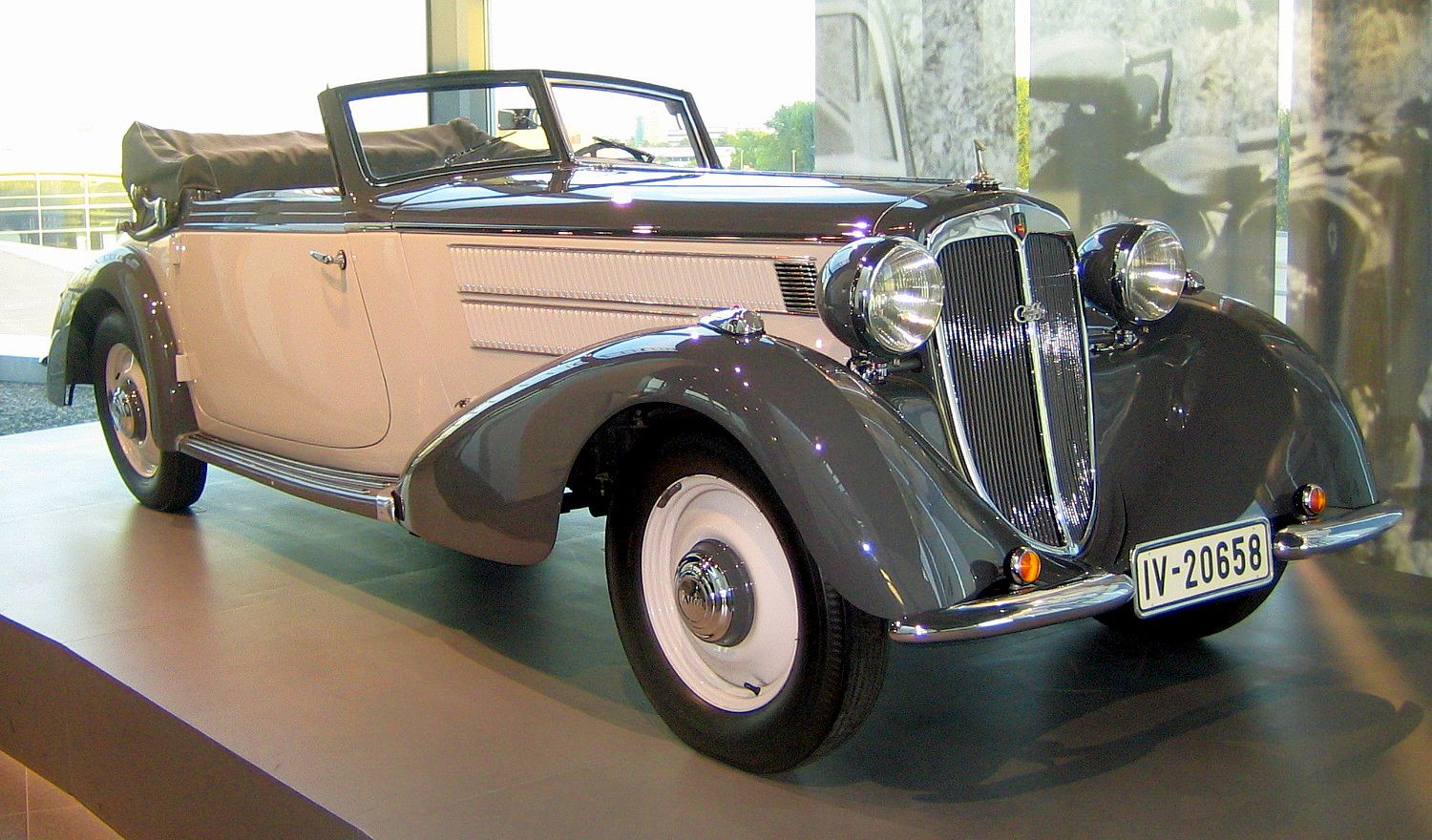
Audi Front UW 225

Initially presented early in 1933, the Audi Front UW 220 was Europe’s first car to combine front-wheel drive with a six-cylinder engine. It remained in production for slightly under two years before being replaced by the Audi Front UW 225 featuring a larger 2.25-litre engine. The larger-engined car introduced in 1935 was built till April 1938 and continued to be listed into 1939. Between 1933 and 1938, the Front was the only Audi in volume production.

== The engine installation ==
At launch the Front UW 220 featured a straight-six-cylinder ohv engine of 1,950 cc. Claimed maximum power output was 40 PS (29 kW; 39 hp) at 3,500 rpm. The two-litre engine was shared with the Auto Union group’s Wanderer W22 introduced at the same time. The letters "UW" in the car's name stood for "Umgekehrter Wanderer" and referred to the fact that it featured a Wanderer engine that had been "umgekehrt" (turned around) through 180 degrees in order to drive wheels which, on this application, were actually ahead of the engine.

== The car ==
In common with many performance cars of the period, the Front UW 220 provided a claimed top speed of 100 km/h (62 mph): presumably actual performance data would have varied according to the weight and wind-cheating qualities of each individual car body. Various body styles were offered, including four-door sports limousines and two-door cabriolets / roadsters. The car was one of the few at its time to have a sloping grille, a feature first popularized by the 1932 Packard Light Eight and later the 1933 Ford.

== 1935 upgrade ==
For the UW 225 produced from 1935, engine size was increased to 2,257 cc, and reported maximum power rose to 50 PS (37 kW; 49 hp) or 55 PS (40 kW; 54 hp), respectively at 3,300 or 3,800 rpm: increased power was reflected by a modest increase in the claimed top speed to 105 km/h (65 mph). The ohv engine came, again, from fellow Auto Union group member Wanderer, being shared with the Wanderer W245 and its successors.

Despite the relative novelty of the front-wheel-drive configuration, the manufacturer quoted the car's turning circle as 12.5 metres (41 ft) which was not greatly above the norm for cars of this size. The rear-wheel-drive Wanderer with which the Audi shared its engine featured an advertised turning circle of 12 meters.

== Manufacturing arrangements ==
Jørgen Skafte Rasmussen who till 1932 owned and controlled the companies that comprised the Auto Union had acquired Audi in 1928, and as part of the deal had acquired their manufacturing plant at Zwickau. However, since 1931 the Audi Zwickau plant had been producing the DKW F1, replaced in 1932 with the DKW F2. The small front-wheel drive DKWs proved popular, and completely utilised the production capacity at what had hitherto been the Audi plant. The Audi Front was therefore assembled at the nearby plant of Horch, another automaker purchased by Rasmussen in 1928, and one which, after Rasmussen's bank enforced a restructuring in 1932, became another of the four Auto Union group companies.

== Commercial ==
Approximately 4,500 Audi Fronts were produced, including 1,817 of the earlier UW 220 model built between April 1933 and November 1934. By 1938 2,591 of the successor UW 225 model had been produced.

== A rear wheel drive "successor" ==
Production of the successor model, the Audi 920, began in November 1938. The Audi 920 was designed to be built and branded as a Horch, and the last minute decision to badge it instead as an Audi was led by marketing considerations. The 920 neatly slotted into the Auto Union range between the larger and more costly Horch models and the slightly smaller cheaper cars produced by Wanderer. Under these circumstances, the description of the rear wheel drive 920 as a replacement for the front wheel drive Audi Front UW 225 is not unchallenged.
