= Audi 920 =

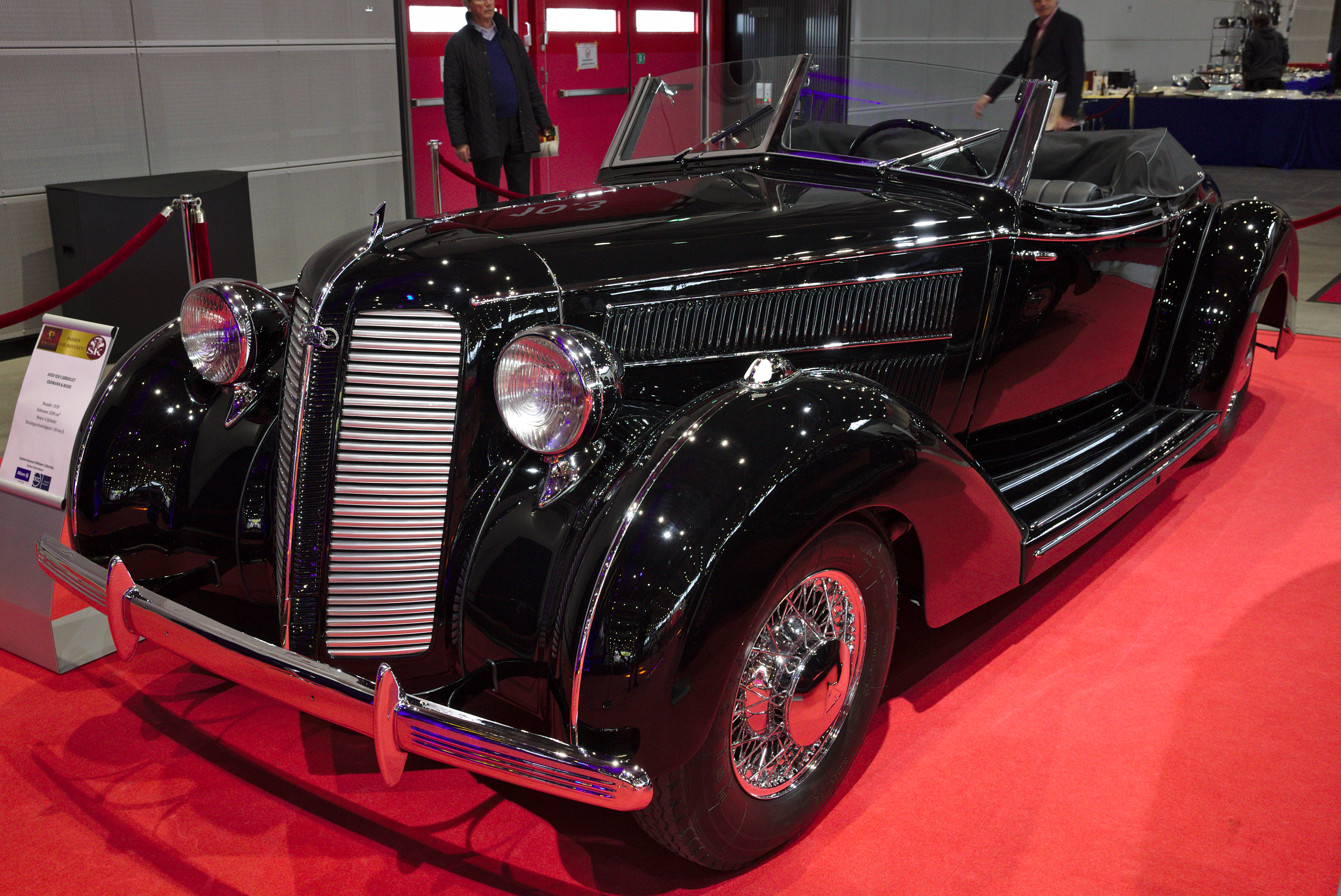
- Audi 920 Cabriolet

Overview
- Manufacturer: Audi (Auto Union)
- Production: 1938–1940
- Assembly: Zwickau, German Reich (Horch plant)

Body and chassis
- Class: Obere Mittelklasse
- Layout: Longitudinal rear-wheel drive

Powertrain
- Engine: 3,281 cc straight-6

Dimensions
- Wheelbase: 3,100–3,290 mm (122–130 in)
- Length: 4,900–5,000 mm (190–200 in)
- Width: 1,720 mm (68 in)
- Kerb weight: 1,640 kg (3,620 lb) (Saloon)

Chronology
- Predecessor: Audi Front UW 225
- Successor: Audi 100

The Audi 920 is a car introduced in 1938 by the Audi division of Auto Union to replace the Audi Front UW 225. Its engine was a shortened version of the eight-cylinder in-line engine used by sister company Horch. The car was planned to occupy a niche in the Auto Union range between the large Horch products and the middle market cars produced by Wanderer. Audi had no stand-alone production facilities at that time and the car was produced, like its predecessor, at the Horch plant.

The 920 featured a front-mounted six-cylinder in-line engine with a displacement of 3,281 cc. A maximum output of 75 PS (55 kW; 74 hp) at 3,000 rpm was claimed along with a maximum speed of 130 km/h (81 mph). A floor-mounted lever controlled the four-speed gearbox: this delivered power to the rear wheels, which represented a technological retreat from the innovative front-wheel drive configuration of the 920's predecessor. The box-section chassis featured semi-independent suspension at the front and a swing-axle arrangement at the rear. The Audi 920 and the British Austin 16 were the only European cars to incorporate design cues from the 1937 Buicks for their front end grille treatment.

Production of almost all passenger cars came to an end in Germany as European war intensified. By the time production of the last pre-war Audi came to an end in 1940, 1,281 of the cars had been produced. The Audi/Horch factories in Zwickau were badly damaged during the war and were seized by the East German government following the partition of Germany - forcing parent company Auto Union to relocate to Ingolstadt, Bavaria – from where the modern-day Audi company ultimately evolved.

It was therefore the last car to carry the Audi name until the Audi F103 in 1965, which marked the resurrection of the brand by Volkswagen shortly after its takeover of Auto Union the previous year. Audi would not market another car in the Obere Mittelklasse class until the Audi 100 came in 1968.

== Gallery ==
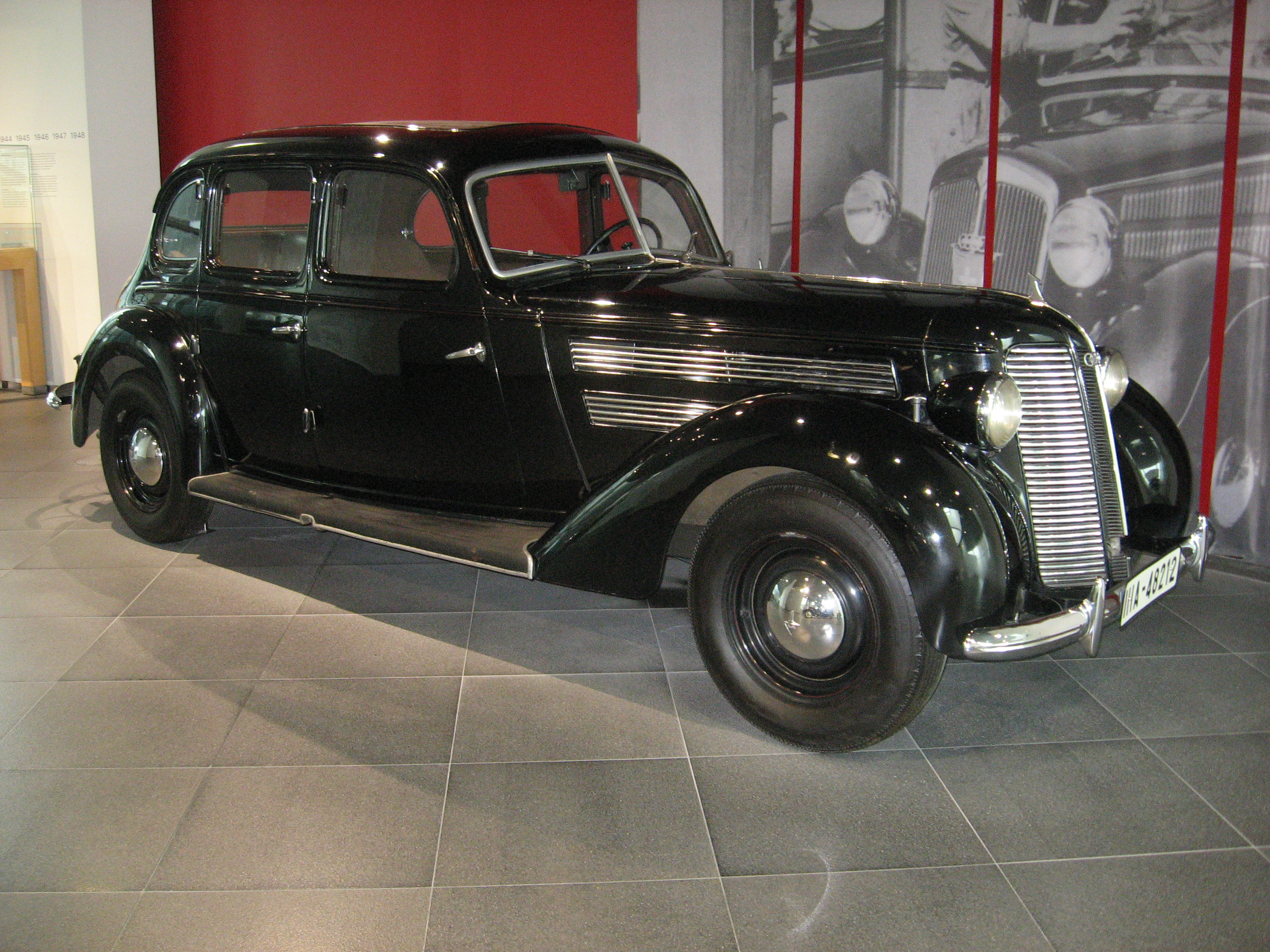
1939 Audi 920 Limousine (4-door sedan)

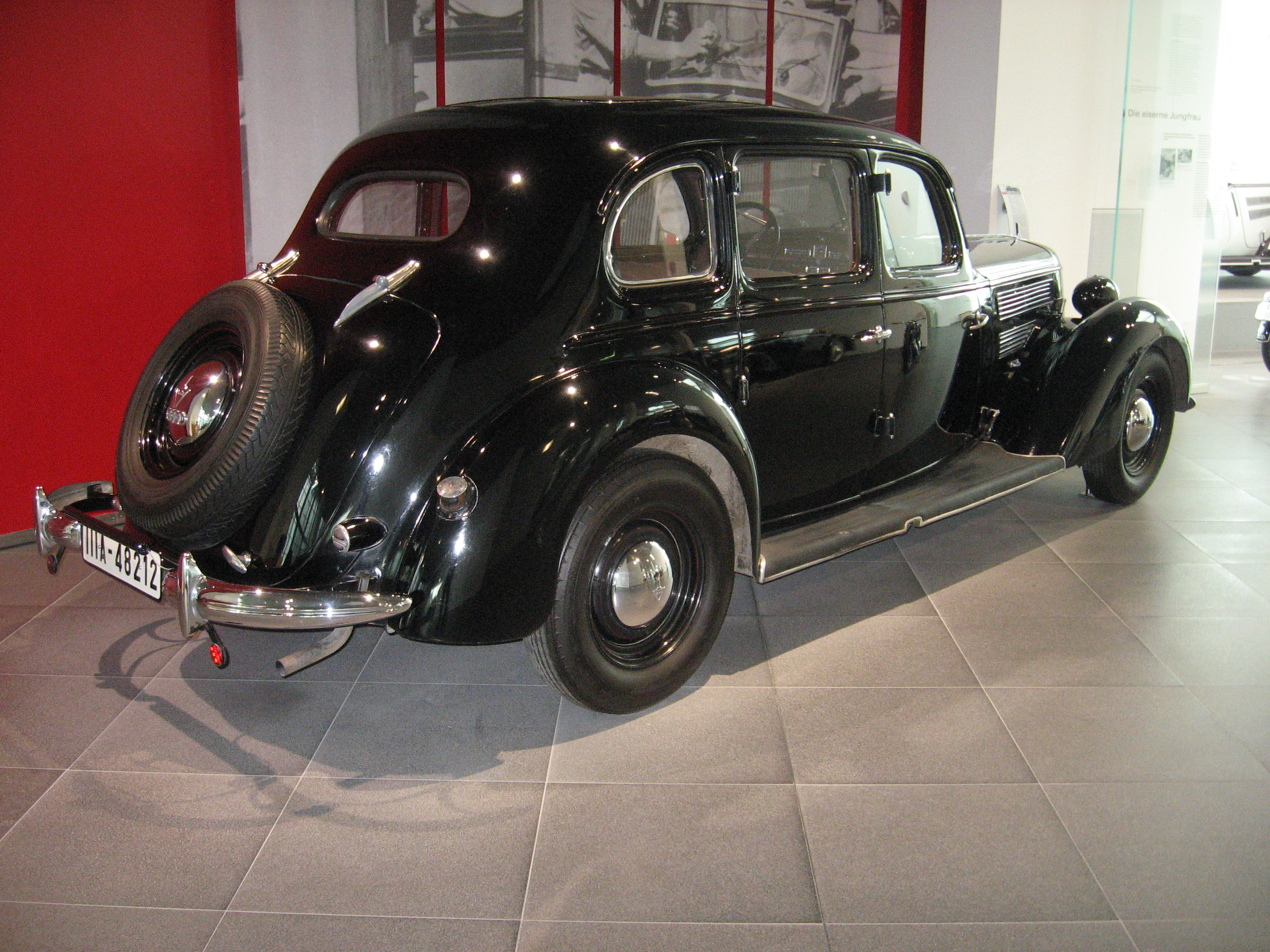
1939 Audi 920 Limousine rear

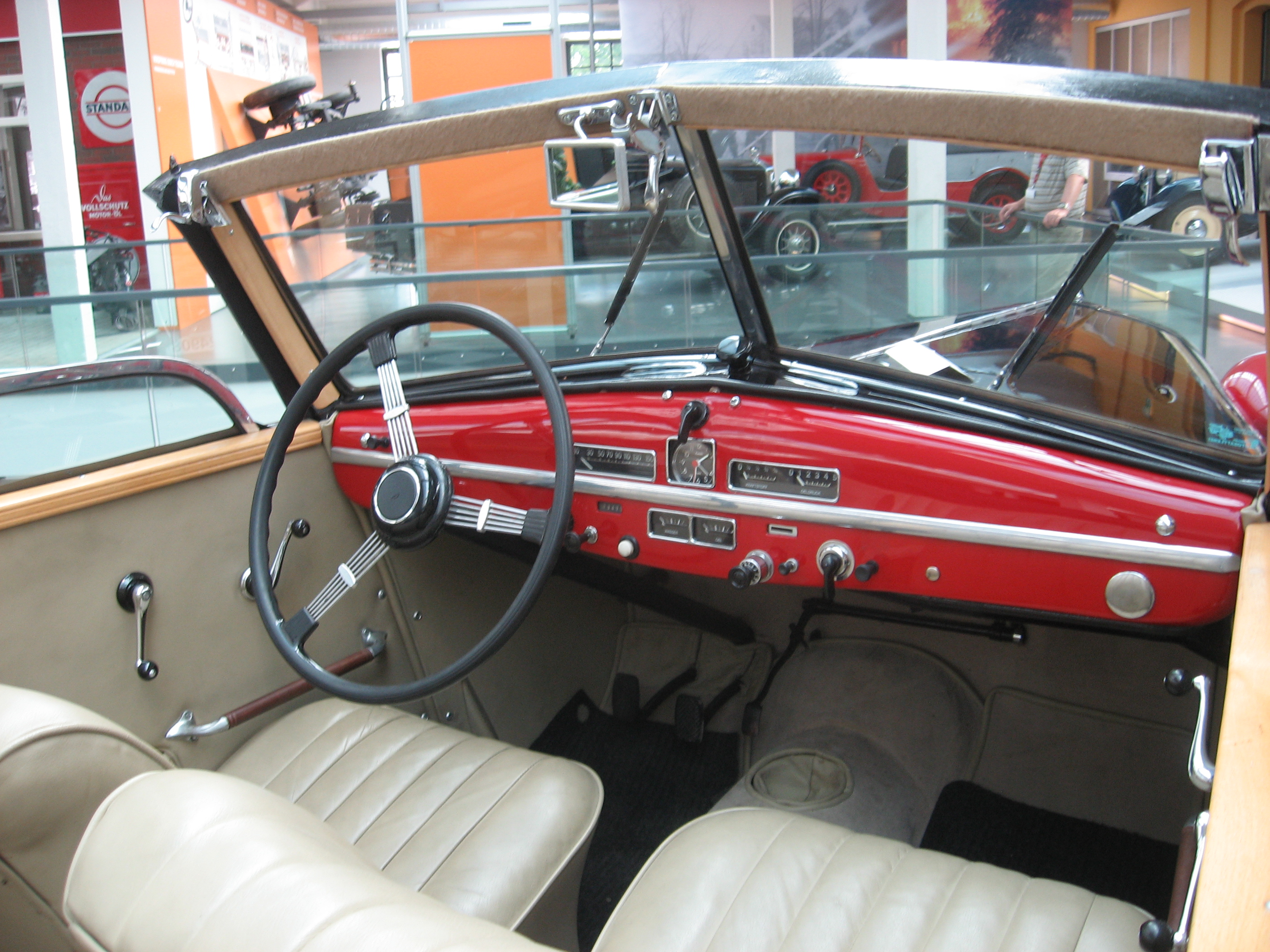
Audi 920 Cabriolet interior
