= Audi Type B =

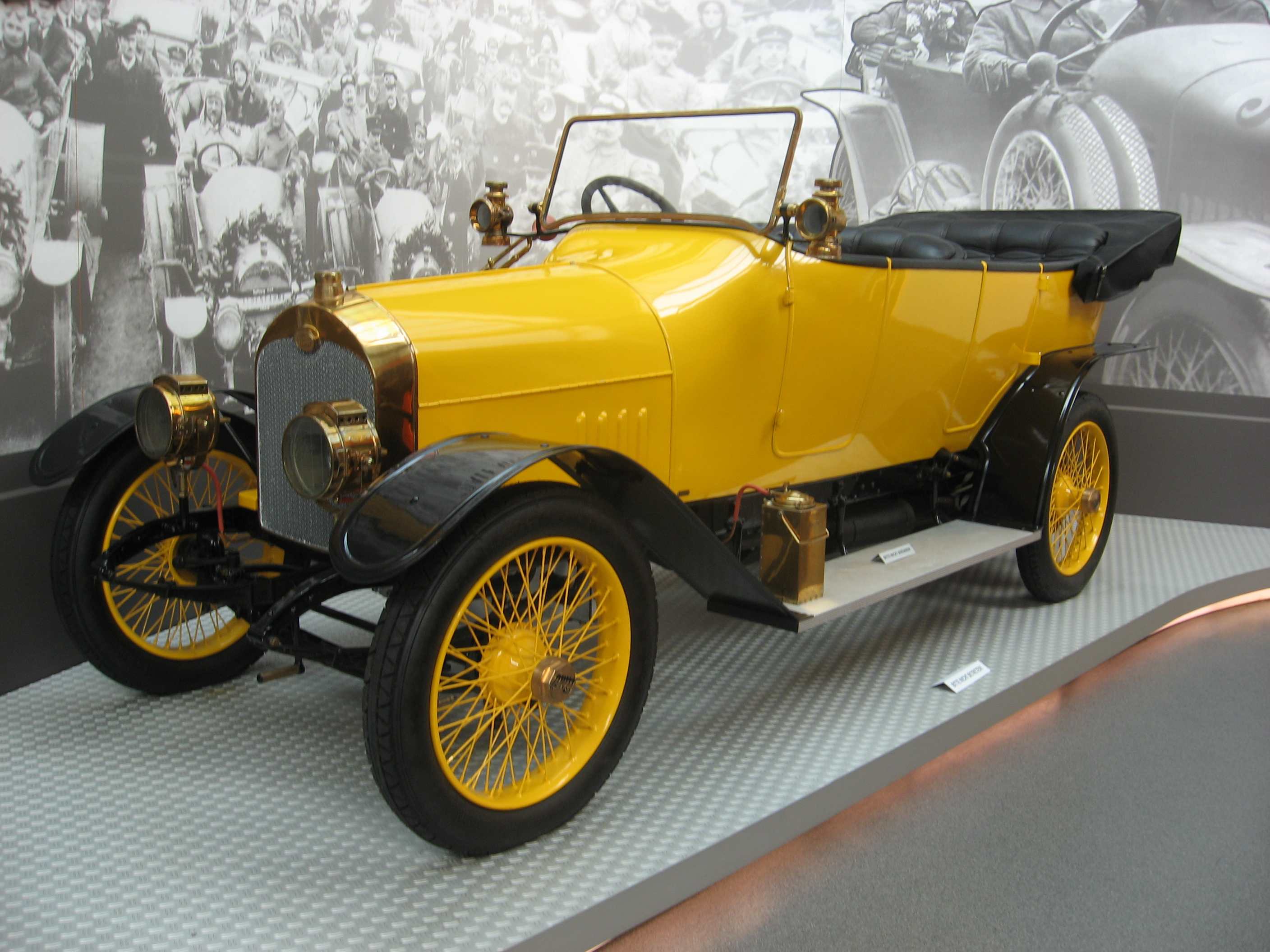
- Audi Typ-B

Overview
- Manufacturer: Audi Automobilwerke GmbH Zwickau
- Production: 1910–1914
- Assembly: Germany

The Audi Type B was introduced in 1910 as a successor to the Audi Type A, there was an overall 360 of the Type B built. It used a four-cylinder, two-block inline engine with 2.6 Litres of displacement. It developed 28 PS (21 kW; 28 hp) through a four-speed countershaft gearbox and a propeller shaft, which drove the rear wheels. The car had a ladder frame and two leaf-sprung solid axles.

== Specifications ==
Production	1910-1914
Engine	4 Cylinder, 4 Stroke
Bore x Stroke	80 mm (3.1 in) x 130 mm (5.1 in)
Displacement	2612 cc
Power	28 PS (21 kW; 28 hp)
Top Speed	75 km/h (47 mph)
Empty Weight	830 kg (1,830 lb) (Chassis)
Wheelbase	2,900–3,050 mm (114.2–120.1 in)
Track Front/Rear	1,300 mm (51.2 in) / 1,300 mm (51.2 in)

== Sources ==
- Schrader, Halwart: Deutsche Autos 1885-1920, Motorbuch Verlag Stuttgart, 1. Auflage (2002), ISBN 3-613-02211-7
- Werner Oswald: Alle Audi Automobile 1910-1980, Motorbuch Verlag Stuttgart, 1. Auflage (1980), ISBN 3-87943-685-1
