= Audi Type A =

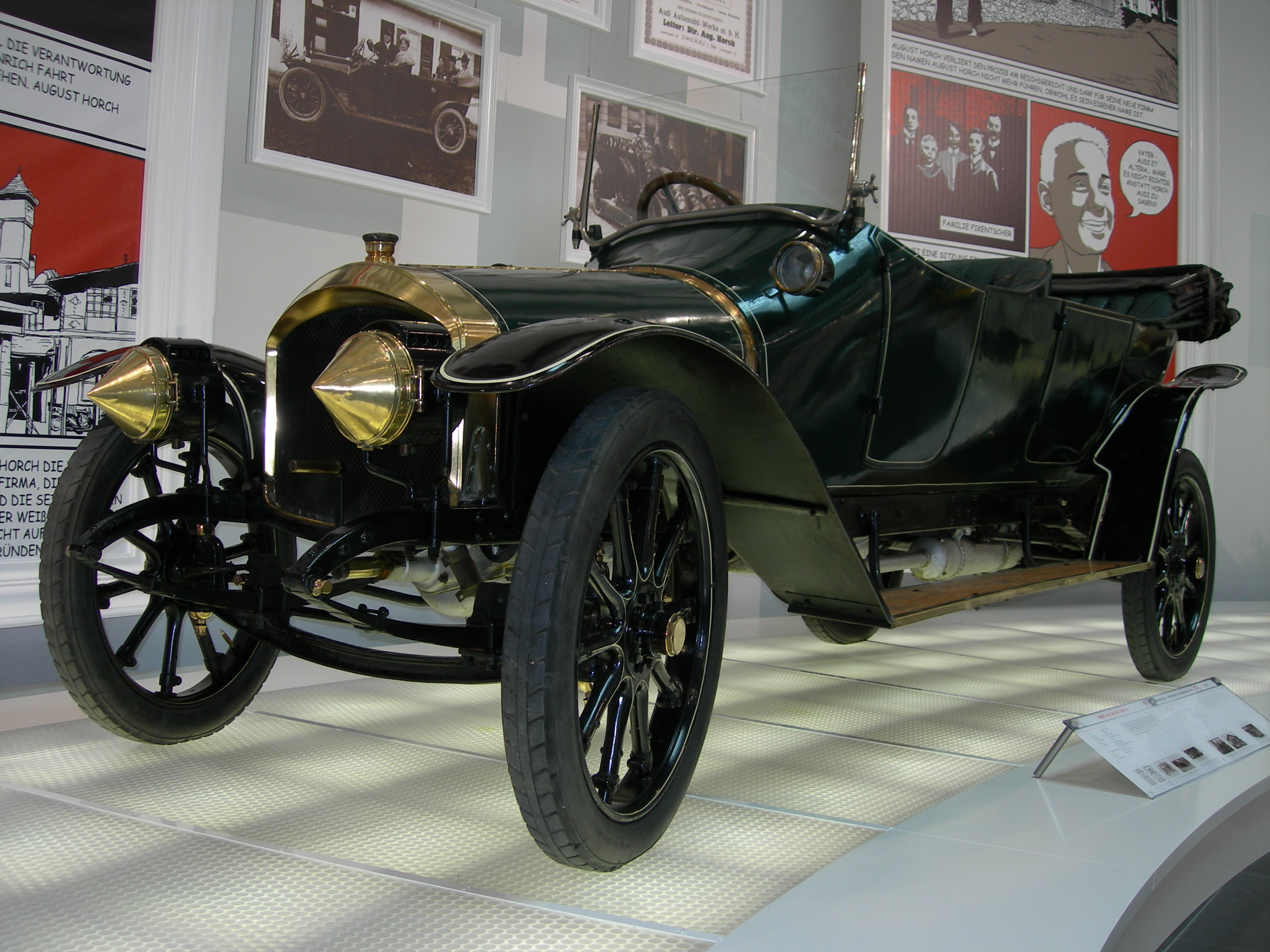

Overview
- Manufacturer: Audi Automobilwerke GmbH Zwickau
- Production: 1910–1912
- Assembly: Germany

Chronology
- Successor: Audi Type B

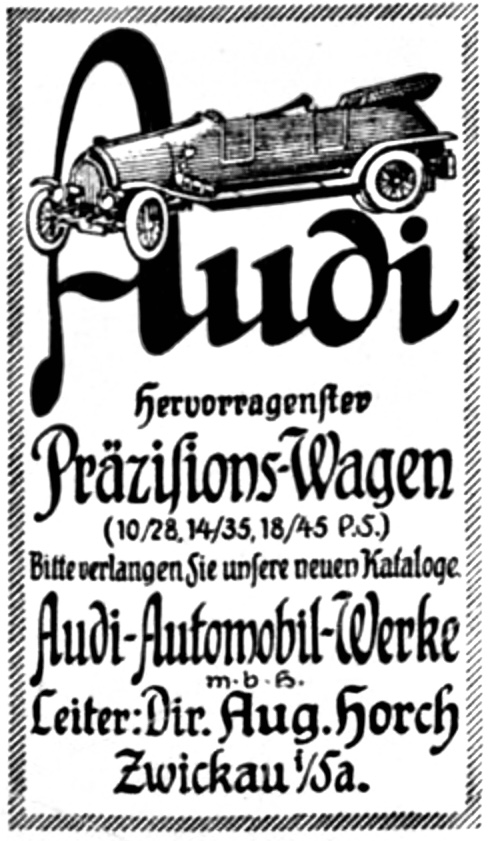
Audi advertisement Type A,B,C,D (1912)

The Audi Type A is an automobile which was introduced in 1910. It is considered to be the oldest vehicle under the Audi name. A total of 140 vehicles were produced. In 1911 the type A was succeeded by the Audi Type B.

== Specifications ==
| Production | 1910–1912 |
| Engine | 4 Cylinder, 4 Stroke |
| Bore x Stroke | 80 mm x 130 mm |
| Displacement | 2612 cc |
| Power (PS) | 22 |
| Top Speed | 75 km/h |
| Empty Weight | 830 kg (Chassis) |
| Wheelbase | 2900 – 3050 mm |
| Track Front/Rear | 1300 mm / 1300 mm |

== Sources ==
- Werner Oswald: Alle Audi Automobile 1910-1980, Motorbuch Verlag Stuttgart, 1. Auflage (1980), ISBN 3-87943-685-1
