= Audi Type R =

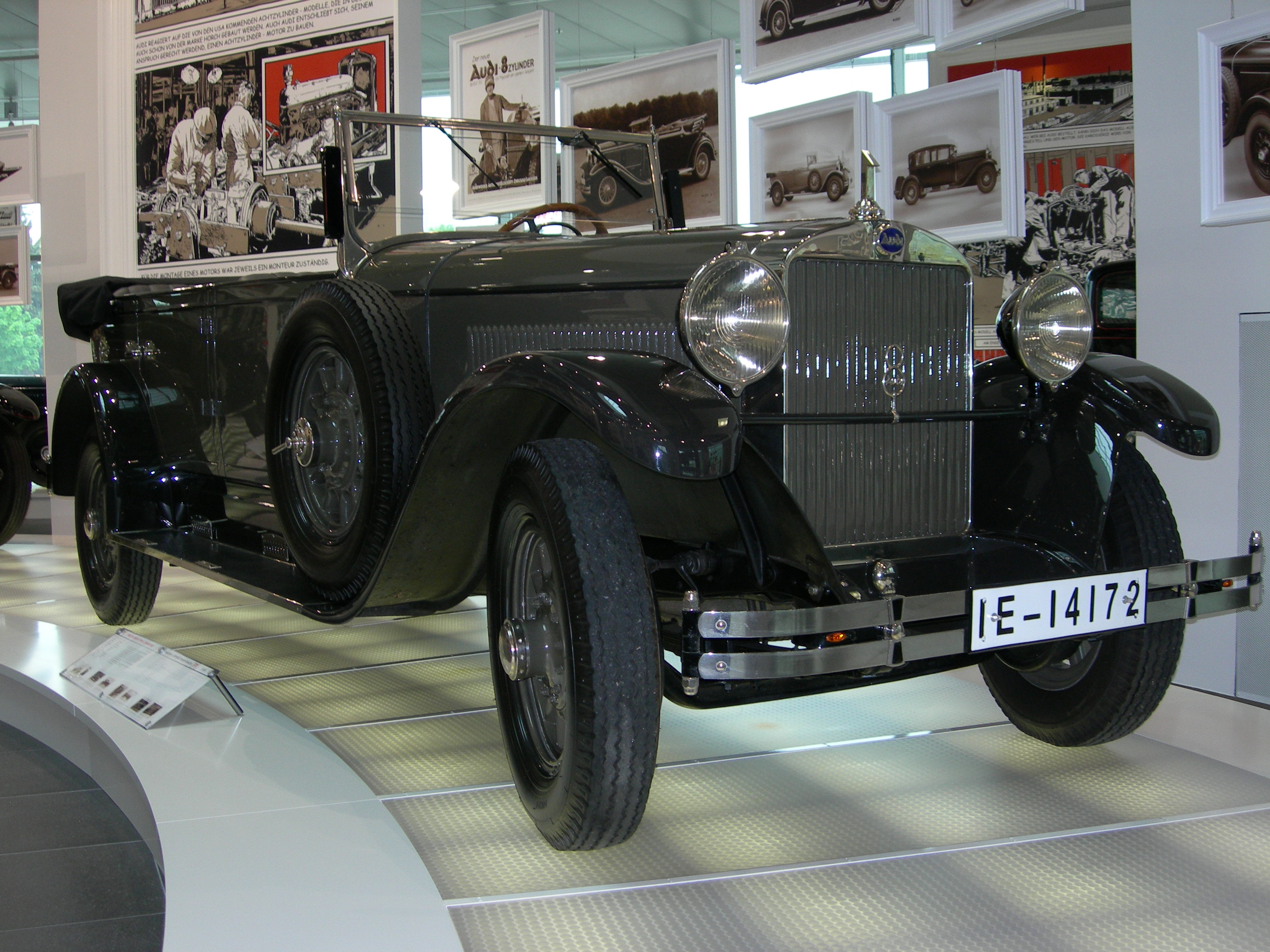

Overview
- Manufacturer: Audi
- Also called: Audi Imperator; Audi 19 / 100 (reflecting tax horsepower / actual horsepower)
- Production: 1928–1932; Max ca. 150 produced
- Assembly: Zwickau, Germany

Body and chassis
- Class: Obere Mittelklasse
- Layout: FR

Powertrain
- Engine: 4,872 cc straight-8

Dimensions
- Wheelbase: 3,620 mm (143 in)

Chronology
- Predecessor: Audi Type M
- Successor: Audi Type T

The Audi Type R was a large car produced by Audi between 1928 and 1932 as a successor to the Audi Type M.

The Type R closely resembled the predecessor model, which had been perceived as too expensive. In reality the Type R was a little smaller than the Type M, its specification was less lavish and its price was lower. Nevertheless, it remained a large, expensive car produced during a period characterised by increasing austerity as the economy underwent the aftershocks from the stock market crashes and bank failures of 1929. Like its even more extravagant predecessor the Type R struggled to find customers.

The car had an eight-cylinder in-line sidevalve engine with 4,872 cc of displacement. It developed a claimed maximum 100 PS (74 kW; 99 hp) of output at 3,300 rpm, which converted into a top speed of 120 km/h (75 mph). Gone were the light-metal cylinder head and overhead valves that had excited commentators on the Type M. The three-speed manual transmission represented a step back from the four-speed transmission of the earlier car, and while the Type R retained four-wheel brakes, these were now mechanically rather than hydraulically controlled.

The Type R also lost some of the earlier car's bulk, its 3,620 mm (143 in) wheelbase being 130 mm (5.1 in) shorter than that of the Type M. The vast Pullmann-Limousine-bodied car was also 200 kg lighter, with an official weight of "only" 2,300 kg. Particularly noteworthy was the price of the Pullmann-Limousine-bodied car, with a manufacturer's listed price of 16,575 Marks, a significant cut when compared to the 22,300 Marks that had been asked four years earlier for the then newly introduced Type M, although it should be borne in mind that there was more general price deflation recorded in the German economy between 1928 and 1932.

The Type R was much more efficient and less expensive than its predecessor, but it still found few buyers. 145 were eventually produced. Audi could not survive on these volumes and was running out of cash; purchase of the Audi business by Jørgen Skafte Rasmussen in 1928 came as a timely rescue.

== Specifications ==
Production	1928-1932
Engine	8 Cylinder, 4 Stroke
Bore x Stroke	80 mm (3.1 in) x 122 mm (4.8 in)
Capacity	4872 cc
Power	100 PS (74 kW; 99 hp)
Top Speed	120 km/h (75 mph)
Empty Weight	2,300 kg (5,071 lb) (Chassis)
Electrical	12 Volt
Wheelbase	3,620 mm (142.5 in)
Track Front/Rear	1,540 mm (60.6 in)/1,450 mm (57.1 in)

== Sources ==
- Oswald, Werner: Deutsche Autos 1920-1945, Motorbuch Verlag Stuttgart, 10. Auflage (1996 edition), ISBN 3-87943-519-7
- Oswald, Werner (2001). Deutsche Autos 1920-1945, Band (vol) 2 (in German). Motorbuch Verlag. ISBN 3-613-02170-6.
