= Audi Type K =

Overview
- Manufacturer: Audi-Werke
- Also called: Audi 14 / 50
- Production: 1922–1925
- Assembly: Zwickau, Germany

Body and chassis
- Class: Obere Mittelklasse
- Layout: FR layout

Powertrain
- Engine: 3,560 cc straight-4
- Transmission: 4-speed manual

Dimensions
- Wheelbase: 3,530 mm (139 in)

Chronology
- Successor: Audi Type M

The Audi Type K was a car introduced by Audi at the Berlin Motor Show in September 1921. Since the end of the war Audi had till now produced only cars of pre-war design, so that the Type K was the first post-war Audi design to be offered. The Type K entered production in 1922 and was withdrawn in 1925, by which time the company had commenced production, in 1924, their Type M model which can be seen as a larger replacement for the Type K. The Audi Type K was the first volume produced car in Germany to feature left-hand drive.

In retrospect the car has been seen as one of the most technically advanced cars of its time. It had a four-cylinder in-line engine with 3.6 litres of displacement, incorporating an aluminium cylinder block with replaceable cylinder liners (eingepressten Laufbuchsen). It developed a maximum of 50 PS (37 kW; 49 hp) at 2200 rpm, which was transmitted to the rear wheels, using a four-speed transmission. Claimed top speed was 95 km/h (59 mph).

The car had two leaf-sprung solid axles. It was available as a four-seat touring car, four-door sedan or as a two-door coupé-cabriolet. The production volume as "not more than approx 750".

== Specification ==
| Production | 1922-1925 |
| Engine | 4 Cylinder, 4 Stroke |
| Bore x Stroke | 90 mm (3.5 in) x 140 mm (5.5 in) |
| Capacity | 3560 cc |
| Power | 50 PS (37 kW; 49 hp) |
| Top Speed | 95 km/h (59 mph) |
| Empty Weight | 1,400 kg (3,100 lb) (Chassis) |
| Wheelbase | 3,530 mm (139.0 in) |
| Track Front/Rear | 1,450 mm (57.1 in)/1,450 mm (57.1 in) |

== Sources ==
=== Works cited ===
- Oswald, Werner: Deutsche Autos 1920–1945, Motorbuch Verlag Stuttgart, 10. Auflage (1996), ISBN 3-87943-519-7
- Oswald, Werner [in German] (2001a). Deutsche Autos [German Cars] (in German). Vol. Band [Volume] 2: 1920–1945. Stuttgart: Motorbuch Verlag. ISBN 3-613-02170-6.
