= Audi Type D =

Overview
- Manufacturer: Audi Automobilwerke GmbH Zwickau (from 1915 Audi Werke Zwickau)
- Production: 1912–1920
- Assembly: Germany

The Audi Type D was introduced in 1911. The vehicle had a four-cylinder in-line engine with 4.7 litres of displacement. It developed 45 PS over a four-speed countershaft gearbox and a propeller shaft, which drove the rear wheels. The car had a ladder frame and two leaf-sprung solid axles. The Type D was available as a four-seat touring car or four-door sedan. Until 1920, only 53 copies of the car were built.

== Sources ==
- Schrader, Halwart: Deutsche Autos 1885-1920, Motorbuch Verlag Stuttgart, 1. Auflage (2002), ISBN 3-613-02211-7
