= Audi Type M =

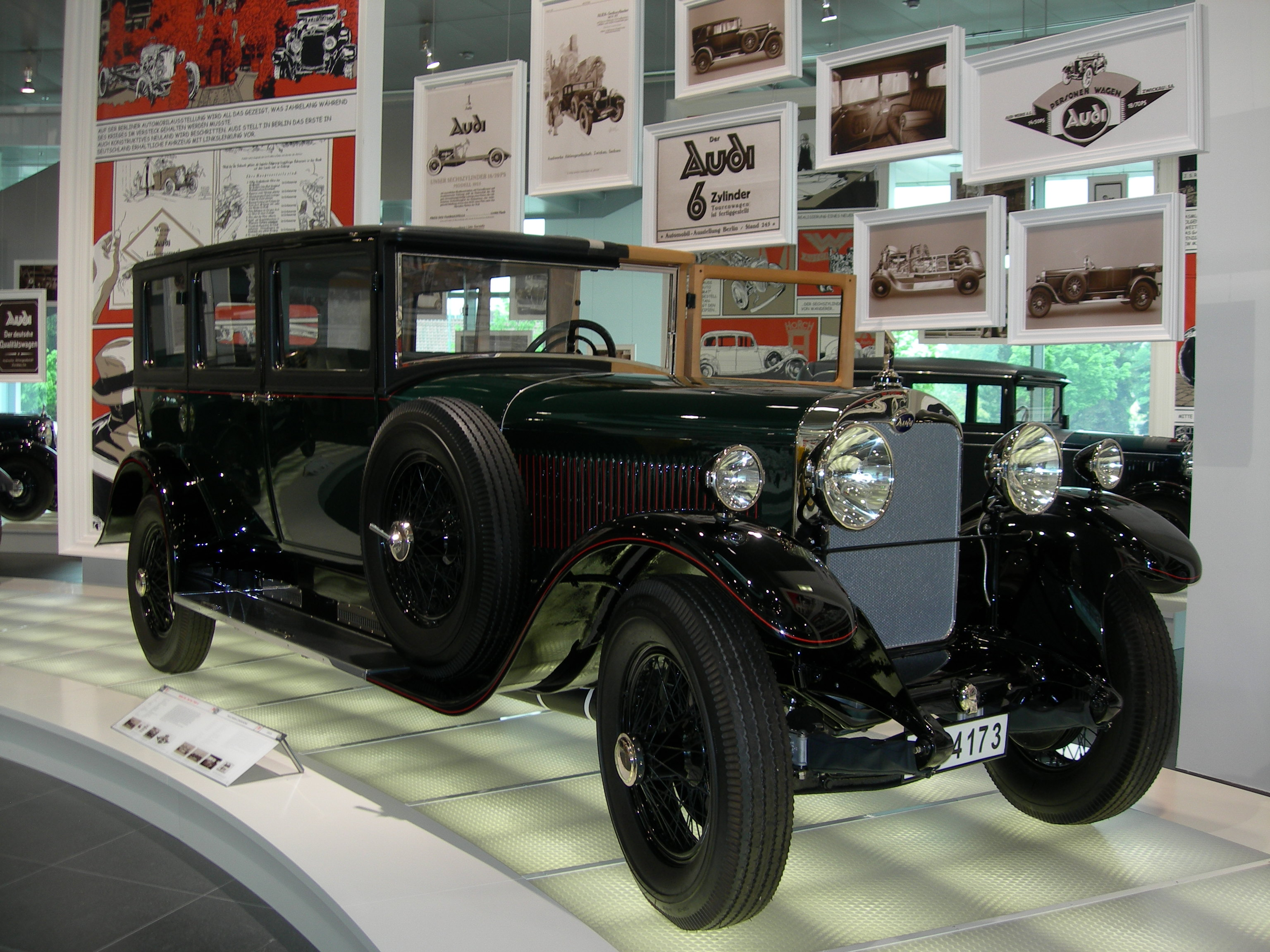

Overview
- Manufacturer: Audi-Werke
- Also called: Audi 18/70
- Production: 1924–1928
- Assembly: Zwickau, Germany

Body and chassis
- Class: Obere Mittelklasse
- Layout: FR

Dimensions
- Wheelbase: 3,750 mm (148 in)

Chronology
- Predecessor: Audi Type K
- Successor: Audi Type R

The Audi Type M was a large car first presented at the Berlin Motor Show in 1923. It was developed by Erich Horn and produced by Audi between 1924 and 1928.

The vehicle had a six-cylinder in-line engine with 4,655 cc of displacement. The engine incorporated several innovative features, including overhead valves. It developed a maximum of 70 PS (51 kW; 69 hp) at 3,000 rpm. The engine had an eight-bearing crankshaft, with an early form of an intake air cleaning system, an elaborate system in which air passed through an oil-wetted filter in the lower part of the crankcase; the airflow was then pre-heated by the exhaust system, settled to eliminate turbulence, and supplied to the carburetor. Power was transmitted to the rear wheels through a four-speed transmission. The car had two leaf-sprung solid axles and four wheel hydraulic brakes; it one of the first German-made automobiles with hydraulic brakes, and the first Audi with four-wheel brakes.

The Type M's first presentation, at the 1923 Berlin Motor Show, was accompanied by a press release which boasted that "Audi is one of those German automakers that believes doing the job properly is more important than price" („Die Audi-Werke zählen zu jenen deutschen Automobilfabriken, welche die Preisfrage hinter die konstruktive Aufgabe zurückstellen“). This approach may have helped to win the car more admirers, but paying customers were harder to find. The Type M came with a manufacturer's recommended retail price of 22,300 RM for a large six-light "Pullman-Limousine" bodied vehicle. The car was expensive and reportedly brought Audi very close to bankruptcy. 228 were produced, plus two prototypes.

== Specifications ==
Production	1924-1928
Engine	6 Cylinder, 4 Stroke
Bore x Stroke	90 mm (3.5 in) x 122 mm (4.8 in)
Capacity	4655 cc
Power	70 PS (51 kW; 69 hp)
Top Speed	120 km/h (75 mph)
Empty Weight	2,500 kg (5,512 lb) (Chassis)
Electrical	12 Volt
Wheelbase	3,750 mm (147.6 in)
Track Front/Rear	1,450 mm (57.1 in) / 1,450 mm (57.1 in)

== Works cited ==
- Oswald, Werner (1979). Deutsche Autos 1920-1945, Band (vol) 2 (in German). Stuttgart: Motorbuch Verlag. ISBN 3-87943-519-7.
- Kirchberg, Peter; Erdmann, Thomas; Plagmann, Ralph (1997). A History of Progress – Chronicle of the Audi AG (2nd ed.). Ingolstadt: Audi AG – via Internet Archive.
