= Audi Type G =

Overview
- Manufacturer: Audi-Werke
- Production: 1914–1923
- Assembly: Zwickau, Germany

Body and chassis
- Layout: FR layout

Powertrain
- Engine: 2,084 cc straight-4
- Transmission: 4-speed manual

Dimensions
- Wheelbase: 2,995 mm (117.9 in)

The Audi Type G is a passenger car produced by Audi between 1914 and 1923. It is Audi's smallest and least powerful pre-war car.

The vehicle had a four-cylinder two-block in-line engine with 2,084 cc of displacement with which developed a maximum of 22 PS (16 kW; 22 hp) at 1900 rpm. Power was transmitted to the rear wheels through a four-speed countershaft gearbox and a steel propeller shaft. A top speed of 65 km/h (40 mph) was claimed. The mechanical foot brake worked directly on the propeller shaft. The car had a ladder frame and two leaf-sprung solid axles. It was available as a sports two-seater.

1,122 Type G Audis were built, making this the biggest selling Audi prior to the creation, in 1932, of the Auto Union.

== Specifications ==
Production	1914-1923
Engine	4 Cylinder, 4 Stroke
Bore x Stroke	75 mm (3.0 in) x 118 mm (4.6 in)
Capacity	2084 cc
Power (PS)	22 PS (16 kW; 22 hp)
Top Speed	65 km/h (40 mph)
Empty Weight	1,250 kg (2,760 lb) (Chassis)
Wheelbase	2,995 mm (117.9 in)
Track Front/Rear	1,250 mm (49.2 in) / 1,250 mm (49.2 in)

== Sources ==
- Oswald, Werner (1990). Deutsche Autos 1920-1945 alle deutschen Personenwagen der damaligen Zeit. ISBN 978-3-87943-519-7.
- Oswald, Werner (2001). Deutsche Autos 1920-1945, Band 2 (in German). Motorbuch Verlag. ISBN 3-613-02170-6.
