= E-segment =

Car size classification in Europe

2024 best-selling E-segment cars

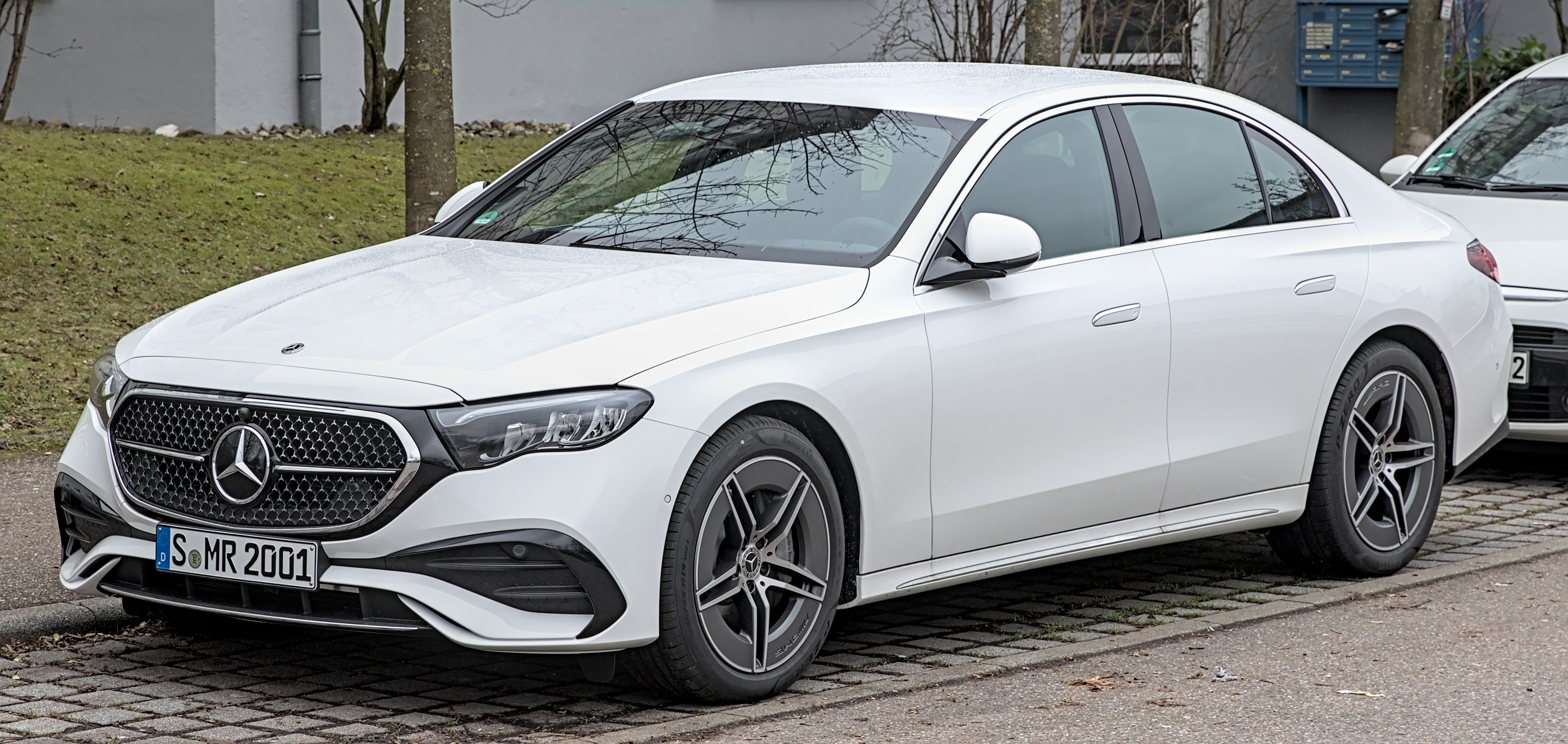
Mercedes-Benz E-Class
6th generation (2023-present)

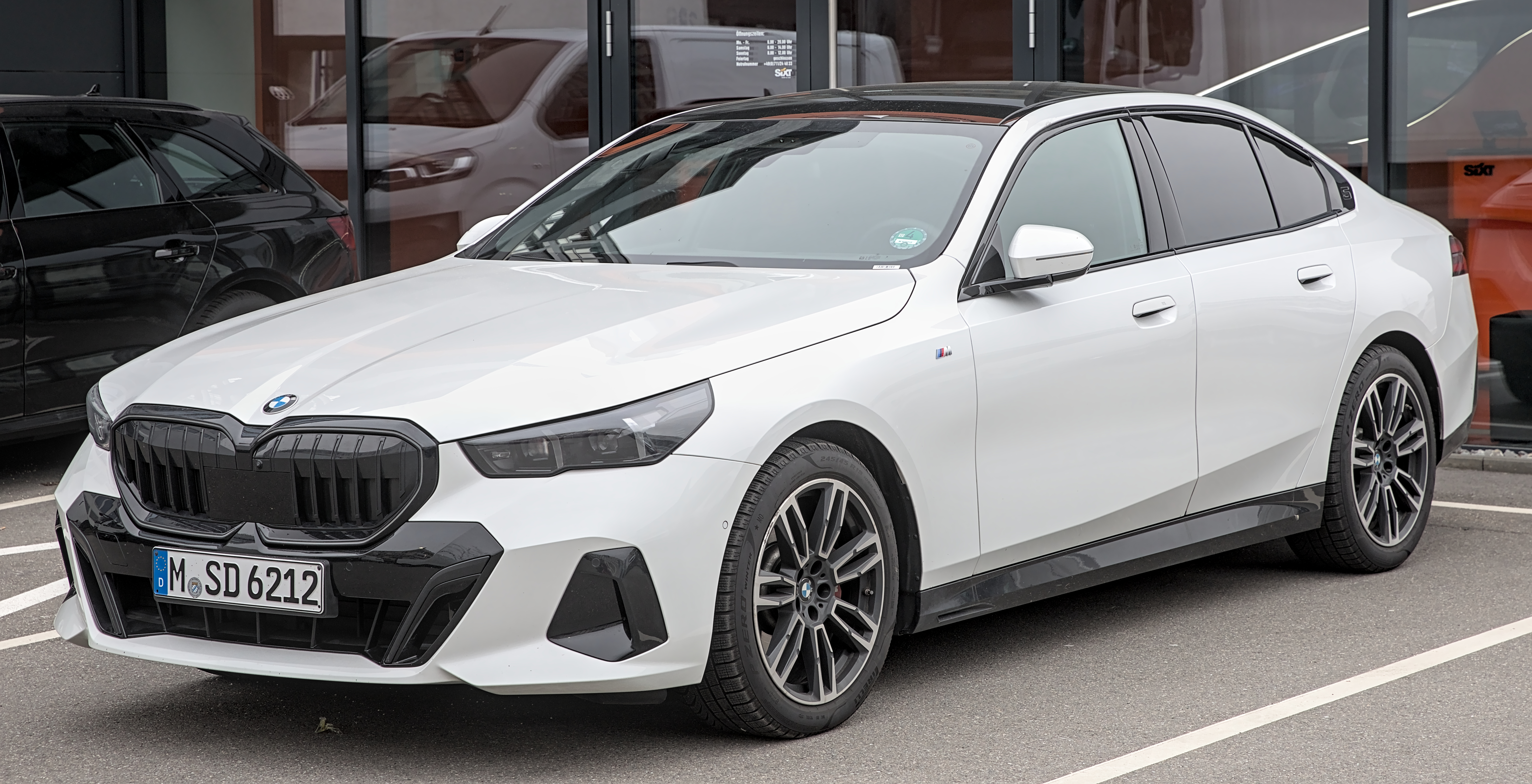
BMW 5 Series
8th generation (2024-present)

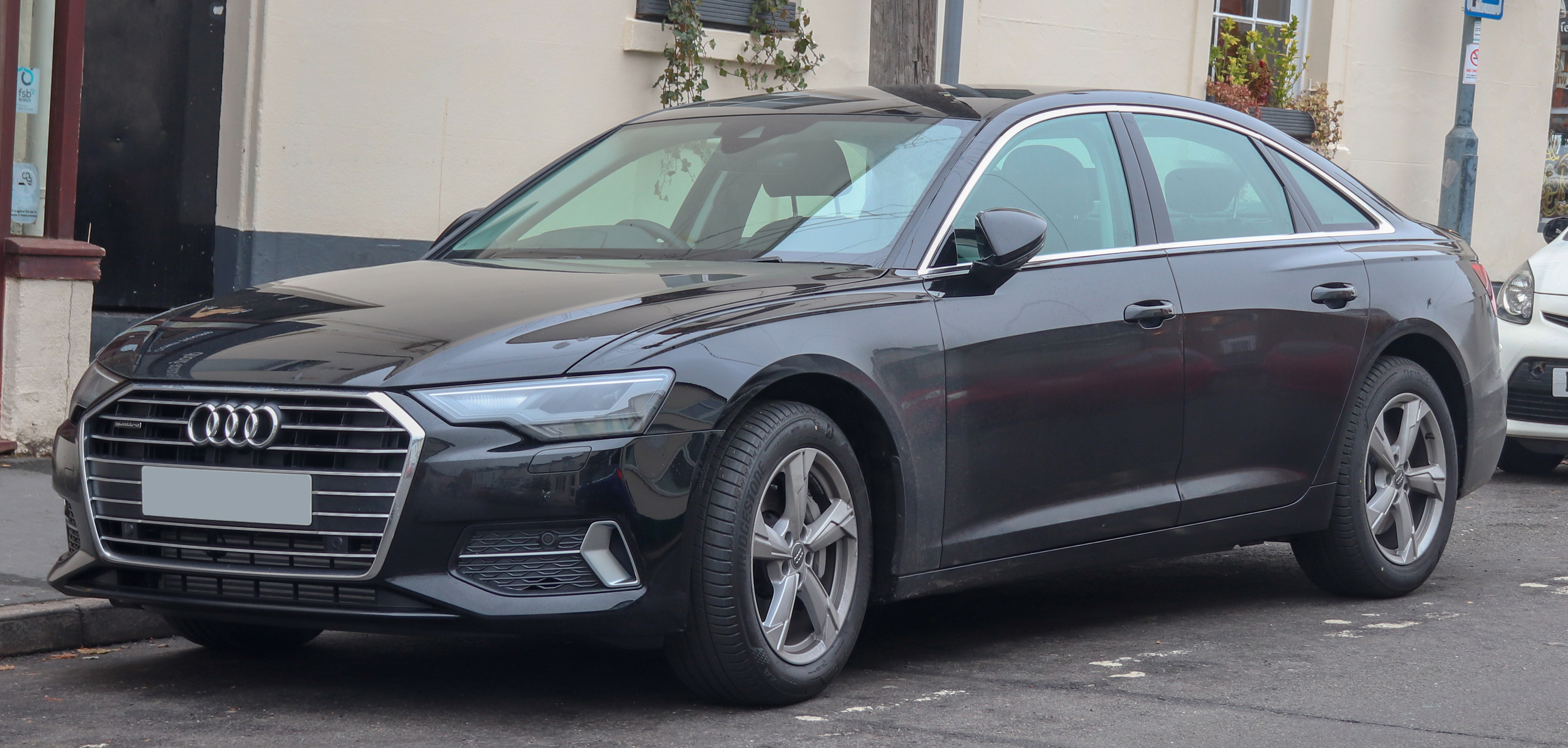
Audi A6
5th generation (2018–present)

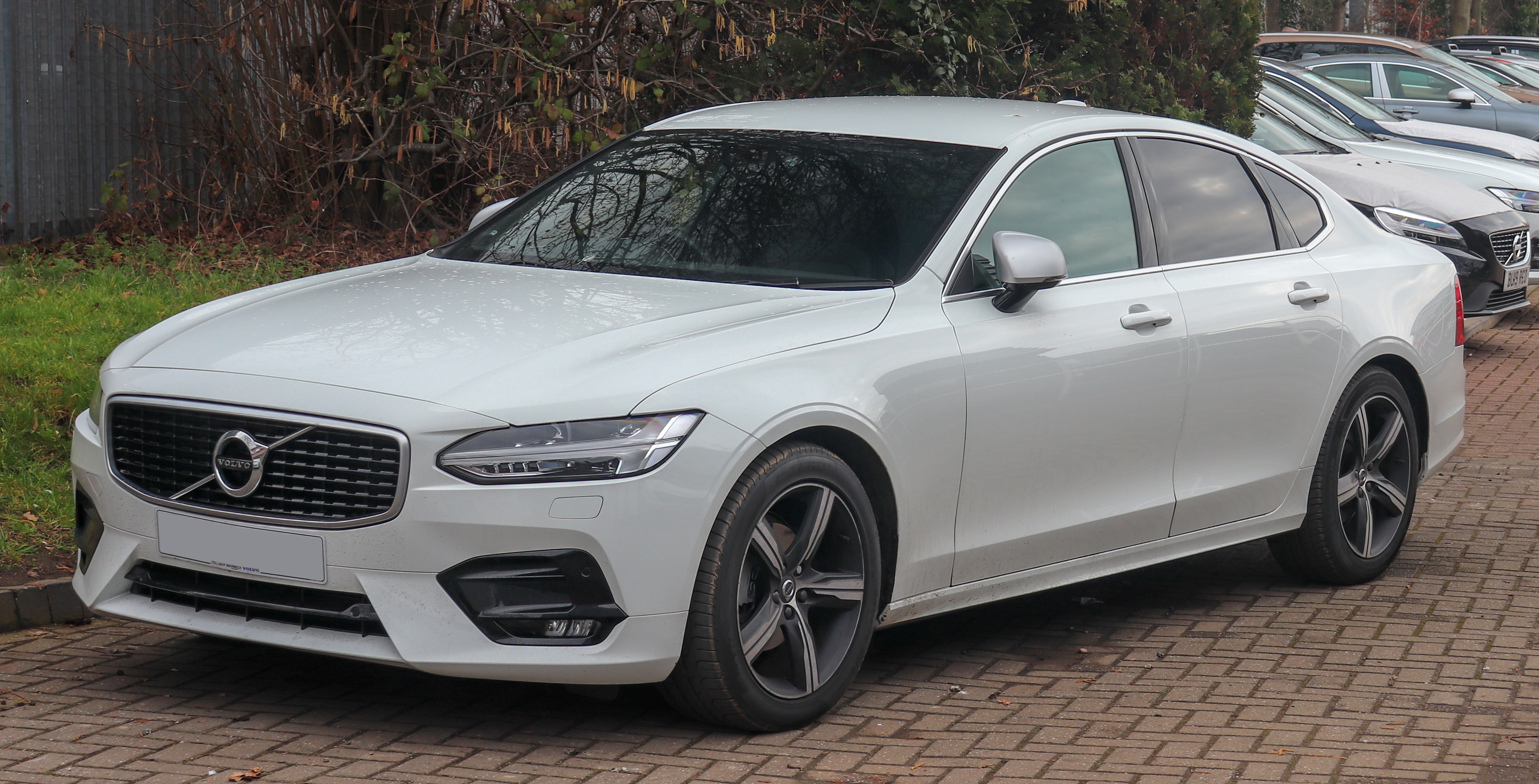
Volvo S90
1st generation (2016-present)

The E-segment is the 5th category of the European segments for passenger cars, synonymous with the term executive car.

E-Segment is a niche in Europe (2-3% penetration in 2010s). In 2017, 2018, 2019 and 2020, E-segment sales accounted for 2.7%, 2.7%, 2.3% and 2.1% market share in Europe, respectively.

== Characteristics ==
Most E-segment cars are sedans/saloons, however several models are also produced in other body styles such as wagons/estates. As of 2021, E-segment cars typically have a length of about 4.8 to 5 m (15.7 to 16.4 ft).

== European vs. American classification ==
The terms E-segment or executive car do not have a one-to-one equivalent in the American car classification. However, if a modern E-segment sedan by a European brand is sold in the U.S., it falls into the category of both mid-size and full-size sedan, usually a mid-size luxury sedan.

The American mid-size sedan classification (Note: Also, the American full-size sedan classification does not have any equivalent in the European classification with the exception of full-size luxury cars which belong to the F-segment. As European segments denote both size and equipment level, American full-size cars that are not luxury cars simply do not belong to any of the European segments. Considering length only, they would always fall into the F-segment or even exceed its dimensions - with a possible exception of the Toyota Avalon and Nissan Maxima which may or may not be short enough to be considered E-segment (this is as of 2021).) spans both the D-segment and the E-segment. With size brackets of European car segments increasing, the Toyota Camry fell from the E-segment into the D-segment while remaining a mid-size car.

== Current models ==
In 2020, the highest selling E-segment cars in Europe were the Mercedes-Benz E-class, BMW 5 Series, Audi A6, Volvo V90/S90 and Porsche Taycan.

50,000 - 100,000 sales (Best-Selling)

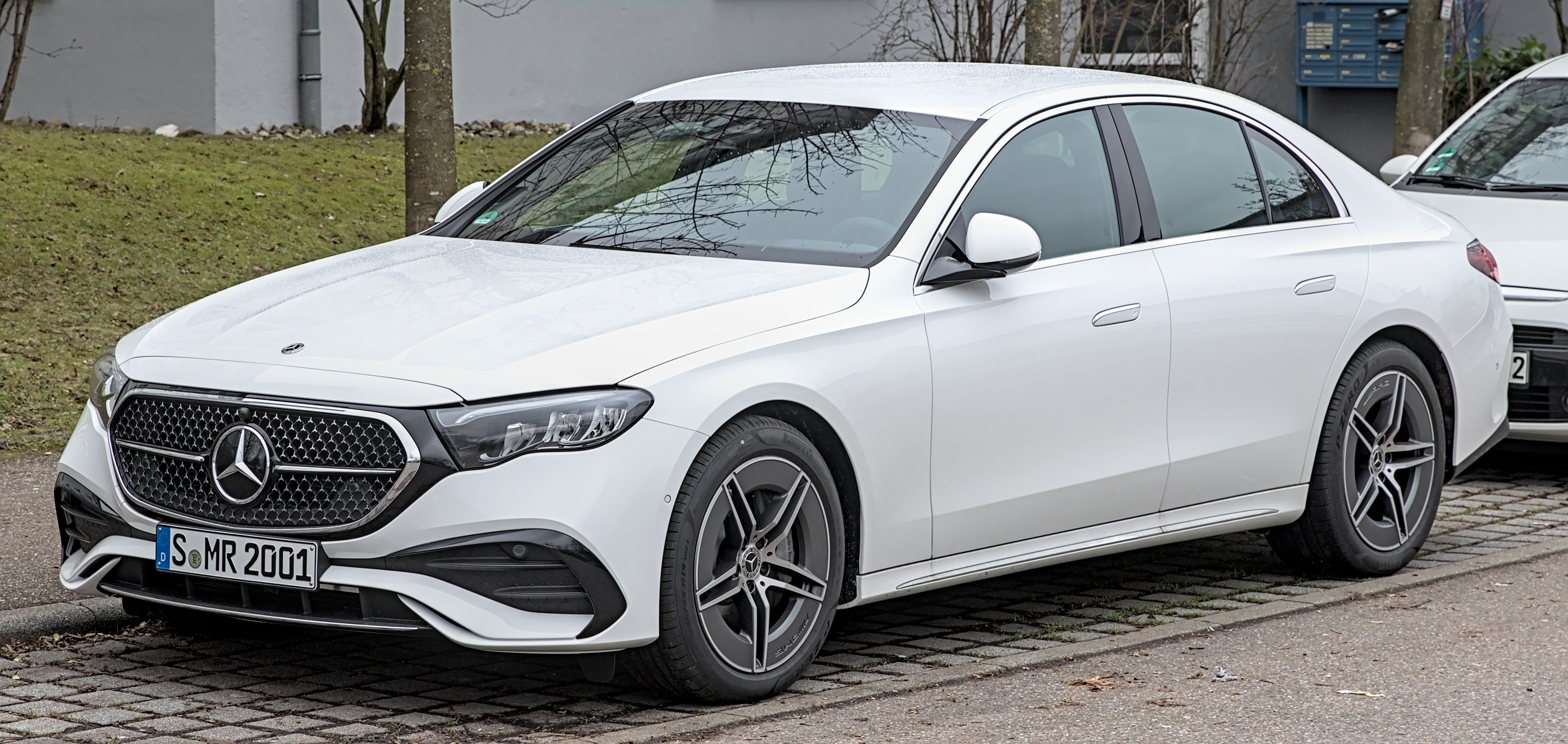
Mercedes-Benz E-Class
6th generation (2024–present)

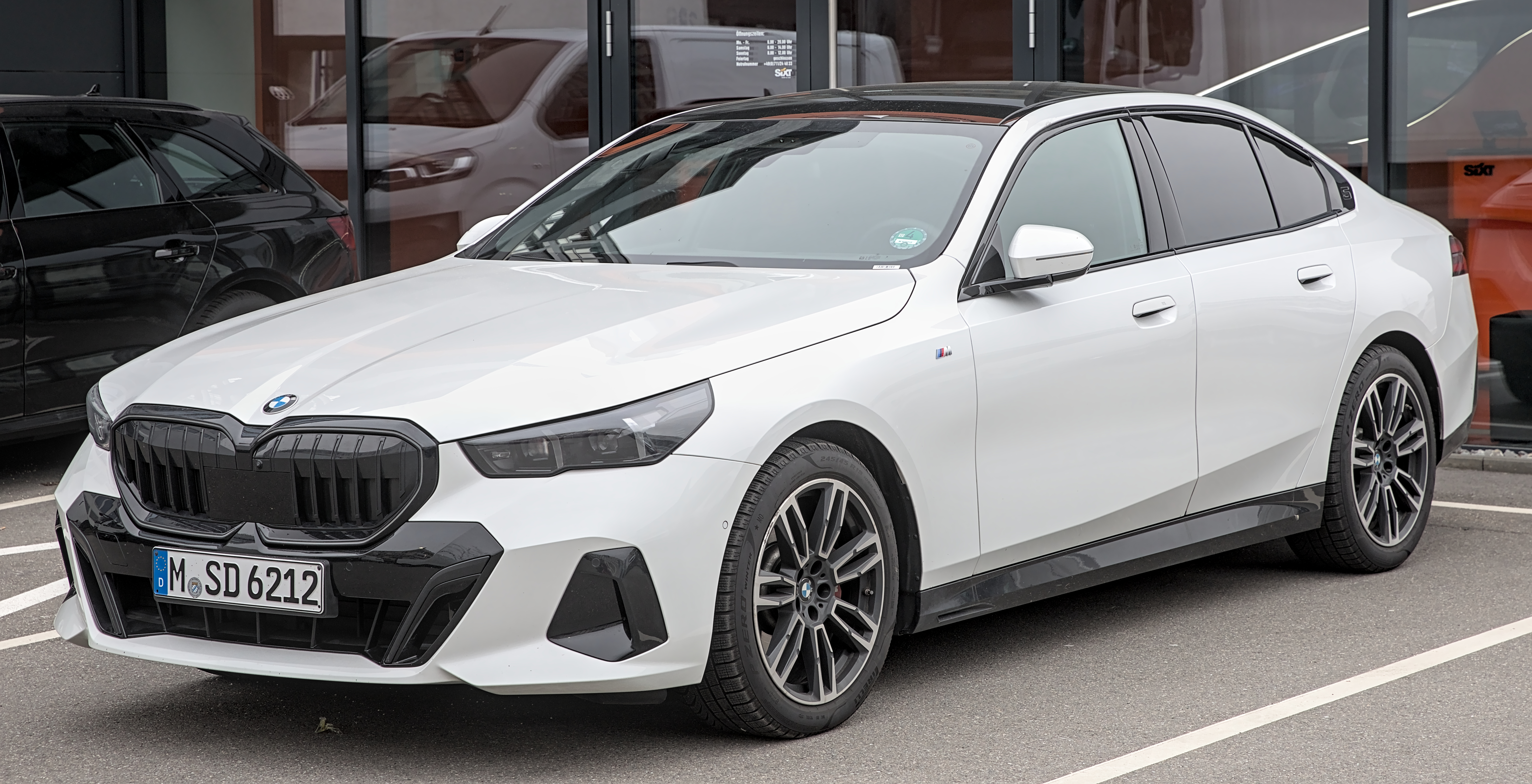
BMW 5 Series
8th generation (2024–present)

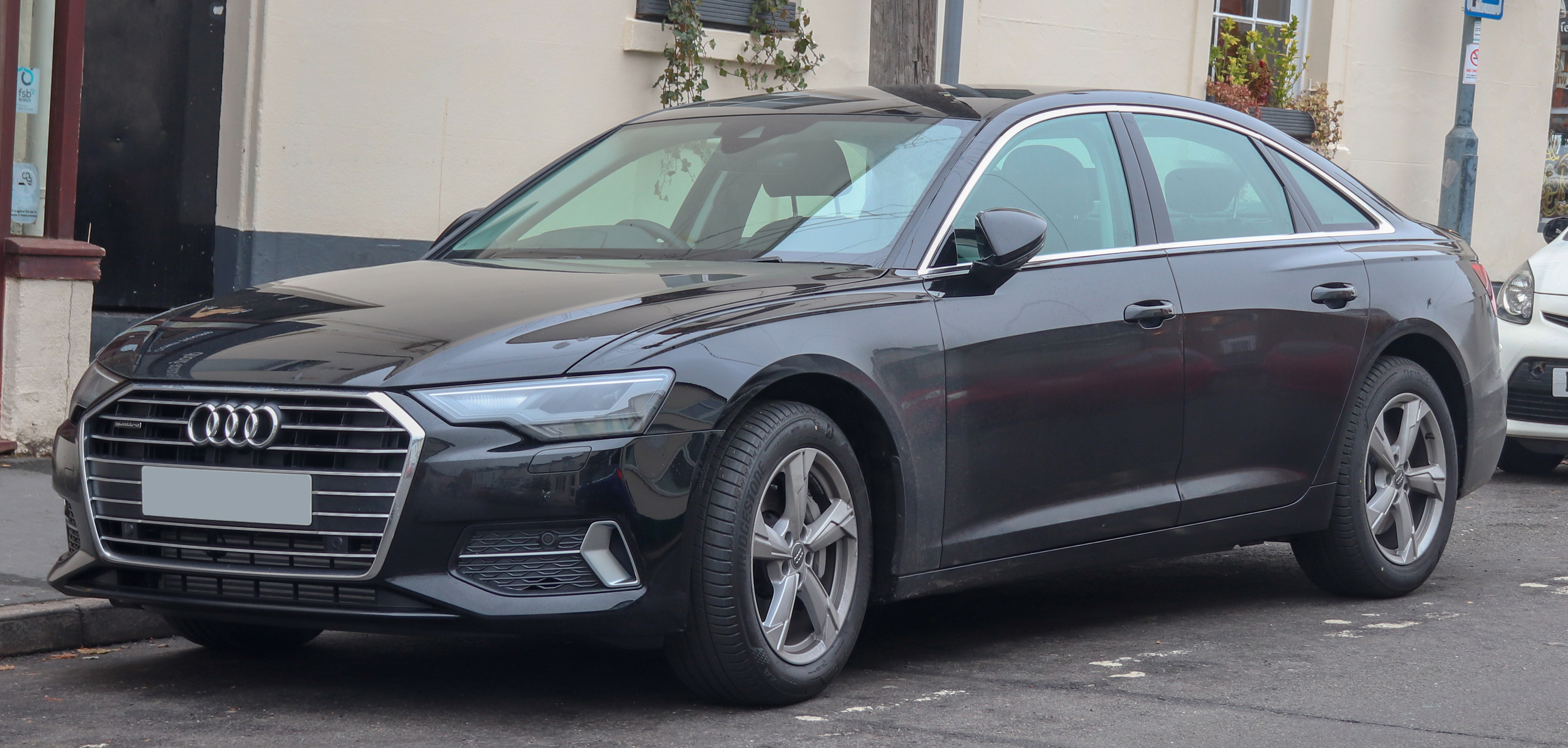
Audi A6
5th generation (2018–present)

10,000 - 50,000 sales

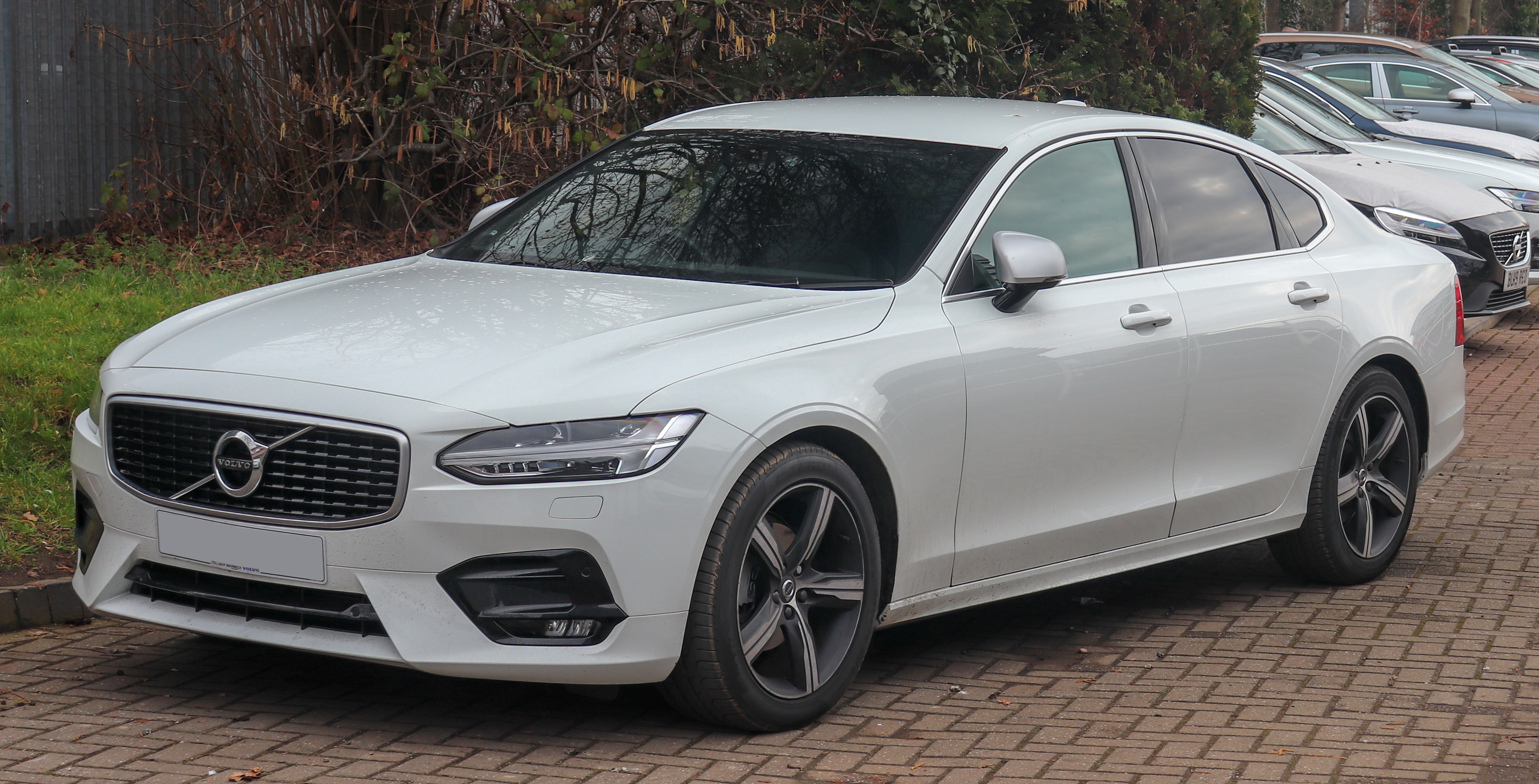
Volvo S90
1st generation (2016-present)

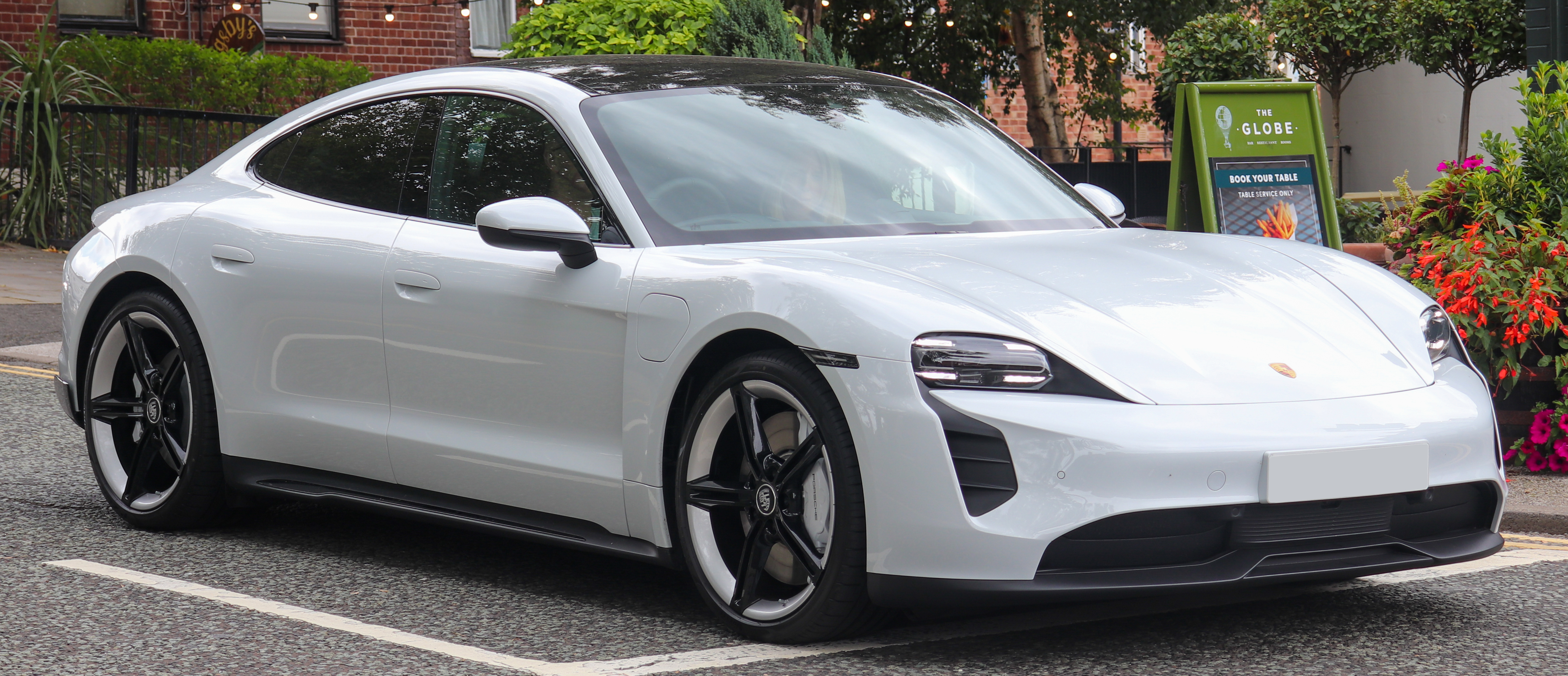
Porsche Taycan
1st generation (2019-present)

Fewer than 10,000 sales

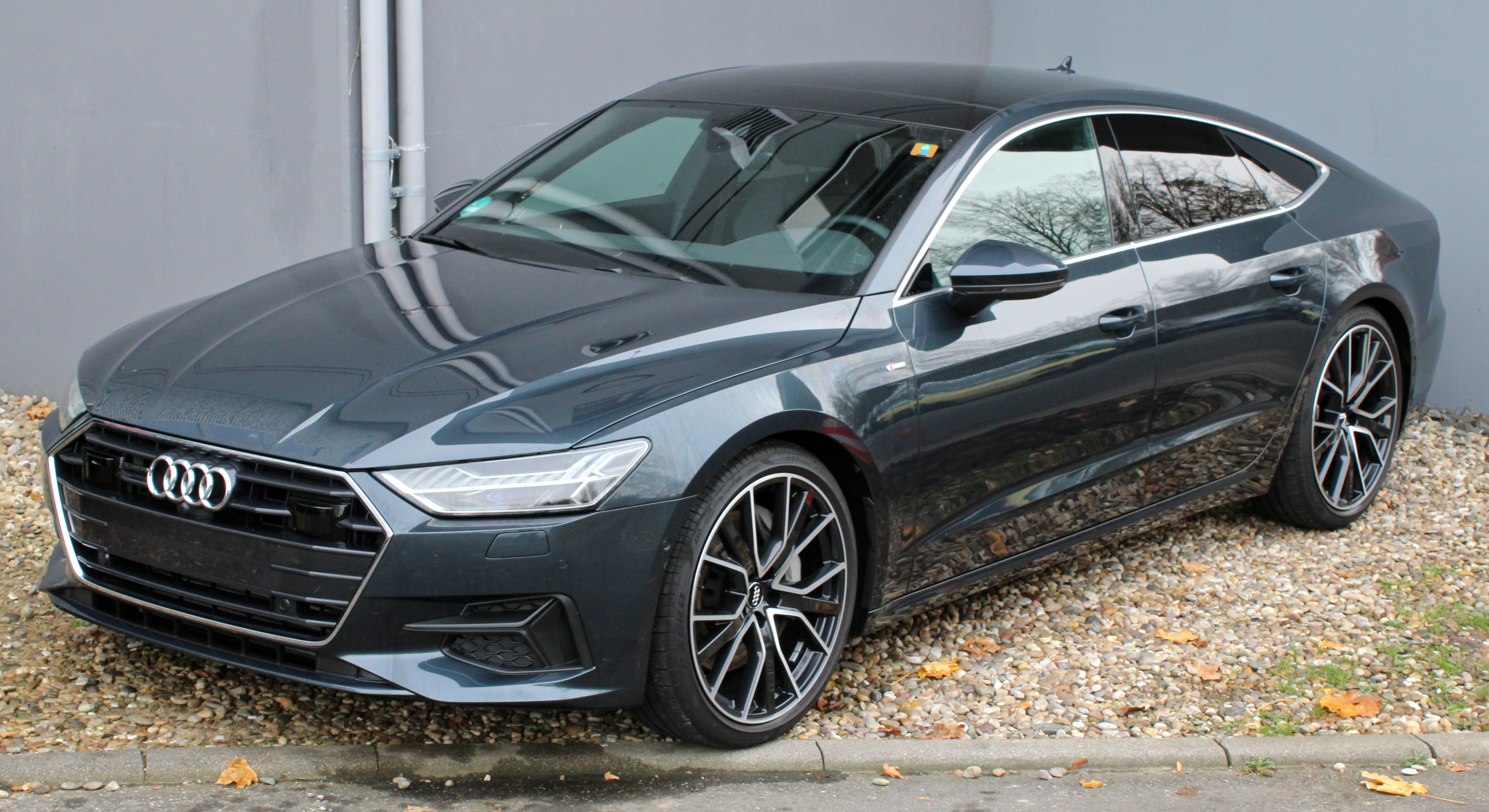
Audi A7
2nd generation (2018-present)

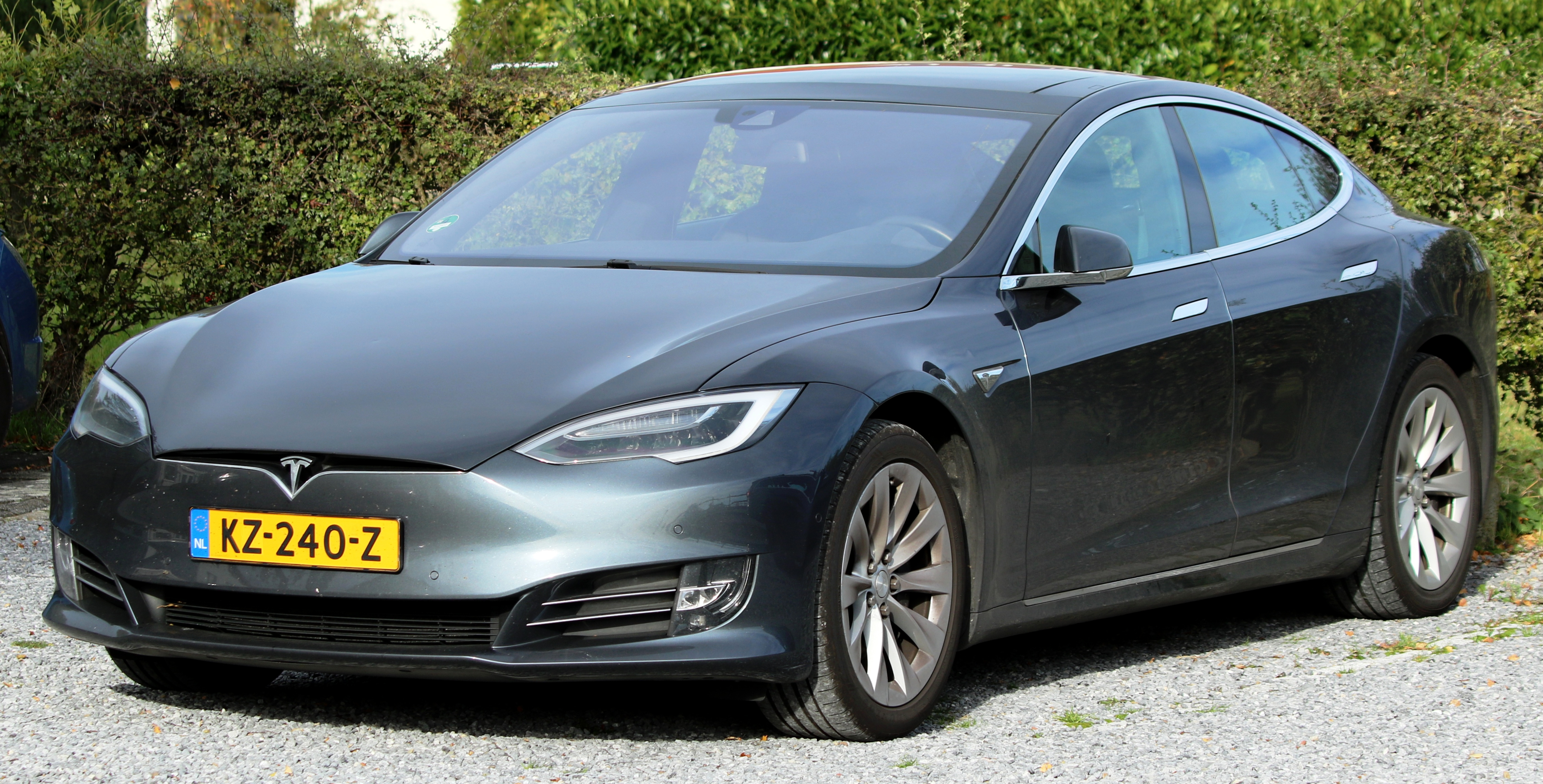
Tesla Model S
1st generation (2012-2026)

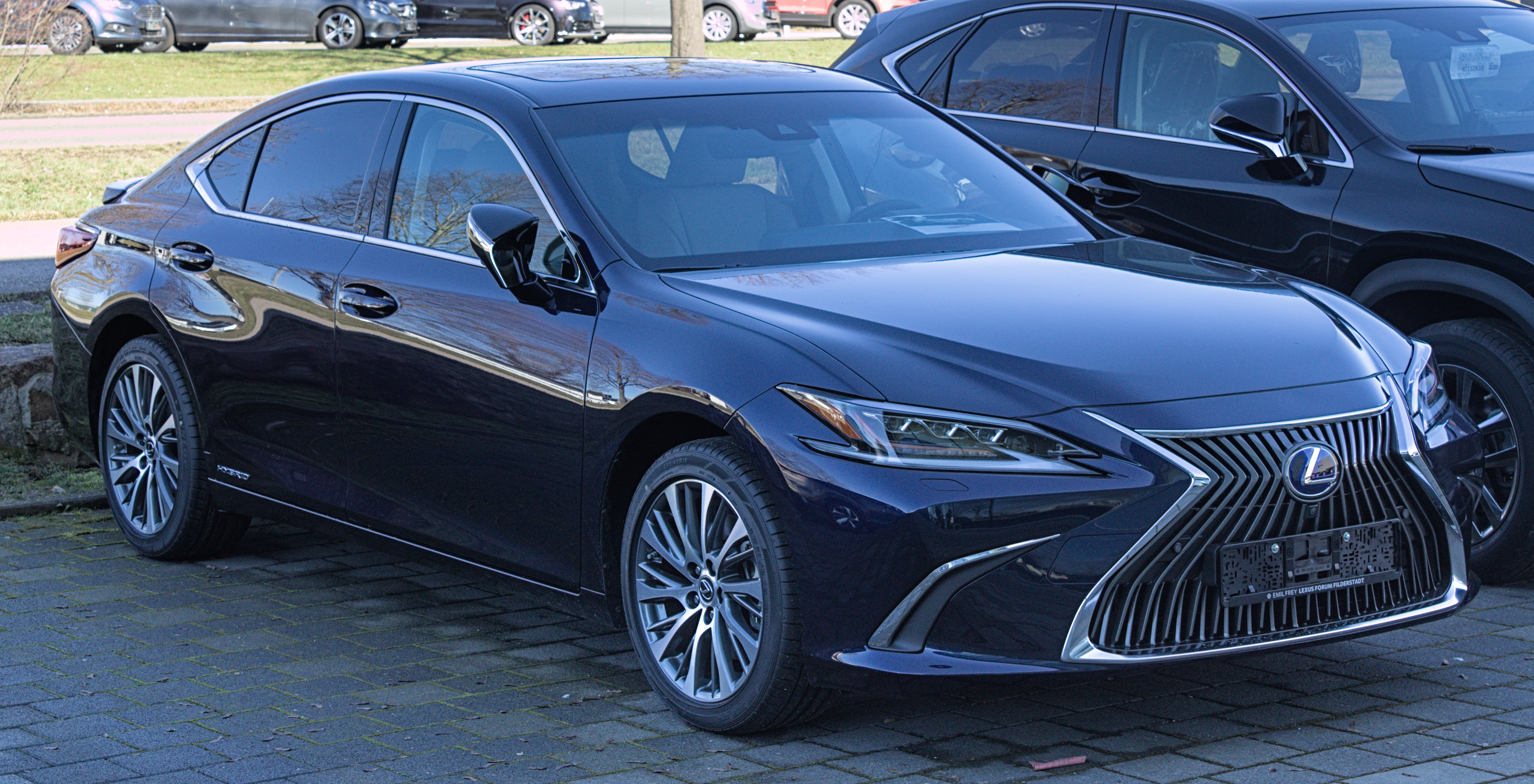
Lexus ES
7th generation (2018-present)

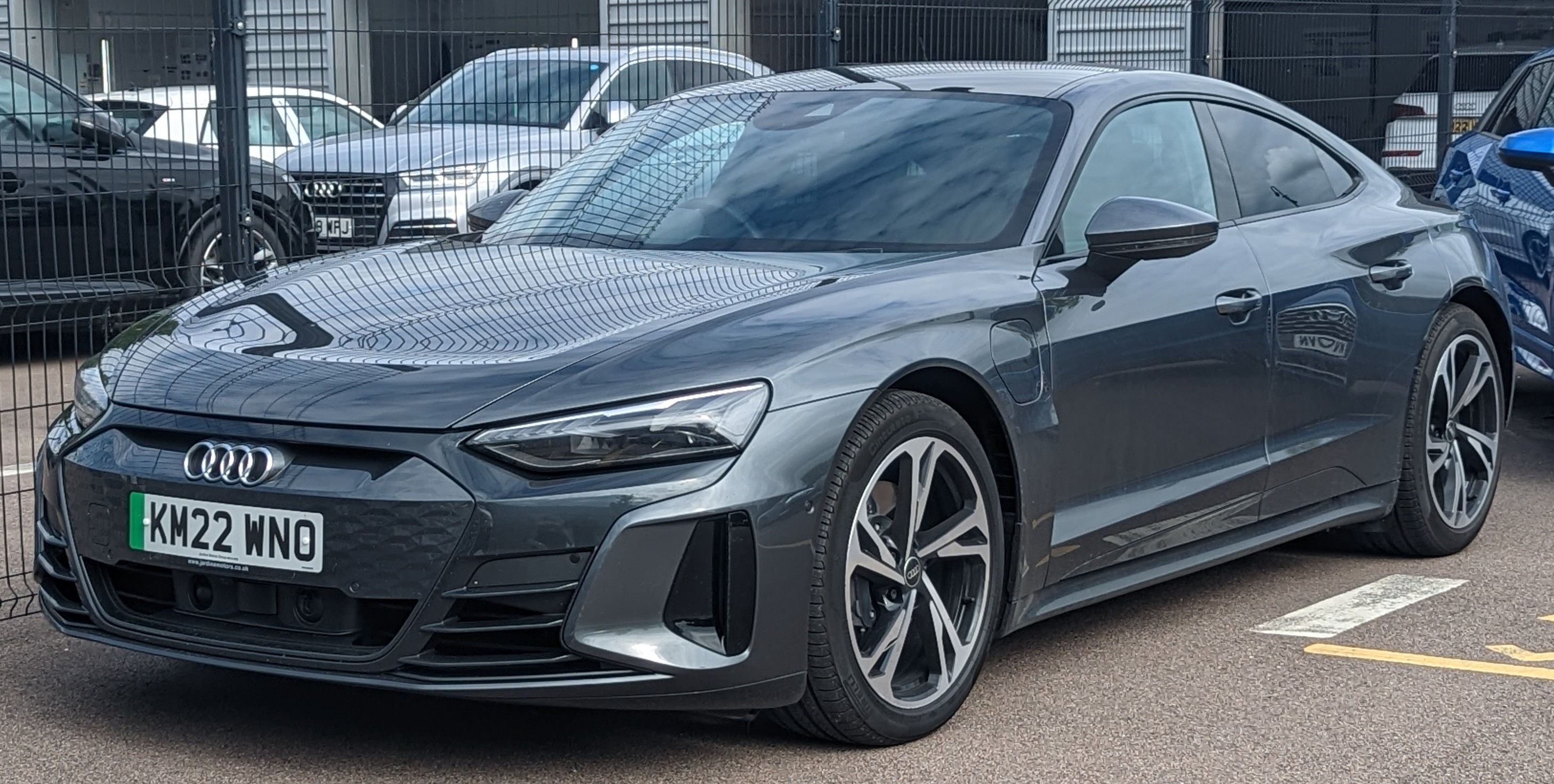
Audi e-tron GT
1st generation (2020–present)

Moved to F-segment

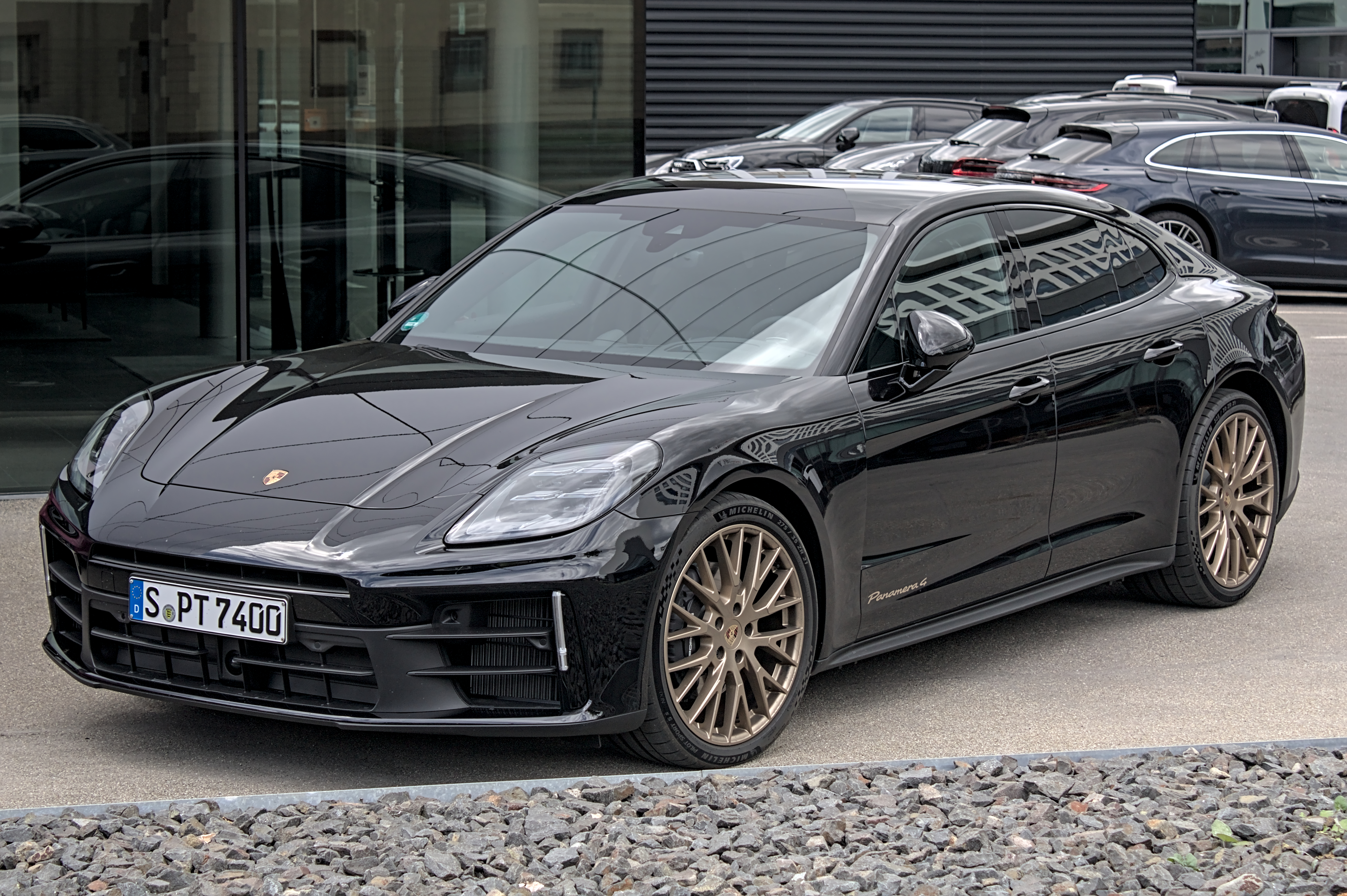
Porsche Panamera
3rd generation (2024-present)

== Sales figures in Europe ==
2020 rank	Brand	Model	2013	2014	2015	2016	2017	2018	2019	2020	% change (2019–2020)
1	Mercedes-Benz	E-Class	106,559	99,565	84,771	99,494	127,638	117,906	107,453	70,171	▼ -35%
2	BMW	5 Series	107,307	98,701	88,898	81,599	109,953	108,653	89,326	59,814	▼ -33%
3	Audi	A6 / S6 / RS6 / A6 allroad quattro	82,883	84,283	95,329	93,479	78,944	71,258	83,012	55,737	▼ -33%
4	Volvo	S90 / V90	-	-	-	10,834	55,193	56,192	40,315	23,578	▼ -42%
5	Porsche	Taycan	-	-	-	-	-	-	746	12,332	▲ +1553%
6	Audi	Audi A7 / S7 / RS7	8,986	8,473	10,196	9,120	6,111	8,935	8,185	5,807	▼ -29%
7	Tesla	Model S	3,911	8,841	15,169	11,564	16,026	17,386	8,635	5,562	▼ -36%
8	Mercedes-Benz	CLS-Class	15,139	10,289	12,600	7,803	5,116	9,113	8,428	3,895	▼ -54%
9	Lexus	ES	-	-	-	-	-	217	3,818	3,699	▼ -3%
10	Jaguar	XF	20,414	20,609	16,416	16,024	12,501	10,375	5,935	2,450	▼ -59%
11	BMW	6 Series	8,549	7,880	7,370	5,732	5,610	10,703	5,362	2,060	▼ -62%
12	Maserati	Ghibli	339	4,238	4,644	4,124	2,981	2,534	1,723	1,006	▼ -42%
13	Polestar	Polestar 1	-	-	-	-	-	-	0	65	New
14	Infiniti	Q70	339	145	560	484	362	64	21	4	▼ -81%
15	Lexus	GS	1,922	2,032	1,373	2,023	1,508	1,066	163	1	▼ -99%
16	Genesis	G80	-	163	228	131	49	30	9	0	▼ -100%
	BMW	8 Series	-	-	-	-	-	1,299	(moved to F-Segment)		
	Volvo	V70 / XC70	40,260	46,348	49,263	30,436	511	21	(replaced by V90 Series)		
	Chrysler/Lancia	300C/Thema	2,236	392	28	19	16	12			
Segment total			402,673	394,931	389,184	366,603	422,525	415,757	363,131	246,181	▼ -32%
Source											

Notes:

1. The table includes not only E-segment cars, but also a car fitting the F-segment in terms of size (the 2011 Chrysler 300).

2. Our source of information initial include BMW 8 Series in E-segment, but latter moved to F-segment.

== Market share in Europe ==
2019 - Sales of large cars in Europe were down 13% in 2019 to 362,300 units, a new record low annual volume for this class, which now accounts for 2.3% of the total European car market, down from 2.7% in 2018.

2020 - The large cars segment in Europe is down 32% in 2020, to just over 246,000 deliveries. This means the segment loses ground on the overall market again and now accounts for just 2.1% of the total European car market, down from 2.3% in 2019. With the exception of a newcomer, the entire top-8, which accounts for nearly 91% of the segment's sales, drops by 29% or more and thus falls behind the overall market. Only one single model in the class manages to keep its decline limited to single digits.

== See also ==
- D-segment
- F-segment
- Euro Car Segment
- Car classification
- Executive car
