= E (disambiguation) =

E is the fifth letter of the Latin alphabet.

E, e, or e- may also refer to:

== Computing and mathematics ==
=== Computer hardware ===
- eMachines, a brand of personal computers, founded 1998, first acquired 2004, and discontinued 2013

=== User interfaces ===
- Enlightenment (window manager), a compositing window manager for the X Window System
- /e/ (operating system), a fork of LineageOS, which in turn is based on Android
- E (1970s text editor), a text editor developed at the Stanford AI Lab in the 1970s
- E (PC DOS), a text editor

=== Programming languages and provers ===
- E (programming language), an object-oriented programming language created by Electric Communities for secure distributed computing
- Amiga E, a programming language created by Wouter van Oortmerssen
- e (verification language), a hardware verification language
- E (theorem prover), a modern, high performance prover for first-order logic

=== Logic and abstract mathematics ===
- E (complexity), a set of decision problems solvable by a Turing machine in a specific time
- ∃, the symbol for existential quantification ("there exists"), in predicate logic
  - ∃!, the symbol for uniqueness quantification ("there exists only/exactly one")
- e, the identity element (e.g. 0 for addition, 1 for multiplication)
- ∈, notation indicating that an object is a member or element of a set

=== Concrete mathematics ===
- E (digit), representing 14 in positional numeral systems of a base of 15 or higher, such as hexadecimal
- E notation, or scientific notation, a way of writing very large and very small numbers such as 5E7
- $\operatorname{E}[X]$ or expected value, the average expected outcome of a trial in probability theory
- E, the complete elliptic integral of the second kind
- E, the Erdős–Borwein constant, equal to 1.60669...
- e (mathematical constant) or ℇ, also known as Euler's number and Napier's constant, equal to 2.71828...
- e or orbital eccentricity, a measure of how much a conic section deviates from a circle

== Science and engineering ==
=== Biology and medicine ===
- E number, a number code for a food additive, an EU labelling requirement
- Haplogroup E (mtDNA), a human mitochondrial DNA (mtDNA) haplogroup
- Haplogroup E (Y-DNA), a Y-chromosomal DNA (Y-DNA) haplogroup
- Glutamic acid or glutamate, abbreviated E or Glu
- Vitamin E, a group of chemically related vitamins
- Epinephrine, a hormone
- MDMA, a psychoactive recreational drug often called Ecstasy or E
- Ethambutol
- Estrogen (medication)
- Estradiol (medication)
- E-site, the exit binding site for t-RNA

=== Electricity ===
- e, one of two fundamental subatomic particles:
  - e^{−}, electron
  - e^{+}, positron
- e or elementary charge, the absolute value of the electric charge carried by a single electron
- E region (between D and F) or the Kennelly–Heaviside layer, part of the ionosphere
- E, the symbol for an electric field
- E, the electrode potential, the electromotive force of a cell built of two electrodes
  - E° or $E^\ominus$, the standard electrode potential

=== Telecommunication ===
- E band (disambiguation)
- E or EDGE, for Enhanced Data Rates for GSM Evolution

=== Other uses in science and engineering ===
- e or coefficient of restitution (COR), a measure of the elasticity of a collision in mechanics
- E, the symbol for energy in equations concerning mass–energy equivalence
- E or Young's modulus, a measure of stiffness in solid mechanics
- E or exa-, the SI prefix for 10^{18}
- E or Equal Energy spectrum, a definition of white in colour printing
- (E), E–Z notation used in chemistry to indicate double bonds that two groups of higher priority are on opposite sides

== Commerce and transportation ==
=== Vehicles ===
- E, the letter designating an electric locomotive in Poland
- E (underground car)
- E-Mark, an approval mark for automotive products in Europe under the World Forum for Harmonization of Vehicle Regulations
- Mini E, an electric hatchback built as a demonstration car
- Honda e, an electric hatchback

=== Transit routes ===
- E (AC Transit), a bus service in the San Francisco Bay Area, California
- RapidRide E Line, a limited-stop bus route operated by King County Metro, Washington
- : E Embarcadero, a San Francisco Municipal Railway historic streetcar line
- E (Los Angeles Railway), a streetcar route in California
- : E Line (Los Angeles Metro), formerly the Expo Line, a light rail line in California
- : E (New York City Subway service), AKA Eighth Avenue Local
- : Green Line E branch, AKA the Huntington Avenue branch, formerly the Arborway Line, of the Massachusetts Bay Transportation Authority (MBTA) subway
- : E Line (RTD), a Regional Transportation District light rail line in Denver metropolitan area, Colorado
- : Line E (Buenos Aires Underground), in Argentina
- : E (S-train), in Copenhagen, Denmark
- : RER E, a line in the Réseau Express Régional, Paris, France
- : Toei Ōedo Line, a subway service operated by the Tokyo Metropolitan Bureau of Transportation
- The official West Japan Railway Company service symbol for:
  - : San'in Main Line
  - : Kisuki Line

=== Car license plates ===
- E, the international vehicle registration code for vehicle registration plates of Spain
- E, the prefix in vehicle registration plates of Indonesia for Cirebon, Majalengka, Indramayu and Kuningan

=== Other uses in commerce and transportation ===
- €, the euro sign, the symbol for the euro, the European Union's standard currency unit
- ℮, the estimated sign, an EU symbol declaring that the weight or volume of pre-packaged goods is within specific allowable tolerances
- E or Eni, an Italian oil and gas company

== Places ==
=== Political ===
- Chinese: 鄂
  - E (state), a vassal state in Zhou Dynasty China (1046–256 BC)
  - Hubei, abbreviated in Chinese as È, a province of China
- E Township, Maine, an unincorporated community in US
- E postcode area, for east London
- E, New Brunswick's postal code

=== Geographical ===
- E or east, one of the four cardinal directions
- Mount E (Japanese: 恵山, romanized: E-san, lit. 'Mount Wisdom'), a stratovolcano on Oshima Peninsula, Japan
- River E, a river in Scotland

== Language and linguistics ==
- É (temple), Sumerian word for house or temple
- E language, a Tai–Chinese mixed language spoken primarily in Rongshui Miao Autonomous County, Guangxi, China
- E, the Spivak pronoun meaning "he" or "she"
- e, the close-mid front unrounded vowel IPA symbol
- E- (prefix), an Internet-related prefixed used in words such as e-mail
- É (cuneiform), a common-use sign
- E (Indic), a vowel of Indic abugidas, pronounced /eː/; when an independent vowel, it is written in various scripts as:,, ए, এ, ஏ, ఏ, ଏ, ಏ, ഏ, એ, ਏ, 𑀏, 𑖊, 𑌏, ꡠ, 𑐊, 𑰊, 𑆍, ဧ, ᦵ, ឯ, เ, ꪵ, එ, 𑄆, ᥫ, 𑤆, ꢌ, ꨃ, 𑘊, 𑦪, 𑒋, ꫠ, 𑚆, 𑠆, 𑈄, 𑊶, 𑅓, 𑊃, ᬏ, ꦌ, ᮈ, 𑴆, ᐁ
- E (Mongolic), ᠧ, also used in Tungusic languages
- E (hangul), ㅔ, used in Korean
- E (kana), え/エ, used in Japanese
- E (Cyrillic), Э/э

=== Similar-looking letters ===
- Ɛ/ɛ, the letter epsilon in the Latin alphabet
- Ε/ε/ϵ, the letter epsilon in the Greek alphabet
- ⴹ, the letter yaḍ in the Tifinagh alphabet
- Е/е, the letter ye in the Cyrillic alphabet
- ㅌ, the hangul tieut in the Korean alphabet
- ꗋ, the syllable tɔ in the Vai syllabary
- Ꭼ/ꭼ, the syllable gv/kə̃ in the Cherokee syllabary
- ᰀ, the consonant ka in the Lepcha script
- ꯐ, the letter pham in the Meitei script
- 𐐁/𐐩, the letter long E in the Deseret alphabet
- 𖼬, the consonant nya in the Pollard script
- ᗴ, the syllable cha in a Chipewyan script in the Canadian Aboriginal syllabics family
- Є/є, the letter ye in Ukrainian Cyrillic and other scripts
- Ⲉ, the letter e in Coptic script
- عـ/ـعـ/ـع/ع, the letter 'ayn in the Arabic alphabet
- ٤, the digit four in the Eastern Arabic numerals
- 𐎅, the letter h in the Ugaritic alphabet
- Ҽ, the letter che in the Cyrillic script alphabet of the Abkhaz language
- ⱸ, a letter in the Swedish Dialect Alphabet
- Ə/ə, the letter schwa in the International Phonetic Alphabet and Latin alphabet
- Ә/ә, the letter schwa I the Cyrillic alphabet
- Ǝ/ǝ, the letter turned E in the Pan-Nigerian alphabet

== Arts and media ==
=== Music ===
==== Music theory ====
- E (musical note)
  - E major, a scale
  - E minor, a scale
  - E, the chord notation for the E major triad

==== Albums ====
- e (Adrian Belew album), 2009
- É (album), by Duda Brack, 2015
- E (Ecco2k album), 2019
- E (Enslaved album), 2017
- E (Epik High album), 2009
- E (single album), by Big Bang, 2015

==== Other uses in music ====
- Mark Oliver Everett, musician and front man of the rock band Eels, nicknamed "E"
- E (band), active 1984–1997, a Czech experimental rock group from Brno
- E (video), by Eminem, 2000
- "E" (Saves the Day song), from 2011 album Daybreak
- "E (Ventex)", a 2020 single by Albatraoz featuring Ture Brute, included on Albumtraoz

=== Television ===
- E, short for "episode"; commonly combined with "S" for season
- E!, Entertainment Television, an American cable and satellite TV network
  - E! (Australia and New Zealand), the defunct Australian and New Zealand version of American E!
- E! (Canada):
  - E! (Canadian TV system), a defunct over-the-air television system operated by Canwest from 2001 to 2009 (originally known as CH until 2007)
  - E! (Canadian TV channel), a Canadian cable/satellite specialty channel owned by Bell Media that launched in November 2010
- E, an alias of Eric Murphy (Entourage), a character from the television series Entourage
- The Keys of Marinus, a 1964 Doctor Who serial (production code "E")

=== Film ===
- E (Exempt), an unofficial category in the British Board of Film Classification rating system
- E, an alias of Edna Mode, a character from the movie The Incredibles
- E (2006 film), transl. The Fly, an Indian Tamil-language medical thriller
- E (2017 film), an Indian Malayalam-language supernatural horror film
- E (2025 film), a Finnish experimental drama

=== Literature ===
- e (novel), a 2000 comic novel by Matt Beaumont
- E, or the Elohist, one of the four sources of the Torah

=== Gaming ===
- E, or Everyone, a video game rating symbol used by the Entertainment Software Rating Board which is suitable for all ages
- Eric Neustadter, former Operations Manager for Xbox Live and frequent co-host of the "Major Nelson Radio" podcast, nicknamed "e"

== Sports ==
- E#, a team's elimination number
- Eredivisie logo (symbol "E")

== Other uses ==
- Dominical letter E for a common year starting on Wednesday
- E (surname) (Chinese: 鄂), Chinese surname
- Mrs. E, the pseudonym of the legal guardian and respondent in E (Mrs) v Eve, a 1986 Supreme Court of Canada judgement on performing proxy-consented, non-therapeutic medical procedures on people of diminished mental capacity
- E (cup size), a bra measurement descriptor
- E (grade), a failing or barely passing mark in many grading systems
- E (meme), based on images of Markiplier, Lord Farquaad, and Mark Zuckerberg

== See also ==
- Big E (disambiguation)
- Block E (disambiguation)
- Class E (disambiguation)
- E class (disambiguation)
- E number (disambiguation)
- E-Series (disambiguation)
- E-Type (disambiguation)
- E! (disambiguation)
- E+
- Formula E (disambiguation)
- Group E (disambiguation)
- Model E (disambiguation)
- Mr. E (disambiguation)
- Open E (disambiguation)
- E1 (disambiguation)
- 1E (disambiguation)
- EE (disambiguation)
