= E class =

E class may refer to:

== Automobiles ==
- Mercedes-Benz E-Class, a series of automobiles built by Mercedes-Benz
- Chrysler E-Class, a mid-sized car produced between 1983 and 1984
- E-segment, a European vehicle size class

== Ships ==
- British E-class submarine, submarines of the Royal Navy that served in World War I
- United States E-class submarine, submarines of the United States Navy
- E-class cruiser, British Royal Navy cruisers in service during World War II
- E-class destroyer, British Royal Navy destroyers in service during World War II
- E-class lifeboat, British lifeboats
- E-class container ship, built between 2006 and 2008

== Rail vehicles ==
=== Australia ===
- MRWA E class, diesel shunting locomotive
- South Australian Railways E class, 2-4-0 steam locomotives
- Tasmanian Government Railways E class, 4-6-0T steam locomotives
- Victorian Railways E class, steam locomotives
- Victorian Railways E class (electric)
- WAGR E class, 4-6-2 steam locomotives
- WAGR E class (1879), 2-4-4-2T double-Fairlie locomotives
- E-class Melbourne tram
- E-class Melbourne tram (1914)
- E-class Sydney tram

=== Ireland ===
- CIÉ 401 Class, diesel shunting locomotive
- CIÉ 421 Class, diesel shunting locomotive

=== New Zealand ===
- NZR E class (1872), Double Fairlie locomotive
- NZR E class (1906), Mallet locomotive
- New Zealand E class locomotive (1922), battery-electric locomotive

=== United Kingdom ===
- Metropolitan Railway E Class, steam locomotives
- SECR E class, steam locomotives

== Other uses ==
- E-class blimp, United States Navy blimp

== See also ==
- Class E (disambiguation)
- E type (disambiguation)
- Model E (disambiguation)
- E (disambiguation)
