= 鄂 =

鄂 (pinyin: è) may refer to the following:

- The abbreviation for Hubei Province, People's Republic of China
- E (name)
- E (state), an ancient Chinese state whose area partly coincides with present-day Hubei
- Ezhou, prefecture-level city in Hubei
  - Echeng, a district of Ezhou
