= Big E =

Big E may refer to:

- Capital letter "E"

== People ==
- Big E (wrestler) (born 1986), American professional wrestler, born Ettore Ewen, formerly known as "Big E Langston"
- Elvin Hayes (born 1945; nicknamed "Big E"), American basketball player and radio analyst
- Eric Lindros (born 1973; nicknamed "Big E"), Canadian ice hockey player

== Places ==
- Eyjafjallajökull, Iceland; the ice cap covering the stratovolcano known as "Big E"
- The Big E, West Springfield, Massachusetts, USA; a fairgounds that holds the annual The Big E agricultural fair (The Eastern States Exposition)
  - The Big E Coliseum, West Springfield, Massachusetts, USA; a 5,900-seat multi-purpose arena on the grounds of The Big E
- Eldora Speedway, nicknamed "The Big E", a dirt motorsports track near New Weston, Ohio, USA

== Ships ==
- USS Enterprise (CV-6) (nicknamed "Big E"), the sixth aircraft carrier of the United States Navy
- USS Enterprise (CVN-65) (nicknamed "Big E"), the world's first nuclear-powered aircraft carrier

== Other uses ==
- First letter at the top of an English-language eye chart
- Eastern States Exposition (The Big E), the only cross-state agricultural fair in the United States, held annually in West Springfield, Massachusetts
- Big E (supermarket). supermarket chain in Indianapolis, Indiana

== See also ==
- Biggie (disambiguation)
- Biggy (disambiguation)
- Big (disambiguation)
- E (disambiguation)
