= Closed e =

Closed e may refer to:

- in French and Italian, the letter e pronounced as the close-mid front unrounded vowel
- the lowercase barred o (ɵ)

== See also ==
- Open E (disambiguation)
