= Timothy Bigelow =

Timothy Bigelow or Tim Bigelow may refer to:

- Timothy Bigelow (soldier) (1739–1790), soldier in the American Revolutionary War
- Timothy Bigelow (lawyer) (1767–1821), his son, American lawyer
- Tim Bigelow (born 1978 or 1979), American rapper
