= Mr. E =

Mr. E is a name that has been used by several people and fictional characters over the years. In most cases, it is a pun based on the name being homophonous with the word mystery.

Mr. E may refer to:

- Mister E, a DC Comics character and member of The Trenchcoat Brigade
- Mister E (Timely Comics), a Timely Comics (now Marvel Comics) character
- Mr. E (Ninjago), a character in Ninjago
- Mr. E, a character in the TV series Scooby-Doo! Mystery Incorporated
- Mark Oliver Everett (b. 1963), American lead vocalist and guitarist for Eels
- Nathan Ellery, a DC comics character who masterminded the murder of Alec Holland
- The ring name of professional wrestler Abe Zvonkin while masked
- "Mr. E,” a song by Red Velvet from the 2018 EP Summer Magic
- “Mr. E,” Meal, Ready-to-Eat one of the myriad plays on the acronym MRE within the military.
- Mr. E, a character in the 2026 Nintendo Switch 2 game Yoshi and the Mysterious Book

== See also ==
- E (disambiguation)
- E (name)
- "Mr. E's Beautiful Blues", a 2000 song by Eels
