= New England town =

Unit of government in New England, US

Town
- Also known as: New England town
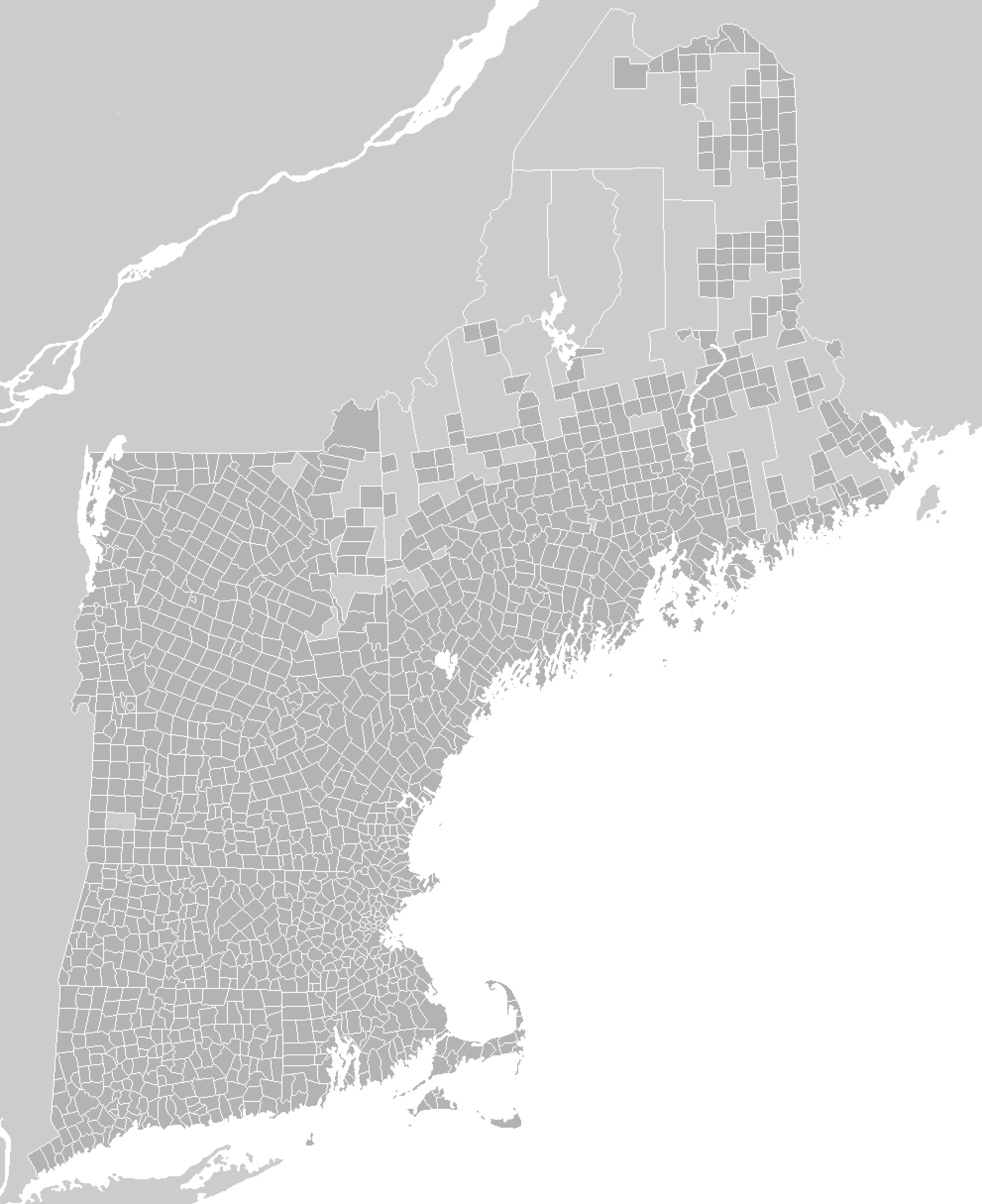
- This map shows the six New England states and their municipal subdivisions.
- Category: Municipality
- Location: New England
- Found in: County
- Created by: Various colonial agreements followed by state constitutions
- Created: 1620 (Plymouth)
- Number: 1,360
- Populations: 29 (Frenchboro) – 64,083 (West Hartford)
- Areas: 0.8 sq mi. (New Castle) – 281.3 sq mi. (Pittsburg)
- Government: Town meeting; Select Board
- Subdivisions: Village; Neighborhood

The town is the basic unit of local government and local division of state authority in the six New England states. Most other U.S. states lack a direct counterpart to the New England town. New England towns overlie the entire area of a state, similar to civil townships in other states where they exist, but they are fully functioning municipal corporations, possessing powers similar to cities and counties in other states. In the United States, New Jersey's system of equally powerful townships, boroughs, towns, and cities is the system which is most similar to that of New England; internationally, local government systems comparable to the New England town exist in much of Western Europe, such as the Gemeinden of Germany, the communes of France, the comuni of Italy, the gemeenten of the Netherlands, the municipios of Spain and the freguesias of Portugal.

New England towns are often governed by a town meeting, an assembly of eligible town residents. The great majority of municipal corporations in New England are based on the town model; there, statutory forms based on the concept of a compact populated place are uncommon, though elsewhere in the U.S. they are prevalent. County government in New England states is typically weak, and in some states nonexistent. Connecticut, for example, has no county governments, nor does Rhode Island.

Both Connecticut and Rhode Island retain counties only as geographic subdivisions with no governmental authority, while Massachusetts has abolished eight of fourteen county governments so far. Counties serve mostly as dividing lines for the states' judicial systems and some other state services in the southern New England states while providing varying (but generally limited) services in the more sparsely populated three northern New England states.

== Characteristics ==
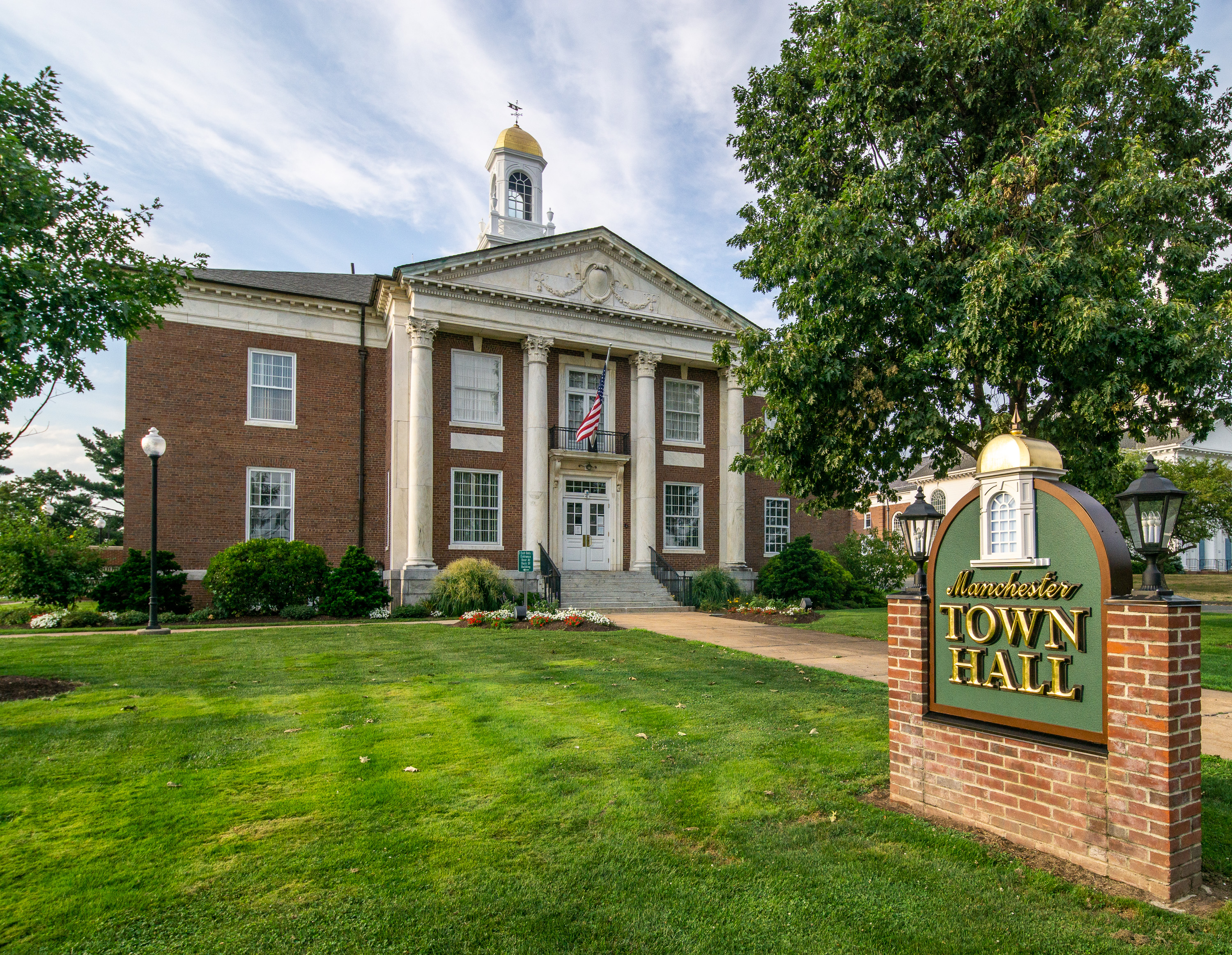
The town hall of Manchester, Connecticut

- Towns are laid out so that nearly all land within the boundaries of each state is allocated to a town or other corporate municipality. All land is incorporated into the bounds of a municipal corporation's territory, except in some very sparsely populated areas of the three northern New England states (primarily in the north).
- Towns are municipal corporations, with their powers defined by a combination of municipal corporate charter, state statutes, and the state constitution. In practice, most New England towns have significant autonomy in managing their own affairs. In most of New England, the laws regarding their authority have historically been very broadly construed, and towns in these states have nearly all of the powers that cities and towns with home rule typically have in most other U.S. states. New Hampshire and Vermont follow Dillon's Rule, which holds that local governments are largely creatures of the state.
- Traditionally, a town's legislative body is the open town meeting, which is a form of direct democratic rule, with a board of selectmen possessing executive authority. Only several Swiss cantons with Landsgemeinde remain as democratic as the small New England town meetings.
- A town almost always contains a built-up populated place (the "town center") with the same name as the town. Additional built-up places with different names are often found within towns, along with a mixture of additional urban and rural territory. Many (though not all) of these population centers have been designated by the U.S. Census Bureau as census designated places (CDP), which can be used by the Census Bureau for a separately named population center, or for an arbitrarily defined concentration of population within a town.
- There is no territory that is not part of a town between each town; leaving one town means entering another town or other municipality. In most parts of New England, towns are irregular in shape and size and are not laid out on a grid. The town center often contains a town common or town green, often used today as a small park.
- Virtually all residents of New England live within the boundaries of a municipal corporation. Residents receive most local services at the municipal level, and county government tends to provide no services in the southern three states, and limited services in the northern three states. Differences among states do exist in the level of services provided at the municipal and county level, but generally most functions normally handled by county-level government in the rest of the United States are handled by town-level government in New England. In Connecticut, Rhode Island, and most of Massachusetts, county government has been completely abolished, and counties serve merely as dividing lines for the judicial system. In other areas, some counties provide judicial and other limited administrative services. In many cases, the house numbers on streets and roads in New England reset to zero upon crossing a town or city line, and the street names themselves are usually different from town to town.
- Residents usually identify with their town for purposes of civic identity, thinking of the town in its entirety as a single, coherent community. There are some cases where residents identify more strongly with villages or sections of a town than with the town itself, particularly in Rhode Island, but this is the exception, not the rule.
- More than 90% of the municipalities in the six New England states are identified as towns. Other forms of municipalities that exist are generally based on the town concept, as well—most notably cities. Most New England cities have adopted a city form of government, with a council and a mayor or manager. Municipal entities based on the concept of a compact populated place are uncommon, such as a Vermont village or Connecticut borough. In areas of New England where such forms do exist, they remain part of the parent town and do not have all of the corporate powers and authority of an independent municipality.

== Historical development ==
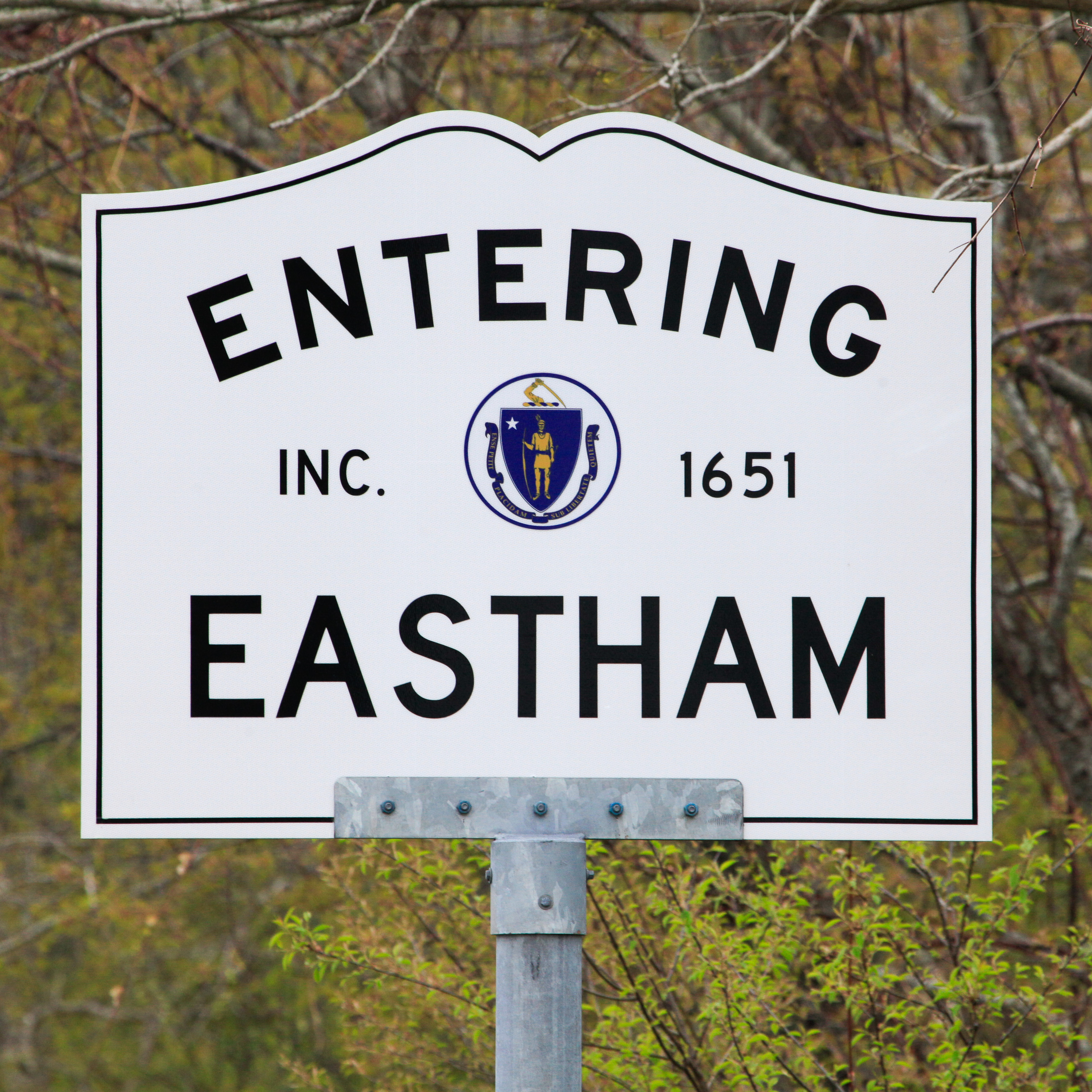
Massachusetts town line sign, indicating the name of the town, the date of its establishment, and the seal of the Commonwealth of Massachusetts

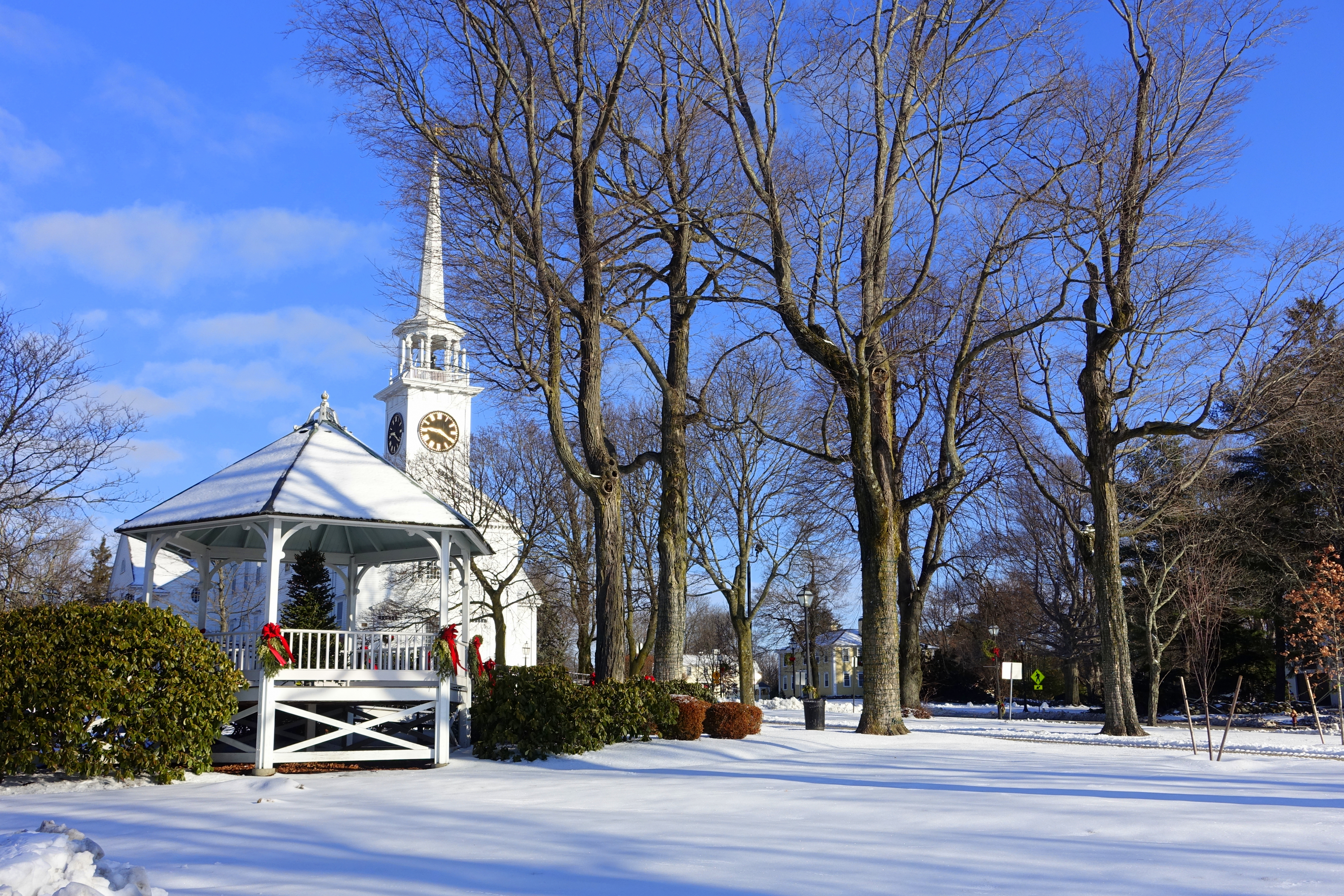
A typical New England town green in Shrewsbury, Massachusetts

Towns date back to the time of the earliest English colonial settlement, which predominated in New England, and they pre-date the development of counties in the region. Areas were organized as towns as they were settled, throughout the 17th, 18th, and 19th centuries. Town boundaries were not usually laid out on any kind of regular grid, but were drawn to reflect local settlement and transportation patterns, often affected by natural features. In early colonial times, recognition of towns was very informal, generally connected to local church divisions.

By 1700, colonial governments had become more involved in the official establishment of new towns. Towns were typically governed by a town meeting form of government, as many still are today. Towns originally were the only form of incorporated municipality in New England. The city form of government was not introduced until much later. Boston, for instance, was a town for the first two centuries of its existence.

The entire land areas of Connecticut and Rhode Island had been divided into towns by the late 18th century, and Massachusetts was almost completely covered early in the 19th century. By 1850, the only New England state that still had large unincorporated areas was Maine; by the end of the 19th century, most areas in Maine that could realistically be settled had been organized into towns.

Early town organization in Vermont and much of New Hampshire proceeded in a somewhat different manner from that of the other New England states. In these areas, towns were often "chartered" long before any settlers moved into a particular area. This was very common in the mid to late 18th century—although there were towns which predated that period and were not part of this process in southeastern New Hampshire, such as Exeter. Once there were enough residents in a town to formally organize a town government, no further action was necessary to incorporate. This practice can lead to inconsistencies in the dates of incorporation for towns in this region. Dates given in reference sources sometimes reflect the date when the town was chartered, which may have been long before it was settled, and not the date when its town government became active. In other parts of New England, some "future towns" were laid out along these lines, but such areas would not be formally incorporated as towns until they were sufficiently settled to organize a town government.

A typical town in the northern three states was laid out in a 6-by-6-mile (9.7 by 9.7 km) square. Each contained 36 sections, 1 mile (1.6 km) squares or 640 acres (260 ha). One section was reserved for the support of public schools. This was copied when the Continental Congress laid out Ohio in 1785–87.

Many early towns covered very large amounts of land. Once areas had become settled, new towns were sometimes formed by breaking areas away from the original existing towns. This was an especially common practice during the 18th and early 19th centuries. More heavily populated areas were often subdivided on multiple occasions. As a result, towns and cities in urbanized areas are often smaller in terms of land area than an average town in a rural area. Formation of new towns in this manner slowed in the later part of the 19th century and early part of the 20th century, however. One late instance was the separation of Sugar Hill, New Hampshire, from the town of Lisbon in 1962. It has not taken place anywhere in New England in the last fifty years; boundary changes of any type are fairly rare.

== Other types of municipalities in New England ==
Towns are the basic building block of the New England municipality system, although several other types of municipalities also exist. Every New England state has cities. In addition, Maine also has a unique type of entity called a plantation. Beneath the town level, Connecticut has incorporated boroughs, and Vermont has incorporated villages.

=== Cities ===
In addition to towns, every New England state has incorporated cities. However, cities are treated in the same manner as towns under state law, differing from towns only in their form of government. Most cities are former towns that changed to a city form of government because they grew too large to have a town meeting as its legislative body; instead, a city's legislative body is an elected representative body, typically called the city council or town council or board of aldermen. City governments are typically administered by a mayor (and/or city manager). In common speech, people often generically refer to communities of either type as "towns", drawing no distinction between the two.

The presence of incorporated boroughs in Connecticut and incorporated villages in Vermont has influenced the evolution of cities in those states. In Connecticut in particular, the historical development of cities was quite different from in the other New England states, and at least technically, the relationship between towns and cities is today different from elsewhere in New England. Just as boroughs in Connecticut overlay towns, so do cities; for example, while Hartford is commonly thought of as a city, it is coextensive and consolidated with the Town of Hartford; governed by a single governmental entity with the powers and responsibilities of the Town being carried out by the entity referred to as the City of Hartford. In legal theory though not in current practice Connecticut cities and boroughs could be coextensive (covering the same geography as the town) without being consolidated (a single government); also a borough or city can span more than one town. In practice, though, most cities in Connecticut today do not function any differently from their counterparts elsewhere in New England. See the section below on boroughs and villages for more background on this topic.

There are far fewer cities in New England than there are towns, although cities are more common in heavily built-up areas, and most of the largest municipalities in the region are titled as cities. Across New England as a whole, only about 5% of all incorporated municipalities are cities. Cities are more common in the three southern New England states, which are much more densely populated, than they are in the three northern New England states. In early colonial times, all incorporated municipalities in New England were towns; there were no cities. Springfield, Massachusetts, for instance, was settled as a "plantation" (in colonial Massachusetts, the term was synonymous with town) as early as 1636, but the city of Springfield was not established until 1852.

The oldest cities in New England date to the last few decades of the 18th century, (e.g. New Haven, Connecticut, was chartered as a city in 1784). In New England, cities were not widespread until well into the 19th century. New Hampshire did not have any cities until the 1840s, and for many years prior to the 1860s Vermont had just one city. Even Massachusetts, historically New England's most populous state, did not have any cities until 1822, when Boston was granted a city form of government by the state legislature.

In most of New England, population is not a determining factor for what makes a city or town, and there are many examples of towns with larger populations than nearby cities. Massachusetts is one of the few states in the region that is an exception to this rule; the Massachusetts Constitution requires a town to have a population of at least 10,000 people before it can switch its government from a town meeting form to a city form. Nevertheless, even without a hard and fast population limit for city status, the practical threshold to become a city seems to be higher in the three southern New England states than in the three northern New England states. In Massachusetts, Connecticut and Rhode Island, almost every city has at least 10,000 people, and all but a few have at least 20,000. In Maine, New Hampshire and Vermont, however, there are a number of cities with fewer than 10,000 people, and there are five (three in Maine and two in Vermont) with fewer than 5,000.

Over time, some of the distinctions between a town and a city have become blurred. Since the early 20th century, towns have been allowed to modify the town meeting form of government in various ways (e.g., representative town meeting, adding a town manager). In recent decades, some towns have adopted what effectively amount to city forms of government, although they still refer to themselves as towns. As a practical matter, one municipality that calls itself a town and another that calls itself a city may have exactly the same governmental structure. With these changes in town government, a reluctance to adopt the title of city seems to have developed, and few towns have officially done so since the early 20th century. In Massachusetts, ten municipalities (Amherst, Agawam, Barnstable, Braintree, Franklin, Palmer, Randolph, Southbridge, West Springfield and Weymouth) have adopted Mayor-Council or Council-Manager forms of government in their home rule charters, and are therefore considered to be legally cities, but nevertheless continue to call themselves "towns". They are sometimes referred to in legislation and other legal documents as "the city known as the Town of ..." Greenfield, in December 2017, dropped the "town" designation, which some called "embarrassing" and which legislators said made paperwork more difficult. Common parlance labeling a community a "city" or a "town" may have more to do with its size, whether its current size or its historical size and reputation.

=== Plantations ===
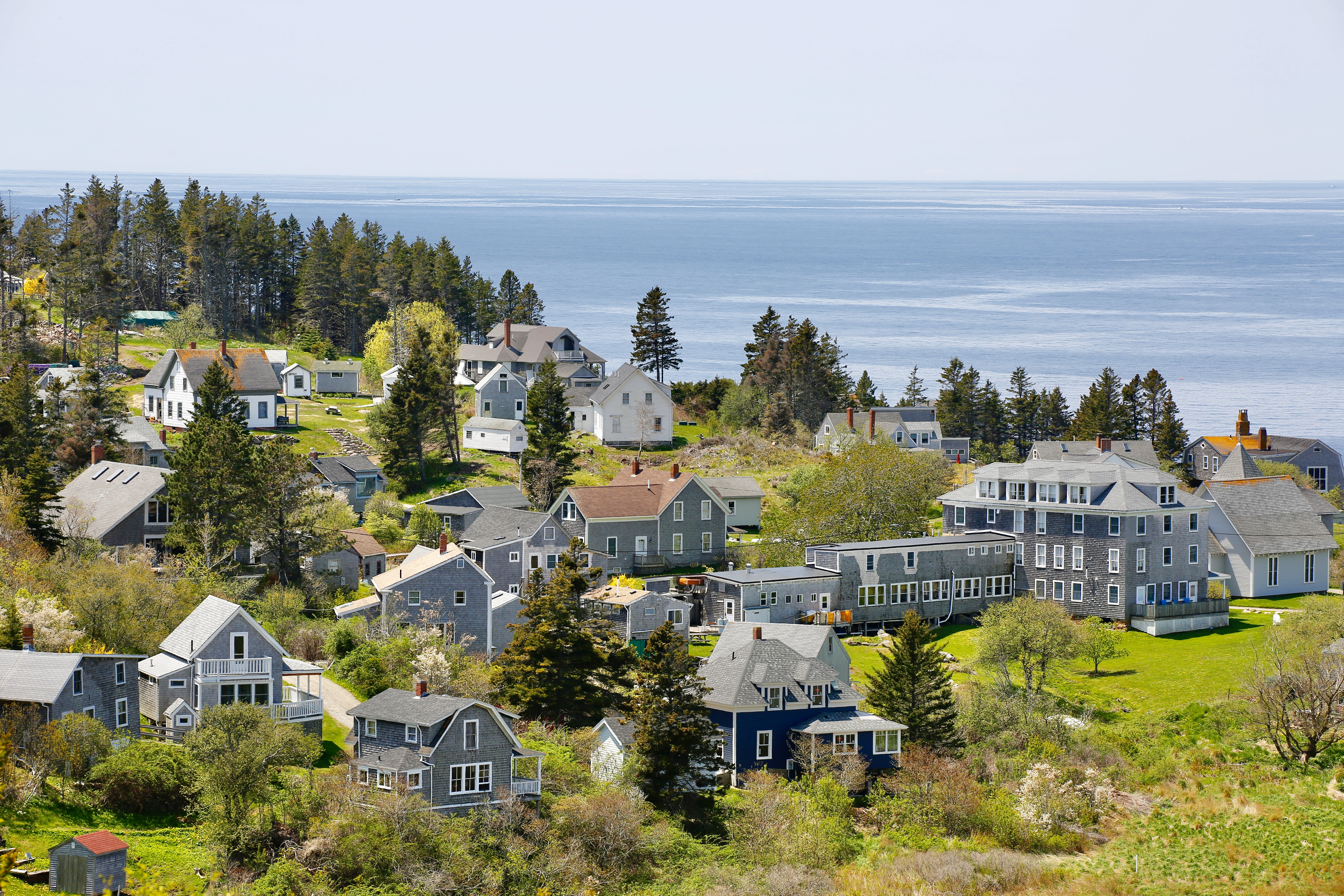
Monhegan is a plantation in Maine.

In addition to towns and cities, Maine has a third type of town-like municipality not found in any other New England state, the plantation. A plantation is, in essence, a town-like community that does not have enough population to require full town government or services. Plantations are organized at the county level and typically found in sparsely populated areas. There is no bright-line population divider between a town and a plantation, but no plantation currently has any more than about 300 residents. Plantations are considered to be "organized" but not "incorporated." Not all counties have them; in some southern counties, all territory is sufficiently populated to be covered by a town or a city.

In colonial times, Massachusetts also used the term "plantation" for a community in a pre-town stage of development (Maine originally got the term from Massachusetts, as Maine was part of Massachusetts until 1820, when it became a state via the Missouri Compromise). The term "plantation" had not been much used in Massachusetts since the 18th century. Massachusetts also once had "districts", which served much the same purpose. They were considered to be incorporated, but lacked the full privileges of a town. On August 23, 1775, in order for more representation for the Revolutionary War, 36 towns in Massachusetts and 6 in Maine were incorporated, effectively eliminating the district meaning. Maine and Rhode Island are also known to have made limited use of the district concept. Districts have not been at all common since the first half of the 19th century, and there have not been any districts anywhere in New England in over a century. Maine is the only New England state that currently has a significant amount of territory that is not sufficiently populated to support town governments; thus, it is the only New England state that still needs the plantation type of municipality.

For a historical example in New Hampshire, see Plantation number four.

=== Boroughs and villages ===
Most areas of New England never developed municipal forms based on the compact populated place concept. This contrasts with states with civil townships, which typically have extensive networks of villages or boroughs that carve out or overlay the townships.

Two of the New England states do have general-purpose municipalities of this type, however, to at least a limited extent. Connecticut has incorporated boroughs, and Vermont has incorporated villages. Such areas remain a part of their parent town, but assume some responsibilities for municipal services within their boundaries. In both states, they are typically regarded as less important than towns, and both seem to be in decline as institutions. In recent decades, many boroughs and villages have disincorporated, reverting to full town control.

The term "village" is sometimes used in New England to describe a distinct, built-up place within a town or city. This may be a town center, which bears the same name as the town or city (almost every town has such a place), or a name related to that of the town, or a completely unrelated name. The town of Barnstable, Massachusetts, for example, includes the villages of Barnstable Village, West Barnstable, Centerville, Marstons Mills, Osterville, Cotuit, and Hyannis. Except for the incorporated villages in Vermont, these "villages" are not incorporated municipalities and should not be understood as such. Towns do sometimes grant a certain measure of recognition to such areas, using highway signs that identify them as "villages", for example. These informal "villages" also sometimes correspond to underlying special-purpose districts such as fire or water districts, which are separately incorporated quasi-municipal entities that provide specific services within a part of a town — within Barnstable, the seven villages correspond to districts for fire, water, sewer and elementary schooling, for instance. (In Maine and New Hampshire, the term "village corporation" is used for a type of special-purpose district.) Many villages also are recognized as places by the United States Postal Service (some villages have their own post offices, with their names used in mailing addresses) or the United States Census Bureau (which recognizes some villages as census-designated places and tabulates census data for them). Towns with an example of the former, such as Richmond, Rhode Island, do not have a post office themselves, but instead use villages in town or villages in nearby towns as a mailing address. This leads to a weaker town identification in such towns, with residents more strongly identifying with the village they live in. However, villages or CDPs have no existence as general-purpose municipalities separate from the town (if they even have any legal existence at all), and are usually regarded by local residents as a part of the town in which they are located, less important than the whole.

It is possible for a Connecticut borough or Vermont village to become a city. In Connecticut, cities overlay towns just as boroughs do, and, just like a borough, a city can cover only a portion of a town rather than being coextensive with the town. This is rare today—only one or two examples remain—but it was more common in the past. At least one borough historically spanned more than one town: the borough of Danielsonville originally laid over parts of Killingly and Brooklyn, until the Brooklyn portion petitioned to be reorganized as a fire district, and concurrently the Killingly portion was reconfigured with its present boundaries and renamed Danielson by the General Assembly. There are no legal restrictions in Connecticut that would prevent a city or borough today from similarly overlaying the territory of more than one town, provided it is not consolidated with one of the underlying towns. Cities developed earlier in Connecticut than in the other New England states, and were originally based on the borough concept. At one time, all cities were non-coextensive; the practice of making cities coextensive with their towns was a later adaptation intended to mimic the city concept that had emerged in the other New England states. Over time, many non-coextensive cities have expanded to become coextensive with their parent town. As with boroughs, many have also disincorporated and reverted to full town control. These two trends have combined to make non-coextensive cities very rare in recent times; the only one currently incorporated is the city of Groton, located in the southwestern part of the town of Groton, Connecticut.

In Vermont, if a village becomes a city, it does not continue to overlay its parent town, but breaks away and becomes a completely separate municipality. Most cities in Vermont today are actually former villages rather than former towns, and are much smaller than a typical town in terms of land area. The above process has created several instances where there are adjacent towns and cities with the same name. In all cases, the city was originally the "town center" of the town, but later incorporated as a city and became a separate municipality.

== Unorganized territory ==
All three of the northern New England states (Vermont, New Hampshire, and Maine) contain some areas that are unincorporated and unorganized, not part of any town, city or plantation. Maine has significantly more such area than the other two states. Most such areas are located in very sparsely populated regions. Much of the barely inhabited interior of Maine is unorganized, for example.

The majority of the unincorporated areas in New Hampshire are in Coos County, and the majority of the unincorporated areas in Vermont are in Essex County. Two additional counties in New Hampshire and three additional counties in Vermont contain smaller amounts of unincorporated territory. In Maine, eight of the state's sixteen counties contain significant amounts of unorganized territory (in essence, those counties in the northern and interior parts of the state). Four other counties contain smaller amounts.

Most of these areas have no local government at all; indeed, some have no permanent population whatsoever. Some areas have a very rudimentary organization that does not rise to the level of an organized general-purpose municipal government (e.g., a town clerk's office exists for the purpose of conducting elections for state or federal offices). In general, unorganized areas fall into one of the three categories below.

=== Gores and similar entities ===
During the 17th, 18th and 19th centuries, as town boundaries were being drawn up, small areas would sometimes be left over, not included in any town. Typically smaller than a normal-sized town, these areas were known by a variety of names, including gores, grants, locations, purchases, surpluses, and strips. Sometimes these areas were not included in any town due to survey errors (which is the technical meaning of the term "gore"). Sometimes they represent small areas that were left over when a particular region was carved into towns, not large enough to be a town on their own. Some appear to have simply been granted outside the usual town structure, sometimes in areas where it was probably not contemplated that towns would ever develop. Over time, those located in more populated areas were, in general, annexed to neighboring towns or incorporated as towns in their own right. No such areas exist today in Massachusetts, Connecticut or Rhode Island, but some remain in New Hampshire, Vermont and Maine.

- New Hampshire: Coos County contains a total of seventeen grants, purchases and locations. Together, these cover a significant amount of land area, but had only 61 residents as of the 2000 Census (44 of whom lived in a single entity, Wentworth Location). The only remaining unincorporated gore-like entity outside of Coos County is Hale's Location, in neighboring Carroll County, a 2.5-square-mile (6.5 km^{2}) tract, which has reported population in only three censuses since 1900. (Hart's Location, also in Carroll County, has been incorporated since 1795, although it continues to carry the word "location" in its name. Wentworth Location was similarly incorporated as a town at one time.)
- Vermont: Essex County contains two gores and one grant, which border each other in the northern part of the county. Together, they cover about 25 square miles (65 km^{2}), and reported 10 residents in the 2000 Census. The only remaining unincorporated gore-like entity outside of Essex County is Buel's Gore, in Chittenden County, a 5-square-mile (13 km^{2}) tract, which reported 30 residents in 2010. Up until the 1960s or 1970s, Franklin County contained a gore as well, which was ultimately eliminated by dividing it between two neighboring towns.
- Maine: the interior of the state contains a number of entities of this type. There are a few remaining in more populated areas of the state as well. Examples include Hibberts Gore, in Lincoln County, and Batchelders Grant, in southern Oxford County.

=== Unorganized townships ===
All three of the northern New England states contain some town-sized unorganized entities, referred to as "unorganized townships" (sometimes, just "townships") or "unorganized towns". Most of these are areas that were drawn up on maps in the 18th and 19th centuries as what might be termed "future towns", but never saw enough settlement to actually commence operation of a formal town government.

- New Hampshire: Coös County contains six unorganized townships that do not appear to have ever been actively incorporated. Their collective population in the 2000 Census was 114, most of whom lived in one of two townships (Dixville and Millsfield). There are no other unorganized townships in the state that have never been incorporated.
- Vermont: Essex County contains three unorganized townships that do not appear to have ever been actively incorporated. Their collective population in the 2000 Census was 41. There are no other unorganized townships in the state that have never been incorporated.
- Maine: the interior of Maine contains hundreds of unorganized townships, most of which have never been incorporated or organized. Much of the interior of Maine is divided into surveyed townships that are identified only by letters and numbers that indicate their position on a grid. These were probably never seriously intended to ever become towns.

=== Disincorporated towns ===
All three of the northern New England states also include at least one unorganized township that was once a town but has disincorporated and reverted to unorganized territory, generally due to population loss. Maine also has some unorganized townships that were once organized as plantations.

- New Hampshire: The town of Livermore, located in a mountainous area of Grafton County, disincorporated in 1951. Livermore reported no population in its final census as an incorporated town (1950), and has reported no more than three residents in any census since then. Most of its territory is now part of White Mountain National Forest. Since it was once incorporated as a town, Wentworth Location could also be put into this category. Wentworth Location disincorporated in 1966; its population in the 1970 Census was 37. The town of Gosport was established on the Isles of Shoals in 1715, but the population was evacuated during the American Revolutionary War, and the isles were largely abandoned until the mid-19th century. The isles are now split between Maine and New Hampshire with no permanent population, and the New Hampshire islands are now part of the town of Rye.
- Vermont: The towns of Glastenbury and Somerset, located in the Green Mountains on opposite sides of the Bennington-Windham County line, disincorporated in 1937. In the 1940 Census, Glastenbury reported five residents, Somerset four. In only one census since then has the population of either reached double digits.
- Maine: Dozens of towns and plantations have surrendered their municipal organization over the years and reverted to unorganized territory. An especially large number of municipal dissolutions took place between 1935 and 1945, but some have also occurred before and after that time period. Recent town disincorporations include Centerville (2004), Madrid (2000) and Greenfield (1993). The most recent plantations to surrender their organization were Prentiss Plantation and E Plantation, both in 1990.
- Massachusetts: The towns of Dana, Prescott, Greenwich and Enfield were disincorporated in 1938 to make way for the Quabbin Reservoir. Their territory was divided up between the neighboring towns and did not produce newly unincorporated land. In the 1860s to the early 1910s, many towns around Boston became annexed to the city. These towns included Dorchester, Roxbury, Charlestown, Brighton, Hyde Park, and West Roxbury. In addition, Bradford was annexed into Haverhill in 1897.

Maine has significantly more unorganized territory than Vermont or New Hampshire. Fewer than 100 Vermont residents and fewer than 250 New Hampshire residents live in unorganized areas. In Maine, by contrast, about 10,000 residents live in unorganized areas. As a result, Maine has developed more of an infrastructure for administration of unincorporated and unorganized areas than the other New England states. The existence of this fallback probably explains why Maine has had significantly more towns disincorporated over the years than any other New England state. There have been numerous instances of towns in Maine disincorporating despite populations that numbered in the hundreds. While these were not large communities, they were large enough to realistically operate a town government if they wanted to, but simply elected not to. In Vermont and New Hampshire, disincorporation has, in general, not been brought up for discussion unless a town's population has approached single digits.

=== Coastal waters ===
In general, coastal waters in the New England states are administered directly by either state or federal agencies and are not part of any town. Several towns, however, have chosen to include all or part of their corresponding coastal waters in their territory. Coastal waters include human-made structures built within them. In Connecticut, for example, an artificial, uninhabited island in Long Island Sound at the boundary with New York State, housing the Stratford Shoal Light, is not part of any town and is administered directly by the United States Coast Guard. In general, inhabited minor off-shore islands are administered as part of a nearby town and in some cases, are their own independent towns, such as the town of Gosnold, Massachusetts, which encompasses the Elizabeth Islands.

== Census ==
=== Towns ===
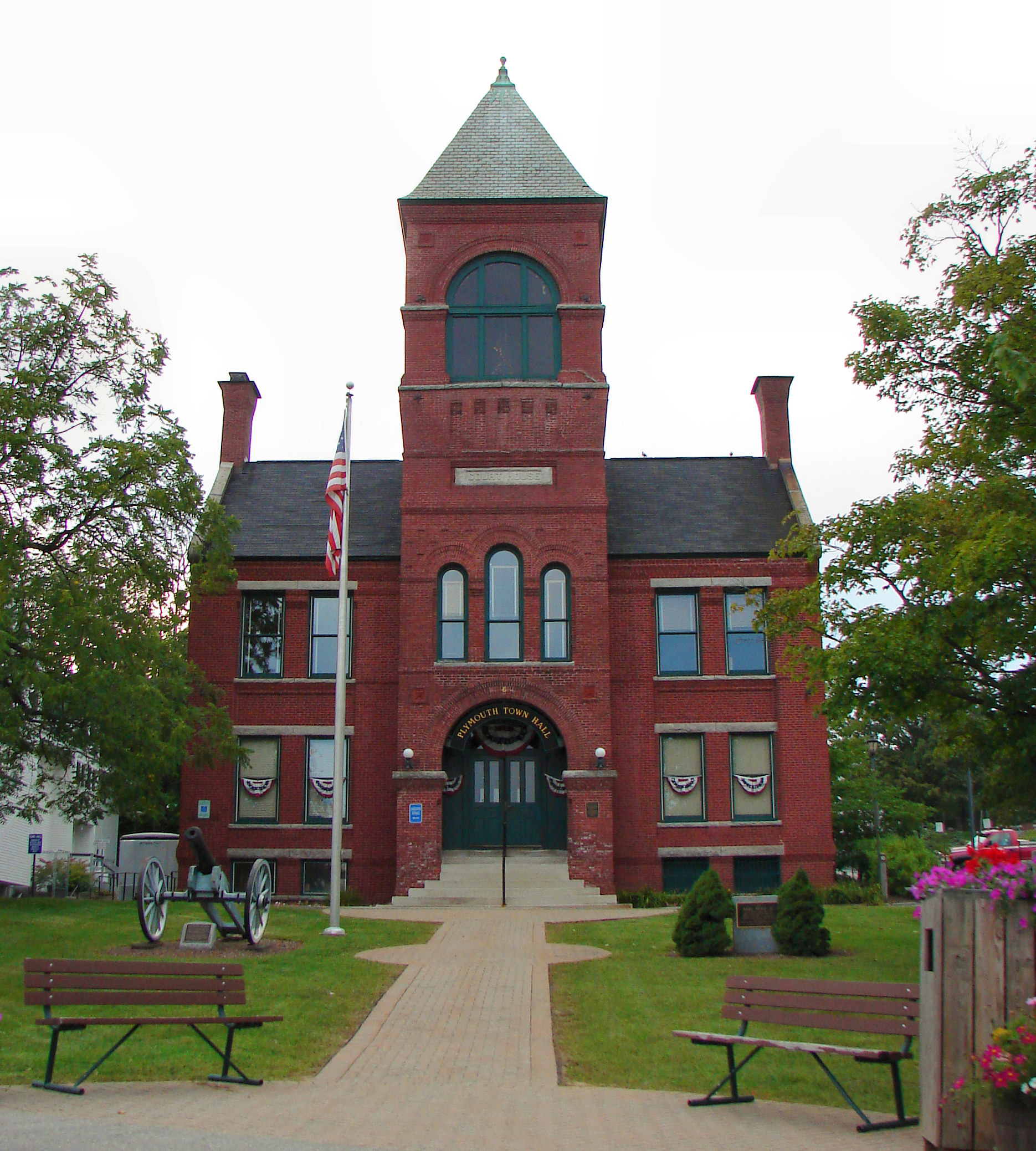
The town hall of Plymouth, New Hampshire

Unlike municipalities in most other states, the United States Census Bureau does not classify New England towns as "incorporated places". They are instead classified as "minor civil divisions" (MCDs), the same category into which civil townships fall. The Census Bureau classifies New England towns in this manner because they are conceptually similar to civil townships from a geographic standpoint, typically exhibiting similar population-distribution patterns. Like civil townships, but unlike most incorporated municipalities in other states, New England towns do not usually represent a single compact populated place. Plantations in Maine are similarly classified as MCDs.

That New England towns serve, in essence, the same function as incorporated places in other states, but are not treated as incorporated places by the Census Bureau, can be a source of confusion. The Census classifications should not be understood to imply that New England towns are not incorporated, or necessarily serve a similar purpose to MCDs in other states in terms of governmental function or civic-identity importance. New England towns are classified as MCDs not because they are not "incorporated" but rather the data that the census gathers on places is analyzed based on different models (those of compact settled places and open rural places) that is not well represented by the New England Town system of organization. In order to better fit their own purposes, the Census only counts cities and certain fully urbanized towns as "places" in its categorization. In other towns, those with small built-up central villages, the Census designates one or more census-designated places (CDPs) and considers all other land to be parts of "minor civil divisions". This classification is done only for the Census's own data analysis, and otherwise has no connection to the actual organization or legal status of New England towns.

The census bureau did uniquely recognize towns, however, in that it formerly classified metropolitan areas in New England on the basis of town boundaries rather than county boundaries as it does in other parts of the U.S. Unique to New England was the New England City and Town Area (NECTA), which was analogous to Metropolitan Statistical Areas in other parts of the U.S., except that it used the town as its basic unit rather than the county. Delineation of NECTAs was discontinued effective July 2023.

=== Cities ===
Even though the Census Bureau does not treat New England towns as "incorporated places", it does classify cities in New England as such. The rationale behind this is that cities are likely to be more thoroughly built-up and therefore more readily comparable to cities in other states than towns are. Boroughs in Connecticut and incorporated villages in Vermont are also treated as incorporated places.

That New England states, in general, regard cities and towns on equal footing, yet they are handled in two different ways by the Census Bureau, can be another source of confusion. The Census classifications should not be understood to imply that cities are incorporated but towns are not, or that cities and towns represent two fundamentally different types of entities. The Census classifies New England municipalities strictly based on whether they are towns or cities, with no regard to the actual population-distribution pattern in a particular municipality. All municipalities titled as cities are classified as incorporated places, even if their population-distribution pattern is no different from that of a typical town; towns are never classified as incorporated places, even if they are thoroughly built up. The ambiguity over whether certain municipalities in Massachusetts should be classified as cities or towns, and the Census Bureau's inconsistent handling of these municipalities (see the Statistics and Superlatives section below), further blurs matters.

=== Census-designated places ===
To fill in some of the "place" data, the Census Bureau sometimes recognizes census-designated places (CDPs) within New England towns. These often correspond to town centers or other villages, although not all such areas are recognized as CDPs. In cases where a town is entirely or almost entirely built-up, the Census sometimes recognizes a CDP which is coextensive with the entire town. CDPs are only recognized within towns, not cities. Because the primary role of CDPs is to establish "place" data for communities located in unincorporated areas, a CDP cannot be within an incorporated place. Since the Census Bureau recognizes New England cities as incorporated places, a CDP cannot be within a city.

Data users from outside New England should be aware that New Englanders usually think in terms of entire towns (i.e., MCD data), making CDP data of marginal local interest. Since virtually all territory in New England outside of Maine is incorporated, CDPs do not really serve the same purpose as they do elsewhere; CDPs in New England invariably represent territory that is not "unincorporated", but part of a larger incorporated town. The extent to which such an area has its own distinct identity can vary, but is not usually as strong as identification with the town as a whole. There are numerous instances where the Census Bureau recognizes the built-up area around a town center as a CDP, resulting in a CDP that bears the same name as the town. In these cases, data for the CDP is, in general, meaningless to local residents, who seldom draw any particular distinction between the built-up area around the town center and outlying areas of the town. A local source citing data for such a community will almost always use the data for the entire town, not the CDP.

At the same time, not all built-up places with significant populations are recognized as CDPs. The Census Bureau has historically recognized relatively few CDPs within urbanized areas in particular. Many towns located in such areas do not contain any recognized CDPs and will thus be completely absent from Census materials presenting the population of "places". Greenwich, Connecticut, is one prominent example. While the Town of Greenwich appears in MCD materials, the Census Bureau does not recognize Greenwich as a "place".

=== Unorganized areas ===
In New Hampshire and Vermont, the Census Bureau treats each individual unorganized entity (township, gore, grant, etc.) as an MCD. In Maine, it seems, due to the extent of unorganized area, the Census Bureau typically lumps contiguous townships, gores, and the like together into larger units called "unorganized territories" (UTs), which are then treated as MCDs. In a few cases in Maine where a township or gore does not border any other unorganized land, it is treated as its own MCD rather than being folded into a larger UT.

In theory, a CDP could probably be defined within an MCD representing an unorganized area. Due to the extremely sparse population in most such areas, however, there are few if any cases in which the Census Bureau has actually done so.

== List of New England towns ==
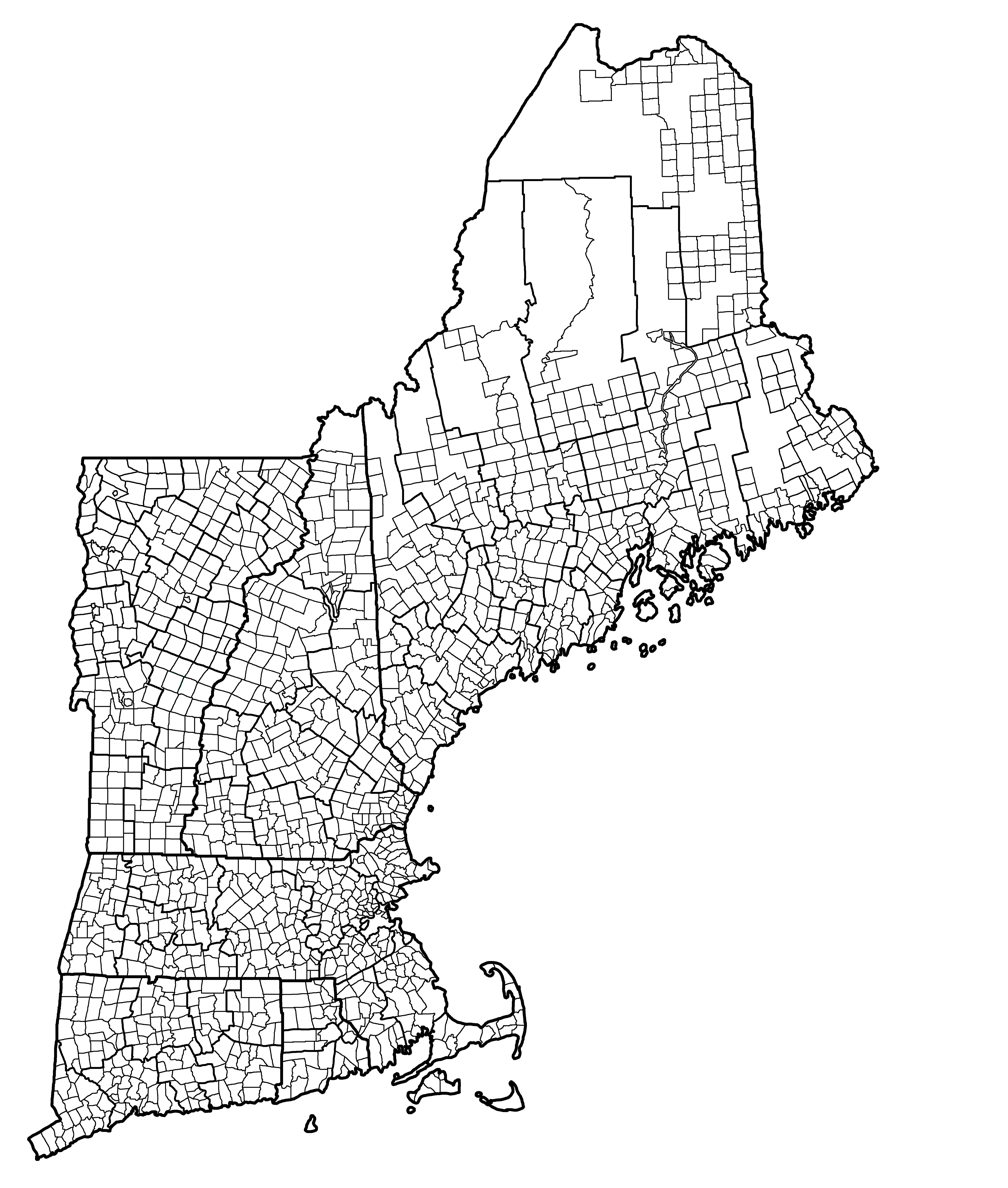
New England towns

For a list of all New England towns and other town-level municipalities, see the following articles:

- List of municipalities in Connecticut
- List of municipalities in Maine
- List of municipalities in Massachusetts
- List of municipalities in New Hampshire
- List of municipalities in Rhode Island
- List of municipalities in Vermont

== Statistics ==
Note: All population statistics are from the 2020 United States census.

=== Connecticut ===
Towns (light gray) and cities (dark gray) of Connecticut

Connecticut contains 169 incorporated towns. Put into terms that are equivalent to the other New England states, 20 are cities/boroughs and 149 are towns. (As discussed in the Cities section of Other types of municipalities in New England above, the relationship between towns and cities in Connecticut is different from the other New England states, at least on paper; thus, in the technical sense, all 169 of the above municipalities are really towns, with 20 overlaid by a coextensive city or borough of the same name.) Together, these 169 municipalities cover the entire state. There is no unincorporated territory, but, as in all New England states, there are a fair number of unincorporated, named communities that lie within the incorporated territory of a municipality.

Connecticut is one of two New England states to have any type of incorporated general-purpose municipality below the town level, namely incorporated boroughs (Vermont has incorporated villages). There are nine remaining in the state, with one, Naugatuck, having consolidated with the town. Additionally, the US Census Bureau treats Groton Long Point as a borough, as an act of the state legislature gives it the same powers as a borough, although it has never formally organized as one. They were once more numerous. Many of those that remain are very small. Connecticut also has at least one remaining city (Groton) that is within, but not coextensive with, its parent town. A second non-coextensive city, Winsted, still exists on paper, but its government has been consolidated with that of the town of Winchester for many years, making it more of a special-purpose district than a true municipality. Winsted is no longer recognized by the Census Bureau as an incorporated place, although data is tabulated for a Census Designated Place that is coextensive with that of the original city.

- The largest municipality in Connecticut, by population, is the city of Bridgeport (pop. 148,654).
- The largest that is a town and not a city is West Hartford (pop. 64,083).
- The smallest that is a city and not a town, only including cities that are coextensive with their towns, is Derby (pop. 12,325). The city-within-a-town of Groton, however, is smaller (pop. 9,387), and to the extent that Winsted is recognized as a non-coextensive city, it is even smaller than Groton is (pop. 7,192).
- The smallest town is Union (pop. 785).
- The largest municipality by land area is the town of New Milford (61.6 square miles (160 km^{2})).
- The smallest town-level municipality is Derby (5.06 square miles (13.1 km^{2})).

=== Maine ===
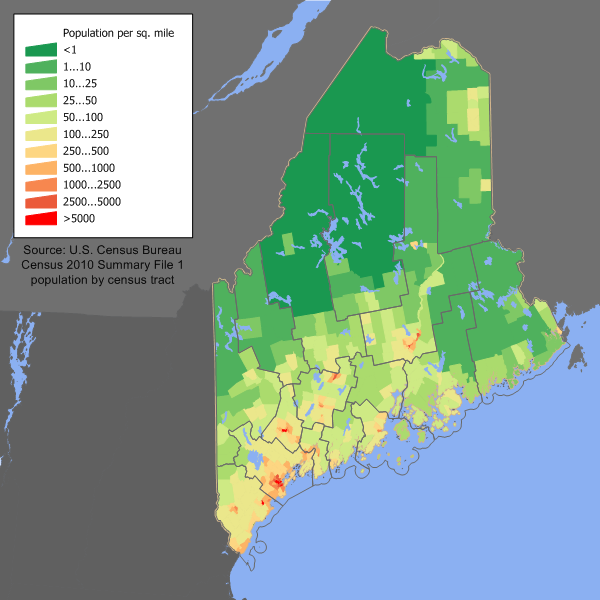
2010 Maine population density map

As of the 2020 census, Maine contains 485 organized municipalities, of which 23 are incorporated as cities, 430 are incorporated as towns, and the remaining 32 are organized as plantations. These 485 organized municipalities together cover much of, but not all of, the state's territory. Of Maine's sixteen counties, only four are entirely incorporated. Four other counties are almost entirely incorporated, but include small amounts of unincorporated/unorganized territory (three of these four counties were entirely incorporated or organized at one time, but lost that status when a town disincorporated or a plantation surrendered its organization). The remaining eight counties contain significant amounts of unincorporated/unorganized territory. Most of these areas are in very sparsely populated regions, however. Only about 1.3% of the state's population lives in areas not part of a town, city, or plantation.

(Since the 2000 Census, two towns, Madrid and Centerville, have disincorporated. Thus, at the time of the 2000 Census, Maine had 22 cities, 434 towns, and 34 plantations, for a total of 490 organized municipalities. Also since the 2010 Census, Sanford adopted a new charter that included designation as a city.)

- The largest municipality in Maine, by population, is the city of Portland (pop. 68,408).
- The largest that is a town and not a city is Scarborough (pop. 22,135).
- The smallest that is a city and not a town is Eastport (pop. 1,288).
- The smallest town is Frenchboro (pop. 29).
- The largest municipality by land area is the town of Allagash (128.6 square miles (333 km^{2})).
- The smallest is the island plantation of Monhegan (0.85 square miles (2.2 km^{2})).

=== Massachusetts ===
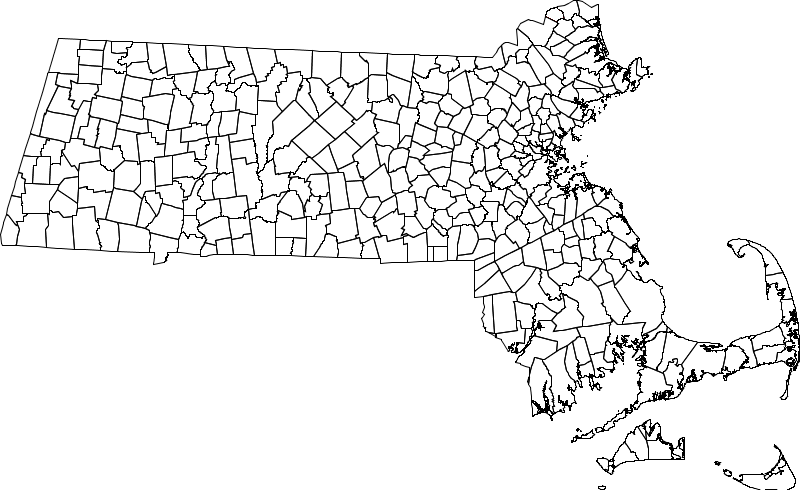
Massachusetts cities and towns. All territory of the state is within the bounds of a municipal corporation.

Massachusetts contains 351 municipal corporations, consisting of cities and towns. These 351 municipalities together encompass the entire territory of Massachusetts; there is no area that is outside the bounds of a municipality. Using usual American terminology, there is no "unincorporated" land in Massachusetts.

Of the 351 municipalities, the number that are cities and the number that are towns is a matter of some ambiguity. Depending on which source is consulted, anywhere from 39 to 53 are cities. The ambiguity is the result of questions around the legal status of municipalities that have since the 1970s, through home-rule petition, adopted corporate charters approved by the state legislature with forms of government that resemble city government and do not include elements traditionally associated with town government (especially, a board of selectmen and a town meeting). Of the fourteen communities that have done so, all but three call themselves a "town" in their municipal operations, and are usually referred to by residents as "towns", but the Massachusetts Secretary of the Commonwealth's Office considers all fourteen to be legally cities. Other sources within state government often refer to all fourteen municipalities as towns, however. The U.S. Census Bureau listed all as towns through the 1990 Census. For the 2000 Census, some were listed by the Federal government as towns and some as cities, a situation that continues in Census materials since 2000. Massachusetts appears to be the only New England state where this issue has arisen, though other New England states also have municipalities that have adopted what amounts to city forms of government but continue to call themselves "towns". In the other New England states, it does not appear that any need to officially label such municipalities as "cities" has been identified.

For purposes of determining the "largest town" and "smallest city", in this article, only the 42 municipalities that title themselves as cities are recognized as cities. This includes the 39 cities that adopted city forms of government through pre-home rule procedures. The other 309 municipalities in the state are treated as towns below. The same classification is used for identifying Massachusetts cities on the list of New England towns and its attendant pages with historical census population statistics.

For further information, see this section of Massachusetts government.

- The largest municipality in Massachusetts by population is the city of Boston (pop. 675,647).
- The smallest that is a city and not a town is Palmer (pop. 12,448).
- The largest that is a town and not a city is Brookline (pop. 63,191).
- The smallest overall is the town of Gosnold (pop. 70).
- The largest municipality by land area is the town of Plymouth (96.4 square miles (250 km^{2})).
- The smallest town by land area is the town of Nahant (1.08 square miles (2.8 km^{2})).

=== New Hampshire ===
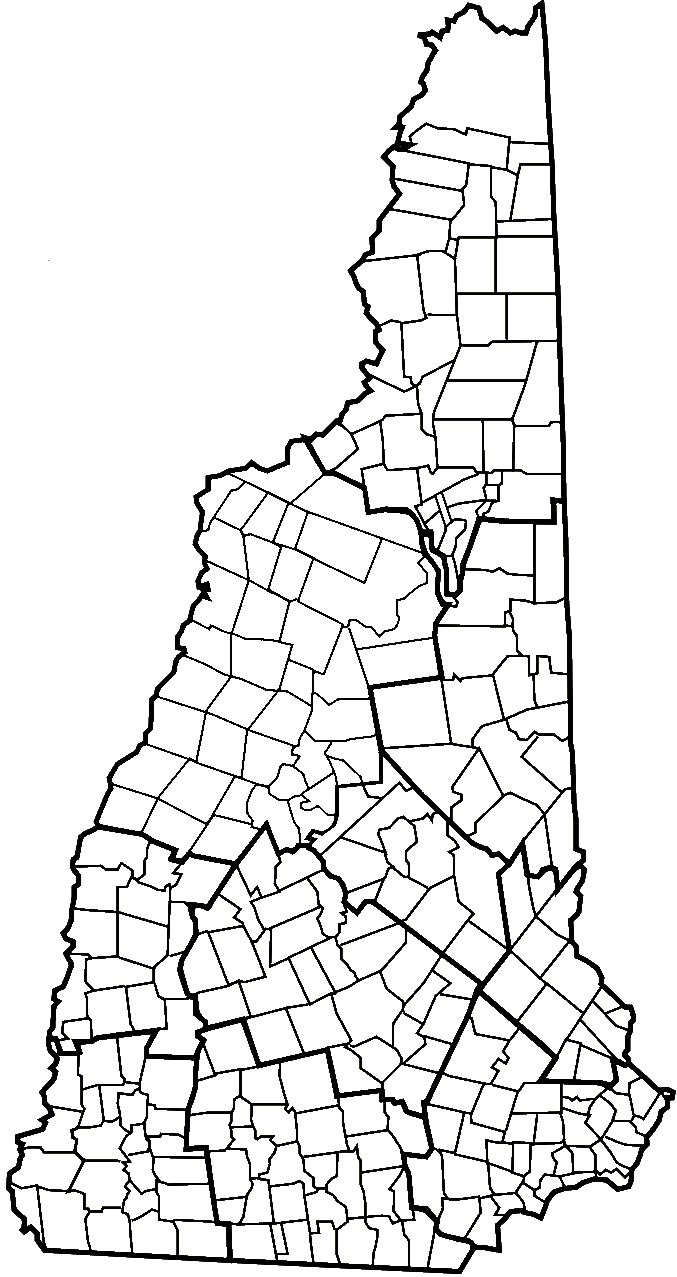
Map of New Hampshire municipalities

New Hampshire contains 234 incorporated towns and cities. Thirteen are cities and 221 are towns. These 234 municipalities together cover the vast majority of, but not all of, the state's territory. There are some unincorporated areas in the sparsely populated northern region of the state. Most of the unincorporated areas are in Coos County, the state's northernmost county. Carroll and Grafton counties also contain smaller amounts of unincorporated territory. This territory includes seven unincorporated townships and an assortment of gores, grants, purchases, and locations. The remaining seven counties in the state are entirely incorporated (Grafton County was also fully incorporated at one time, but lost that status when one of its towns disincorporated). Fewer than 250 of the state's residents live in unincorporated areas.

- The largest municipality in New Hampshire, by population, is the city of Manchester (pop. 115,644).
- The largest that is a town and not a city is Derry (pop. 34,317).
- The smallest that is a city and not a town is Franklin (pop. 8,741).
- The smallest incorporated municipality overall is the town of Hart's Location (pop. 68), which, despite its name, is an incorporated town.
- The largest municipality by land area is the town of Pittsburg (281.3 square miles (729 km^{2})).
- The smallest is the town of New Castle (0.81 square miles (2.1 km^{2})).

=== Rhode Island ===
Map of municipality level towns in Rhode Island

Rhode Island contains 39 incorporated towns and cities. Eight are cities and 31 are towns. These 39 municipalities together cover the entire state; there is no unincorporated territory.

- The largest municipality in Rhode Island, by population, is the city of Providence (pop. 190,934).
- The largest that is a town and not a city is Cumberland (pop. 36,405).
- The smallest that is a city and not a town is Central Falls (pop. 22,583).
- The smallest overall is the town of New Shoreham (pop. 1,410).
- The largest municipality by land area is Coventry (59.1 square miles (153 km^{2})).
- The smallest is Central Falls (1.19 square miles (3.1 km^{2})).

=== Vermont ===
Vermont contains 246 incorporated towns and cities, which together cover nearly all of the state's territory. Nine are cities and 237 are towns. There are some unincorporated areas in the sparsely populated mountainous regions of the state. Most of the unincorporated areas are in Essex County, in the northeastern part of the state. Bennington, Windham and Chittenden counties also contain smaller amounts of unincorporated territory. This territory includes five unincorporated townships and four gores and grants. The remaining ten counties in the state are entirely incorporated (Bennington and Windham counties were also fully incorporated at one time, but lost that status when a town disincorporated). Fewer than 100 of the state's residents live in unincorporated areas.

Vermont is one of two New England states to have any type of incorporated general-purpose municipality below the town level, namely incorporated villages (Connecticut has incorporated boroughs). There are 32 in the state. There were once nearly double that number.

- The largest municipality in Vermont, by population, is the city of Burlington (pop. 44,743).
- The largest which is a town and not a city is Colchester (pop. 17,524).
- The smallest which is a city and not a town is Vergennes (pop. 2,553).
- The smallest incorporated town is Victory (pop. 70).
- The largest municipality by land area is the town of Chittenden (72.7 square miles (188 km^{2})).
- The smallest town-level municipality is the city of Winooski (1.38 square miles (3.6 km^{2})).

== See also ==
- Minor civil division
- New England city and town area – U.S. Census statistical area and terminology for metropolitan areas using New England towns as building blocks, rather than counties
- Unincorporated community (New Jersey) – a concept for named localities within towns that are not separately incorporated, similar to a "village" in New England
