= E-class tram =

E-class tram may refer to:

- E-class Melbourne tram, built 2013-2021
- E-class Melbourne tram (1914)
- E-class Sydney tram, built 1901-1903

== See also ==
- E type Adelaide tram
