= Biggie (disambiguation) =

Biggie most commonly refers to American rapper The Notorious B.I.G. (1972–1997)

Biggie may also refer to:

== Nickname or stage name ==
- Biggie Butale, Botswanan politician
- Biggie Kapeta (1956–1999), Zimbabwean sculptor
- Biggie Tembo (1957–1995), Zimbabwean musician and member of Bhundu Boys
- Biggie Tembo Jr. (born 1988), Zimbabwean musician, son of Biggie Tembo
- Biggie Munn (1908–1975), American football coach
- Grover Simcox (1867–1966), American illustrator, naturalist, and polymath
- Marshall Goldberg (1917–2006), American football halfback

== Surname ==
- Barbara Biggie, American politician

== Characters ==
- Biggie, from the 1996 film Temptress Moon
- Biggie, a nickname given to Big Brother, only used in the Nigerian and South African versions.
- Biggie Cheese, a fictional mouse rapper from the 2006 animated film Barnyard: The Original Party Animals
- Biggie Knuft, from the 1972 novel The Water-Method Man by John Irving
- Biggie Smalls, from the 1975 film Let's Do It Again
- Biggie, a troll from the 2016 animated film Trolls

== Other uses ==
- Biggie, a size of drink and fries from Wendy's
- Biggie (convenience store), a Paraguayan convenience store chain

== See also ==
- Big (disambiguation)
- Big E (disambiguation)
- Biggy (disambiguation)
