= Class E =

Class E may refer to:

== Science and technology ==
- Class E amplifier, a power amplifier class in electronics
- Class E addresses, in a classful network, a type of Internet Protocol IP address
- Class E, twisted pair structured cabling system in the ISO/IEC 11801 standard

== Other uses ==
- Class E, an airspace class as defined by the ICAO
- Class E, a driver's license
- Class E felony, a category of crime in the US

== See also ==
- E class (disambiguation)
- Class (disambiguation)
- E (disambiguation)
- E-Type (disambiguation)
- Model E (disambiguation)
