= E-Type =

E-Type, Type E, or other variations may refer to:

- E-type asteroid, an asteroid thought to have an enstatite achondrite surface
- Victorian Railways E type carriage, a wooden express train passenger carriage
- E-Type (musician), a Swedish musician
- Jaguar E-Type, a British sports car
- E-Type (video game), a 1989 driving video game named for the car
- Audi Type E, a German passenger car
- Type E power plug and socket
- e-Types, Danish brand agency
- The E-Types, American garage rock band
- E type Adelaide tram

== See also ==
- E (disambiguation)
- TE (disambiguation)
- E class (disambiguation)
- E series (disambiguation)
- Model E (disambiguation)
- Type (disambiguation)
