= Haplogroup E =

Haplogroup E may refer to:

- Haplogroup E (mtDNA), a human mitochondrial DNA (mtDNA) haplogroup
- Haplogroup E (Y-DNA), a human Y-chromosome (Y-DNA) haplogroup

== See also ==
- Group E (disambiguation)
- E (disambiguation)
