= Vladimír Kokolia =

Czech poet, university teacher, writer, and painter (born 1956)

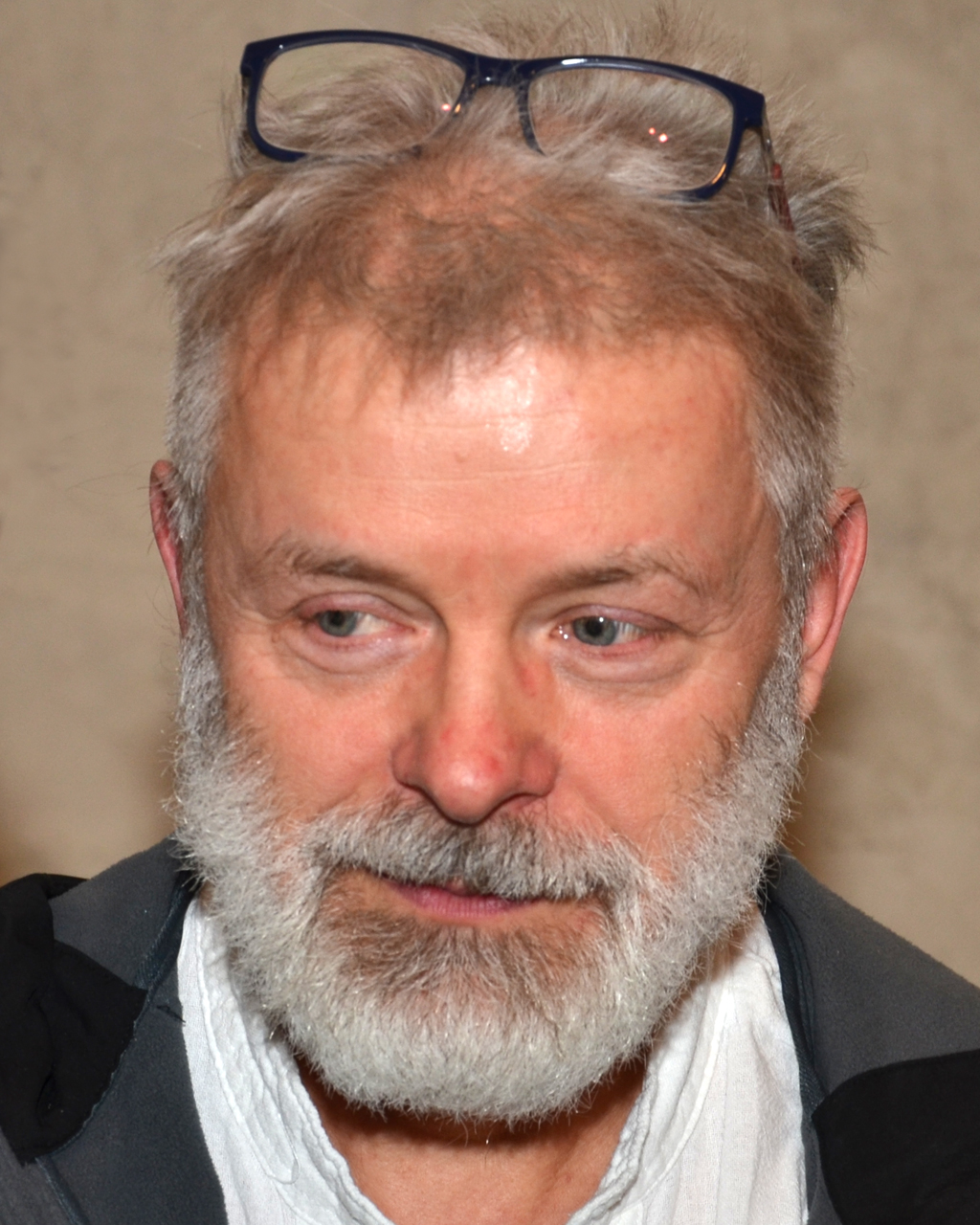
- Kokolia in 2018
- Born: 27 November 1956 (age 69); Brno, Czechoslovakia
- Education: Academy of Fine Arts in Prague
- Occupation: Poet; teacher; writer; painter
- Awards: Jindřich Chalupecký Award (1990)

Vladimír Kokolia (born 27 November 1956) is a Czech contemporary painter. Kokolia has also worked across a variety of other mediums, most notably printmaking and drawing, and is also a poet and musician.

== Academic work ==
Kokolia was educated at the Secondary School of Applied Arts in Uherské Hradiště. He then studied at the Academy of Fine Arts in Prague, going on to become a lecturer at the academy, and in 1992, the studio head lecturer in graphics. He was appointed to a professorship in 2006.

== Music ==
Kokolia was a singer and lyricist with the Czech alternative underground music group E in Brno from 1984 to 1997.

== Contemporary art ==
Kokolia's work has been included in a number of high+profile exhibitions. Between 1990 and 1991, he exhibited alongside Ivan Kafka and Tomas Ruller at the Museum of Modern Art in New York City. In 1990, he was the first recipient of the Jindřich Chalupecký Award for young artists.

Two of his works, Bez názvu (Untitled - 1990) (a colour linoprint and mixed media) and Barevny (Colourful - 1993) (a colour linocut), can also be found in the US National Gallery of Art collection.

Kokolia maintains a blog in Czech and a wiki called "Kokopedia". As of 2018 The wiki contains photographs of 35 graphics works, 23 drawings, 54 paintings, plus 9 watercolours, as well as 117 uncategorised pictures. There are also lyrics, articles, videos, and lists of people who are connected to Kokolia in some way.

From July until September 2018, a major exhibition of Kokolia's paintings took place at the Ikon Gallery in Birmingham, United Kingdom.
