= E! (disambiguation) =

E! is an American television network.

E! may also refer to:

== Television ==
- E! (Asian TV channel), the Asian franchise of E!
- E! (Australia and New Zealand), the Australian version of E!
- E! (Canadian TV channel), a Canadian cable/satellite television channel owned by Bell Media
- E! (Canadian TV system), a defunct (2001–2009) over-the-air television system operated by Canwest
- E! (European TV channel), the European version of E!
- E! (French TV channel), the French version of E!
- SBS funE, a South Korean cable/satellite television channel previously known as SBS E!

== Other ==
- "E!" the existence predicate as used in free logic
- Eureka (organisation) is an intergovernmental organisation for research and development funding and coordination

== See also ==
- E (disambiguation)
