= Central Aroostook, Maine =

- Unorganized territory
- Location of Central Aroostook, Maine
- Coordinates: 46°22′52″N 68°11′16″W
- Country: United States
- State: Maine
- County: Aroostook

Area
  - Total: 567.1 sq mi (1,468.7 km^{2})
  - Land: 556.6 sq mi (1,441.7 km^{2})
  - Water: 10.4 sq mi (27.0 km^{2})
- Elevation: 945 ft (288 m)

Population (2020)
  - Total: 164
  - Density: 0.26/sq mi (0.1/km^{2})
- Time zone: UTC-5 (Eastern (EST))
  - Summer (DST): UTC-4 (EDT)
- Area code: 207
- FIPS code: 23-11785
- GNIS feature ID: 582400

Central Aroostook is an unorganized territory in Aroostook County, Maine, United States. The population was 164 at the 2020 census.

== Geography ==
According to the United States Census Bureau, the unorganized territory has a total area of 567.1 square miles (1,468.7 km^{2}), of which 556.6 square miles (1,441.7 km^{2}) is land and 10.4 square miles (27.0 km^{2}), or 1.84%, is water.

There are 15 townships in the unorganized territory, including Webbertown, St. Croix, Scopan, Swett Farm, Dudley, and E Township. Cox Patent, an area within the township of TDR2 WELS, is also in Central Aroostook.

== Demographics ==
Historical population
Census	Pop.	Note	%±
1970	82		—
1980	16		−80.5%
1990	53		231.3%
2000	95		79.2%
2010	118		24.2%
2020	164		39.0%
U.S. Decennial Census

As of the 2000 census, there were 95 people, 44 households, and 27 families living in the unorganized territory. The population density was 0.2 inhabitants per square mile (0.077/km^{2}). There were 347 housing units, at an average density of 0.6 per square mile (0.23/km^{2}). The racial makeup of the unorganized territory was 98.95% White and 1.05% from two or more races.

There were 44 households, of which 11.4% had children under the age of 18 living with them, 63.6% were married couples living together, and 36.4% were non-families. 31.8% of all households were made up of individuals, and 20.5% had someone living alone who was 65 years of age or older. The average household size was 2.16, and the average family size was 2.61.

In the unorganized territory 11.6% of the population were under the age of 18, 4.2% were 18 to 24, 17.9% were 25 to 44, 43.2% were 45 to 64, and 23.2% were 65 or older. The median age was 49 years. For every 100 females, there were 120.9 males. For every 100 females age 18 and over, there were 115.4 males.

The median income for a household in the unorganized territory was $20,313, and the median income for a family was $22,188. Males had a median income of $21,875, versus $19,375 for females. The per capita income for the unorganized territory was $14,680. There were 30.3% of families and 38.6% of the population living below the poverty line, including 75.0% of those under 18 and 10.5% of those over 64.
