= E series =

E series may refer to:

== Transportation ==
- BMC E-series engine, a series of automobile engines
- Entwicklung series, a late World War II German standardised tank series
- Ford E-Series (Econoline/Club Wagon), a series of vans
- Honda E engine, a series of automobile engines
- Honda E series, a collection of humanoid robots
- Embraer E-Jet family, of jet airliners
- EMD E-unit, a line of streamliner diesel locomotives

== Technology ==
- E series of preferred numbers, a series of preferred values for electronic components
- E series, a line of server-class Intel Xeon CPUs
- E-Series, a line of Panavision lenses for shooting in anamorphic format
- HP E series, a series of digital cameras
- Nokia Eseries, Nokia business-oriented smartphones

== Other uses ==
- QI (E series), a series of the TV quiz show QI
- E-Series, of robots in the List of recurring characters from Sonic the Hedgehog video games

== See also ==
- Formula E (disambiguation)
- E number (disambiguation)
- E (disambiguation)
