= The Formula =

The Formula may refer to:

- The Formula (1980 film), a mystery film
- The Formula (2002 film), a fan film
- "The Formula" (song), a 1989 single by The D.O.C. from the album No One Can Do It Better
- The Formula (album), a 2008 collaborative album by Buckshot and 9th Wonder
- La Fórmula (album) (English: The Formula), a 2012 compilation album by various artists

== See also ==
- Formula (disambiguation)
