= Biggy (disambiguation) =

Biggy is most commonly a misspelling of “Biggie”, a nickname for American rapper The Notorious B.I.G.

Biggy may also refer to:

- William J. Biggy, former San Francisco chief of police
- Biggy Smallz, American rapper
- "Biggy", a character from Gold for the Tough Guys of the Prairie
- "'Biggy' Brix", a comics character, see Lieutenant Marvels
- "Biggy", a character from They Came to Rob Hong Kong
- "Jonathan Ignasius Salvatore 'Biggy' Jones", a character from Tough Guys of the Prairie

== See also ==
- Big (disambiguation)
- Biggie (disambiguation)
