= Group E =

Group E may refer to:

- E-Group: E-Groups are unique architectural complexes found among a number of ancient Maya settlements
- Group E (vase painting), a group of Attic vase painters of the black-figure style, active between 560 and 540 BC.
- One of six or eight groups of four teams competing at the FIFA World Cup
- EGroups Email list(s) that are based on various specific subjects/themes that had more features, than an email only list, including online storage of files for each groups emailing list. Which was bought by Yahoo and renamed to "Yahoo Groups" in 2000
- A group of four teams competing at the FIFA World Cup
  - 2022 FIFA World Cup Group E
  - 2018 FIFA World Cup Group E
  - 2014 FIFA World Cup Group E
  - 2010 FIFA World Cup Group E
  - 2006 FIFA World Cup Group E
  - 2002 FIFA World Cup Group E
  - 1998 FIFA World Cup Group E
  - 1994 FIFA World Cup Group E
  - 1990 FIFA World Cup Group E
- Group E Series Production Touring Cars, an Australian motor racing category current from 1964 to 1972
- Group E (FIA), an FIA regulated racing class

== See also ==
- Haplogroup E (disambiguation)
- Group (disambiguation)
- E (disambiguation)
