= Formula E (disambiguation) =

Formula E, officially the FIA Formula E World Championship, is an auto racing championship using fully electric single-seater cars.

Formula E may also refer to:

- Formula Enterprises, or Formula SCCA
- Formula E, a Formula Ford class with 1600 cc engines and outboard suspension
- Formula E, a 250 cc unlimited Superkart class
- Formula E, a Go-Kart track in Sunshine, Victoria which offers both petrol and electric go karts
- "Formula E" (The Apprentice), a 2024 television episode

== See also ==
- Formula (disambiguation)
- E (disambiguation)
