= E band =

E band may refer to:

- E (band), a Czech experimental rock band
- E band (NATO), a radio frequency band from 2 to 3 GHz
- E band (waveguide), a millimetre wave band from 60 to 90 GHz
