= Block E =

Block E may refer to:

- Block E (Minneapolis) a historic block of downtown Minneapolis
- Block E (rocket), a Soviet rocket propulsion module
- E-Blocks, US voting technology
- E-blocks, rapid prototyping electronics

== See also ==
- Block (disambiguation)
- E (disambiguation)
