= Open E =

Open E, Open-E or open e may refer to:

- Open E tuning for guitars
- in French and Italian, the letter e pronounced as the open-mid front unrounded vowel
- Latin epsilon, a letter of the extended Latin alphabet introduced by Gian Giorgio Trissino to represent the former

== See also ==
- Open (disambiguation)
- E (disambiguation)
