= Model E =

Model E or E-model or variant, may refer to:

== Aircraft ==
- Ace Model E Junior Ace, an interwar sport aircraft
- Burgess Model E, a pre-war aircraft
- Curtiss Model E, a 1911 aircraft
- Fike Model E, a 1970s light aircraft
- Wright Model E, a 1913 aircraft

== Automotive and road transport ==
- AJS Model E, an interwar motorcycle produced after the AJS Model D
- BSA Model E, an interwar motorcycle
- Ford Model E, a research and development division of Ford Motor Company, focusing on electrified vehicles

=== Automobiles ===
- Cadillac Model E, a 1905 runabout automobile
- Doble Model E, an interwar steam automobile variation of the Doble steam car
- Tesla Model E, the intended name for the electric vehicle that was renamed the Tesla Model 3
- Honda e, an electric car by Honda

== Other uses ==
- Comptometer Model E, a version of the Comptometer mechanical calculator
- Vickers Model E machine gun, a WWI aircraft machine gun

== See also ==
- Class E (disambiguation)
- E-Type (disambiguation)
- E (disambiguation)
- 5 (disambiguation)
- ME (disambiguation)
- Model (disambiguation)
