= Formula (disambiguation) =

A formula, in mathematics, is an entity constructed using the symbols and formation rules of a given logical language.

Formula may also refer to:

- a concept in the theory of oral-formulaic composition, related to oral poetry
- a type of ritual in Roman law
- a bill of materials
- a chemical formula, an expression of the contents of a chemical compound
- Formula language, a Lotus Notes programming language
- infant formula, a food for infants
- a magical formula
- Trinitarian formula, a Biblical phrase
- Well-formed formula, a word that is part of a formal language, in logic

== Arts, entertainment, media ==
- Formula fiction, literature following a predictable form
- A defunct video game label of Lost Boys Games, a defunct Dutch game developer

=== Music ===
- Dave Formula (born 1946), British musician
- "[Formula]" (ΔM_{i}^{−1} = −αΣ_{n=1}^{N}D_{i}[n] [Σ_{j∈C[i]}F_{ji}[n − 1] + Fext_{i}[n^{−1}]]), the first B-side of "Windowlicker" by Aphex Twin, also known as "[Equation]"
- Formula (album), a 1995 album by OLD
- Formulæ (album), a 2016 album by Master's Hammer

== Vehicular ==
- Formula (boats), a brand of pleasure boats
- Formula racing, a type of motorsport

== See also ==
- Formulation
- The Formula (disambiguation)
