= E number (disambiguation) =

An E number is a food additive code.

E number or E code may also refer to:

- e (mathematical constant), the base of the natural logarithm
- 14 (number), the number represented by hexadecimal "E"
- International E-road network, a numbering system for roads in Europe
- External Cause of Injury Codes, codes used to define the mechanism of death or injury; see List of ICD-9 codes E
- E-numbers in physics, the elements of a Clifford algebra in Arthur S. Eddington's "fundamental theory"

== See also ==
- E notation, the base-10 exponential notation
- E series (disambiguation)
