= E (1970s text editor) =

E is a text editor originally developed at the Stanford AI Lab in the 1970s for the WAITS operating system.

E was one of the first WYSIWYG editors. Richard Stallman visited the Stanford Artificial Intelligence Lab in 1976 and was impressed by this technology. Carl Mikkelsen had previously implemented a similar hack to the TECO text editor, adding a combined display+editing mode called "Control-R".
