= Biggie (convenience store) =

Paraguayan convenience store chain

Biggie S.A.
- Type: Private
- Industry: Retail
- Founded: 2013; 13 years ago
- Headquarters: Paraguay
- Number of locations: 263 stores (2025)
- Key people: Joaquín González (CEO), Giuliano Caligaris
- Products: Convenience Stores
- Owner: Grupo Zuccolillo (owns 50%) (2025)
- Number of employees: 5,300 (2025)
- Website: www.biggie.com.py

Biggie, or Biggie Express, or Biggie Farma (for its pharmaceutical stores) is a Paraguayan convenience store chain founded in 2013. In August 2025, the chain had 263 stores and was present in 31 cities in Paraguay. Monthly, approximatelly 4 million people shop at Biggie stores. It is Paraguay's first and largest 24-hour convenience store chain.

== Ownership and structure ==
In January 2025, Grupo Azeta of the Zuccolillo family announced to buy 50% of the shares of the Biggie chain. The Azeta Zuccolillo group also owns other major companies in Paraguay such as the bank Banco Atlas, ABC media holding company, telecommunications company Personal, real estate company Inmobiliaria del Este, shopping malls, and several other large companies. By this purchase, the group became a major competitor in the market sector of the Vierci Group (owner of supermarket Superseis).

== History ==
The idea for the creation of the Biggie chain started during a barbecue of a group of former classmates, which included the founders Joaquín González and Giuliano Caligaris, based on a lack of possibility of doing nighttime shopping in Paraguay. Ever since its creation, its business model has been to be open be open 24 hours a day, 7 days per week and 365 days per year.

In 2018, the Biggie supermarket chain had 37 stores, namely in Asunción and its Metropolitan Area. In 2019, they opened a further 33 stores. Beyond these 70 stores, there were 2 stores in San Bernardino. In 2019, Biggie announced they were working on opening 40 to 45 more stores in Asunción and the surrounding areas, and also planned to open the first branches in Ciudad del Este. In the last quarter of 2024, Biggie opened its first 7 pharmaceutical convenience stores, called Biggie Farma. As of September 2025, Biggie had 270 stores in Paraguay.

== Nationwide temporary closure (August 2025) ==
Mid-August 2025, the Paraguayan government ordered to close all 263 Biggies stores in Paraguay temporarily, citing health concerns. It was reported that the government order came due to the discovery of expired and relabeled products in at least 12 branches, according to the Consumer Protection Secretariat (Spanish: Secretaría de Defensa del Consumidor—Sedeco). The measure was adopted jointly with the National Directorate of Health Surveillance (Dirección Nacional de Vigilancia Sanitaria—Dinavisa).

Sara Irún, head of Sedeco, was the official who announced the government's measure against the Biggie supermarket chain. She later claimed that her statement had been misinterpreted, explaining that the chain's executives themselves decided to close all their stores, and that neither Dinavisa nor Sedeco's resolutions required a full shutdown.

The nationwide closure started 12 August 2025. On 14 August 2025, some sources reported that 43 stores were allowed to re-open, whereas other sources reported 113 stores were allowed to re-open that day. By the end of the afternoon of the 14 August, the director of Dinavisa, in a press conference, announced that he was working on signing 77 resolutions to open the same number of Biggie branches.

The news agency MercoPress reported that some believed the shut-down was politically motivated, a retaliation by President Santiago Peña, as ABC Color (part of Biggie's parent company group Azeta Zuccolillo) had previously exposed President Peña's flamboyant lifestyle while public healthcare lacked resources. According to MercoPress, President Peña had previously publicly expressed opposition to the media outlet of the Azeta Zuccolillo group and issued direct threats against them.

Natalia Zuccolillo, the principal shareholder of Biggie, denounced the shutdown and accused the government of "abuse of authority".

The Paraguayan Chamber of Supermarkets (Cámara Paraguaya de Supermercados—Capasu) called the sanction disproportionate and unprecedented, and claimed it damaged Paraguay's business climate. The CEO of Biggie, Joaquín González, was elected president of the Paraguayan Chamber of Supermarkets in mid 2023, and remained so in 2024 and to date (2025). ABC Color equally called the measure disproportionate and damaging to the free business climate of Paraguay.

Following backlash from civil society and politicians, president Santiago Peña claimed that its government was not executing a witch hunt on Biggie, but instead tried to protect the consumer. The president claimed that the Biggie closure case received a lot of media attention due to the influence of its business group, as it owns a media outlet.

== Explosion of generator ==
In February 2021, a person died from poisoning due to the toxic smoke released after an explosion of an electric generator in a Biggie chain store in San Lorenzo. A further 5 people were injured.
