= Audi Type E =

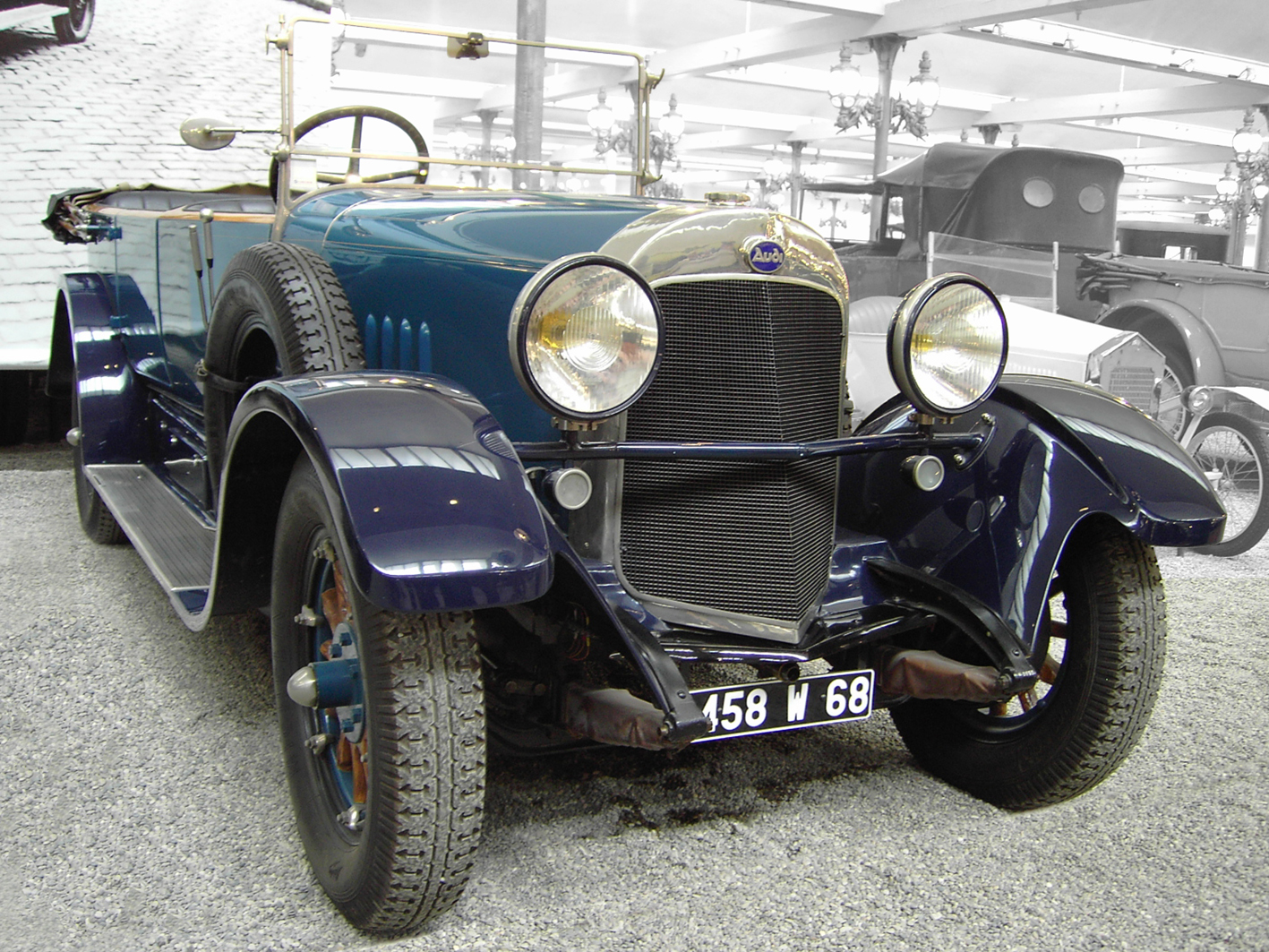

Overview
- Manufacturer: Audi Automobilwerke GmbH Zwickau (from 1915 Audi Werke Zwickau)
- Production: 1911–1924
- Assembly: Zwickau, Germany

Powertrain
- Engine: 5,699 cc straight-4
- Transmission: 4-speed manual

Dimensions
- Wheelbase: 3,320 mm (131 in) or 3,465 mm (136.4 in)

The Audi Type E was a passenger car introduced by Audi in 1913. It was the largest pre-war car from Audi.

The vehicle had a four-cylinder two-block in-line engine with 5,699 cc of displacement. It developed over a four-speed countershaft gearbox and a propeller shaft, which drove the rear wheels. The claimed maximum output was 55 PS (40 kW; 54 hp) at 1650 or 1750 rpm, supporting a top speed of 90 km/h (56 mph). The foot brake operated via a mechanical linkage on the drive shaft.

The car had a ladder frame and two leaf-sprung solid axles. It was available with various closed, semi-closed and open topped "Touring car" bodies, including a Laundaulet (with a large enclosed passenger compartment at the back and a semi-open front bench for the chauffeur and a front passenger) by the coach-builder Deissner of Köthen.

350 Type Es were produced.

== Specification ==
Production	1912–1923
Engine	4 Cylinder, 4 Stroke
Bore x Stroke	110 mm x 150 mm (5.9 in)
Capacity	5720 cc
Power	55 PS (40 kW; 54 hp)
Top Speed	75 km/h (47 mph)
Empty Weight	1,225 kg (2,701 lb) (Chassis)
Wheelbase	3,320 mm (130.7 in)
Track Front/Rear	1,400 mm (55.1 in)/1,400 mm (55.1 in)

== Sources ==
- Schrader, Halwart: Deutsche Autos 1885-1920, Motorbuch Verlag Stuttgart, 1. Auflage (2002), ISBN 3-613-02211-7
- Oswald, Werner (2001). Deutsche Autos 1920-1945, Band (vol) 2 (in German). Motorbuch Verlag. ISBN 3-613-02170-6.
