= E+ =

E+ or e^{+} may refer to:

- A positron, which has the symbol e^{+}
- An E augmented triad, a chord in music
- E notation, for large numbers in spreadsheets and some other computer programs

== See also ==
- E-Plus (stylized as e-plus^{+}), former German mobile operator
- ePlus, American consultative technology company
