= Eric Neustadter =

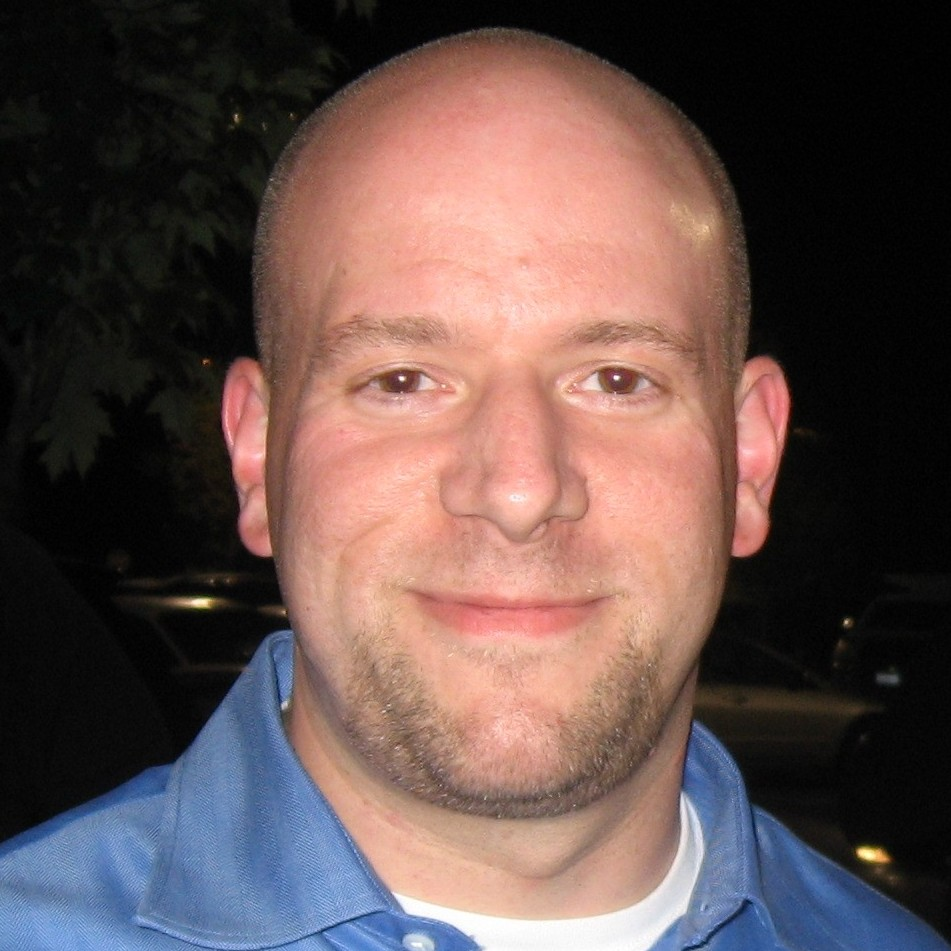
- Other name: 'ee'
- Known for: Co-host of "Major Nelson Radio" podcast
- Website: https://live.xbox.com/Profile?Gamertag=E

Eric Alan Neustadter, also known by his Xbox Live Gamertag e, is the former Operations Manager for the Microsoft gaming network Xbox Live. Neustadter is frequently a co-host of Larry Hryb's "Major Nelson Radio" Xbox-related podcast. Neustadter has been with Xbox Live since 2002. He attended the University of Oregon.

According to Microsoft, "e" is the first Gamertag ever created on Xbox Live, having been created on August 13, 2002. Neustadter picked the Gamertag in the early stages of Xbox Live as an abbreviation for his first name.

On October 23, 2015, Neustadter announced via Twitter that after 14.5 years, he was leaving Xbox. In August 2016, he announced via Twitter that he'd joined The Pokémon Company International as VP of Technology.

== Other media ==
Identifying himself only by his Xbox Live gamertag "e", Neustadter briefly appeared in the video at the end of the Xbox 360 viral marketing campaign OurColony. In his role as Director of Xbox Operations for Xbox Live, Neustadter appeared in a video which was included with all consoles of the Xbox 360 when it was originally released. Neustadter is also credited as contributing to Halo 3 in the role of "Platform & Xbox Live: Microsoft Xbox".

He has also appeared on the Rooster Teeth Podcast and a Rooster Teeth/Achievement Hunter series called "Game Time with Burnie Burns".

== "Swatting" Hoax ==
On August 29, 2011, the King County Sheriff Department responded to a 911 call in response to a text message received by AT&T's emergency cell phone service. The text message, apparently from Neustadter, indicated that several armed "Russian" gunmen were invading his home.

The text messages included

- “2 armed Russian males broke in and they shot my son”
- “They have claymores outside... my door is barricaded...pls hurry!”
- “They are coming upstairs...pls hurry.”
- “Kicked the door in.”
- “Now they are trying to break into my room.”

Police initially responded with a SWAT team, only to discover the threat was a hoax. No one was injured in the incident. As a result, the King County Sheriff Department sent a memo to other agencies alerting them to the hoax.

Disgruntled members of Xbox Live apparently are pranking Microsoft Employees who are tasked with enforcing rules on that on-line service. The Deputy report read, in part, “He (Neustadter) informed me that he is XXX for Xbox Live Operations and one of his primary duties is to head up teams whose job it is to find and shut down hackers who hack the system to locate cheats for Xbox and try and sell them. The hackers become extremely upset when this occurs and have been known to retaliate for it."
