= Tasmanian Government Railways E class =

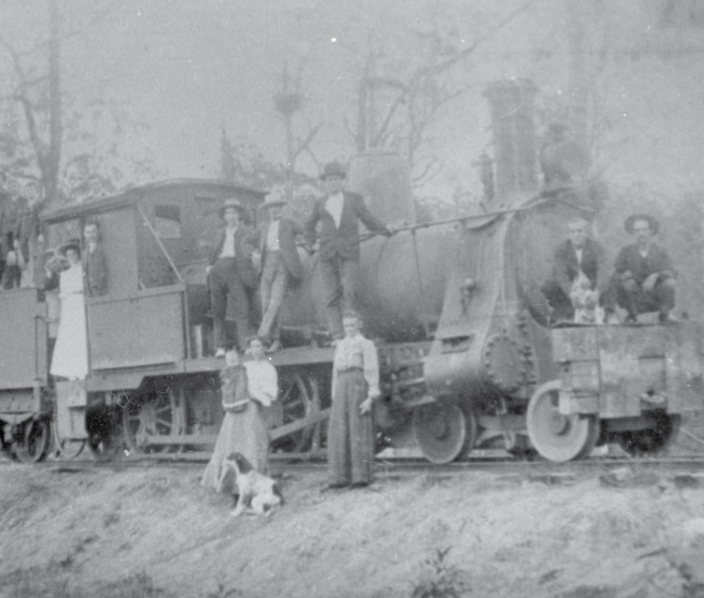
Type and origin
- Power type: Steam
- Builder: Hunslet Engine Company
- Build date: 1874
- Total produced: 7
Specifications
- Configuration
  - Whyte: 4-6-0T
- Gauge: 1,067 mm (3 ft 6 in)
- Driver dia.: 3 ft 6 in (1,067 mm)
- Total weight: 33 long tons 0 cwt (73,900 lb or 33.5 t)
- Fuel type: Coal
- Boiler pressure: 140 lbf/in^{2} (0.97 MPa)-145 lbf/in^{2} (1.00 MPa)
- Cylinder size: 14 in × 18 in (356 mm × 457 mm)
Performance figures
- Tractive effort: 9,408 lbf (41.85 kN)
Career
- Operators: Tasmanian Government Railways
- Numbers: 1-7
- Disposition: All scrapped

The Tasmanian Government Railways E class was a class of 4-6-0T steam locomotives operated by the Tasmanian Main Line Company and later the Tasmanian Government Railways.

== History ==
In 1874, the Tasmanian Main Line Company took delivery of seven 4-6-0 tank locomotives from the Hunslet Engine Company, Leeds. Problems soon arose with their weight and the side tanks were removed with their water supply carried in a tank in an open wagon that was towed. In 1887, one was sold to the contractor building the Devonport to Ulverstone line and in 1889, another to the builder of the Zeehan to Strahan line.

The remaining five were included in the sale of the Tasmanian Main Line Company to the Tasmanian Government Railways on 1 October 1890 and classified as the E class. Most were converted to 4-4-0 configuration by removing the leading driving axle. The locomotive sold to the Zeehan line contractor was purchased in 1897. From 1907, some were transferred to the Public Works Department. All had been scrapped by 1929.
