= E Township, Maine =

Unincorporated township in Maine, United States

Coordinates: 46°29′30″N 68°0′30″W

E is an unincorporated township located in Aroostook County, Maine, United States. It is part of the Central Aroostook Unorganized Territory and borders the towns of Blaine to the east and Westfield to the north. As of the 1990 census, when it was still organized as a plantation, E Plantation had 64 residents. However, in 1990 its residents decided to disorganize the community and give up control to the state in an effort to reduce taxes. K–12 education for the community is provided by Maine School Administrative District 42, which also serves neighboring Blaine and Mars Hill. However, because E Plantation withdrew from the school district following its disorganization, its students are paid tuition.
