= E (band) =

Czech experimental rock band

- Origin: Brno, Czechoslovakia
- Genres: Experimental rock
- Years active: 1984–1997
- Past members: Vladimír Kokolia; Josef Ostřanský; Vladimír Václavek

E was a Czech experimental rock group from Brno active between 1984 and 1997. Their music fell into the wider scope of alternative, underground, and post-punk rock genres.

== Background ==
Josef Ostřanský and Vladimír Václavek were known from the band Dunaj and from their collaboration with singer Iva Bittová. The band's frontman was singer and lyricist Vladimír Kokolia, known primarily as a painter, graphic artist, and cartoonist; he went on to work as the head teacher of graphic studio 2 at the Academy of Fine Arts in Prague.

The band's music was based upon mutually interlocking riffs of both instrumentalists, forming elaborate loops together with simple but sophisticated cross-rhythms. Kokolia's role consisted of very expressive declamations of imaginative and metaphorical existentialist lyrics, often with sarcastic humour.

Onstage, both guitarists were also equipped with a simple drum kit (snare, kick drum, tom, and hi-hat) and played those instruments simultaneously while Kokolia sometimes operated the foot electronic percussion rug. Two recorded albums represent only a part of the band's repertoire.

== Former members ==
- Vladimír Kokolia – vocals, percussion
- Josef Ostřanský – guitar, percussion
- Vladimír Václavek – bass guitar, guitar, percussion

== Discography ==
- E (Live, 1990)
- I Adore Nothing (I Believe It Does Not Exist) (1994)
