= E class Melbourne tram (1914) =

E-class
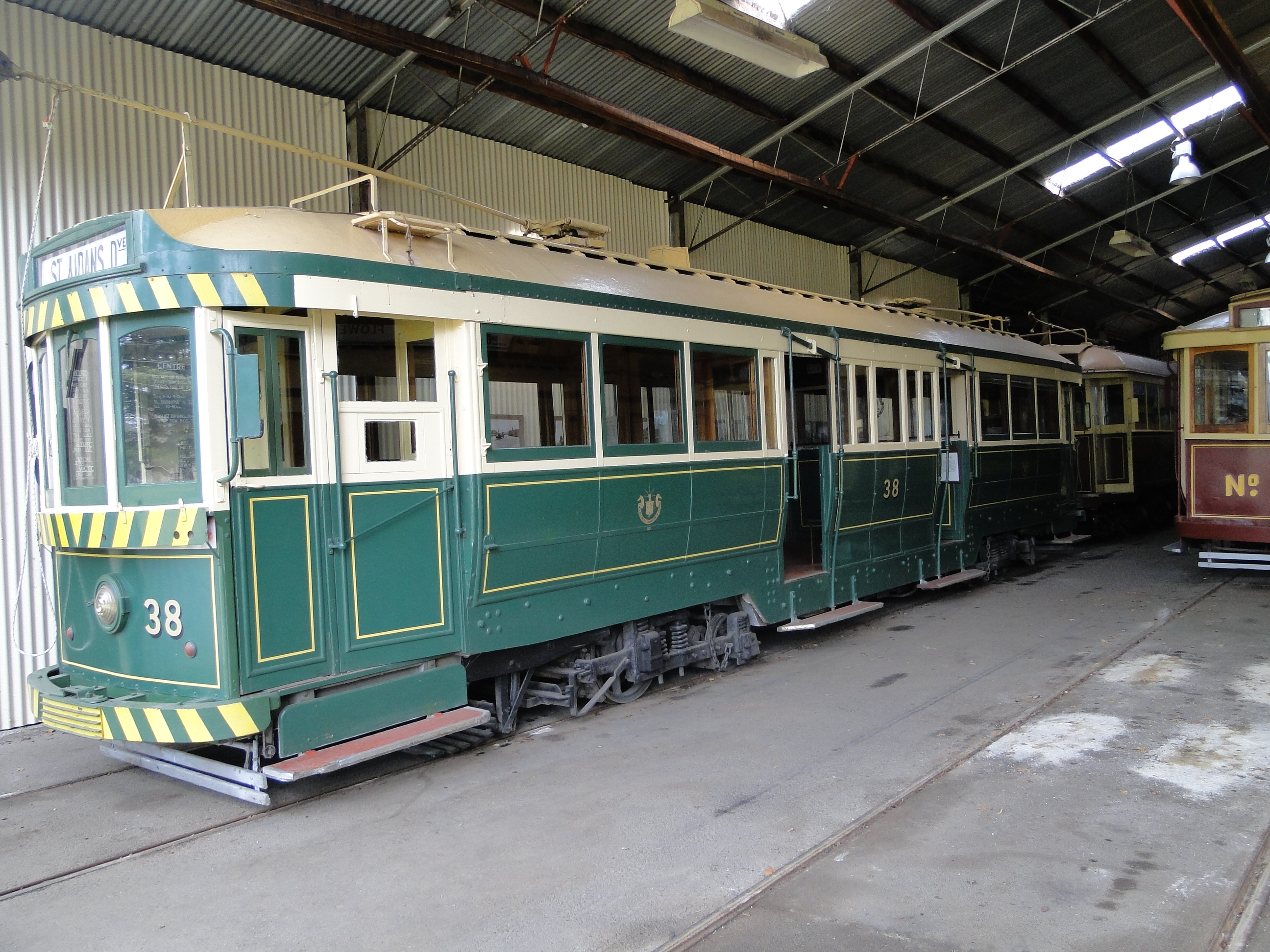
- Manufacturer: Duncan & Fraser
- Assembly: Adelaide
- Constructed: 1914
- Number built: 9
- Fleet numbers: 37-45
- Capacity: 56 as built, 48 as converted

Specifications
- Car length: 13.50 metres (44 ft 3 in)
- Width: 2.62 metres (8 ft 7 in)
- Height: 3.1 metres (10 ft 2 in)
- Wheel diameter: 838 millimetres (33.0 in) (driving); 508 millimetres (20.0 in) (pony)
- Weight: 17.5 tonnes as built, 15.7 tonnes as converted
- Traction motors: 2 x 50 hp (37 kW) GE 202 as built, later 2 x 65 hp (48 kW) GE 201G
- Current collection: Trolley pole
- Bogies: Brush 22E
- Track gauge: 1,435 mm (4 ft 8 1/2 in)

The E-class was a group of 10 trams built by Duncan & Fraser, Adelaide, for the Prahran & Malvern Tramways Trust (P&MTT) in 1914, numbered 36 to 45. Number 36 was converted to a different form by the P&MTT c. 1916, and was later designated D-class. All retained their fleet numbers when passed to the Melbourne & Metropolitan Tramways Board (M&MTB) after it took over the P&MTT on 2 February 1920, and they were designated E-class sometime after October 1921. By late 1923, together with other all M&MTB drop-end-and-centre Maximum Traction trams, they were re-classed as C-class trams. The 22E Maximum Traction trucks were of JG Brill design, although manufactured by Brush in England.

In 1917 and 1919, all trams had their 2 x 50 hp (37 kW) GE 202 motors replaced by 2 x 65 hp (48 kW) GE 201G, and in late 1920 all had their original track and electrical brakes replaced by air brakes. Standard M&MTB destination boxes were built-in to the roof ends to replace their original "Malvern" boxes from 1925, and all had their centre sections modified to resemble a W2-class tram from 1928 to 1929, being painted green at the same time. In the first half of 1935 all were fitted with route number boxes.

Some cars were placed in storage in the late 1930s and early 1940s, and number 43 was scrapped in mid-1942 although its body was not sold until late 1944. All others, with the possible exception of number 40, were overhauled and had their rear doors blanked-off for service during World War II. A few of these trams remained in occasional service until 1951.

In the second quarter of 1951, all remaining eight cars were sold to the SEC for use in Ballarat, Bendigo, and Geelong. Trams 41 and 42 went to Ballarat as their numbers 38 and 39; 44 and 45 went to Bendigo as their (2nd) numbers 17 and 18; and cars 37, 38, 39, and 40 went to Geelong as their numbers 38, 37, 39, and 40 respectively. In 1953, number 39 at Geelong and number 41 at Ballarat (as No.38) were converted for one-man operation, however they were never used as such. After the closure of the Geelong tramways in 1956, number 37 (Geelong No.38) was scrapped while 38 to 40 were sent to Ballarat for further service as their numbers 42, 41, and 43 respectively.

== Preservation ==
Five have been preserved:

- 40 by the Tramway Museum Society of Victoria
- 41 by the Ballarat Tramway Museum as Ballarat number 39
- 42 by the Ballarat Tramway Museum as Ballarat number 38
- 44 by the Bendigo Trust Tramways
- 45 by the Bendigo Trust Tramways
