= Biggy Smallz =

American rapper (born 1978 or 1979)

- Born: Tim Bigelow; 1978 or 1979 (age 47–48)
- Origin: California, U.S.
- Died: 1994 (Unconfirmed)
- Genres: Rap
- Years active: 1991–1994
- Label: Life Records

Tim Bigelow (born 1978 or 1979), known professionally as Biggy Smallz, is an American rapper. He is mainly known for having provoked the name change of rapper The Notorious B.I.G. from his previous stage name "Biggie Smalls".

== Biography ==
Tim Bigelow was born in 1978 or 1979 and hails from California. He started recording music in 1991, at 12 years old, with his stage name deriving from the character Biggie Smalls from the film Let's Do It Again (1975). His song "When Duty Calls", about the Gulf War, was mentioned in a 1991 Boston Globe article as among "Persian Gulf curiosities". By February 1993, Bigelow had released his first single "My Weekend" and was being managed by David Esterson of Andi-Bird Management. Esterson also put out a statement requesting that Bigelow, a "14-year-old white rapper", not be confused with rapper Christopher Wallace (then known as Biggie Smalls). Eventually, Wallace announced his professional name change to "The Notorious B.I.G." during an interview, in response to what he said was a threat of a lawsuit by Bigelow. By May 1994, Bigelow was working under the Bellmark imprint Life Records. In July of 1994, Bigelow released his most successful single "Nobody Rides For Free" which also became his only charting song. He is reported to have died later in 1994 after a drive-by outside a liquor store, but this has not been confirmed by those close to him, and he reportedly kept making music under the name "Shadowcast". On 2pac's posthumous song "God Bless The Dead", he shouts out someone by the name of Biggie Smalls who is dead, however it has been theorized that this may be referring to a member of Live Squad.

== Reception ==
Max Weinstein of The Boombox criticized Bigelow's 1991 song "Save Mr. Perkins" and likened it to "a jock jam with a white child actor for a rapper". As for the 1994 song "Nobody Rides For Free", Weinstein commented that Bigelow's "raps are somewhat bland, spouting braggadocio with a certain air in his voice like he's trying out for Bone Thugs."

=== Billboard chart listings ===
Song	Chart	Ranking	For week ending	Ref.
"Nobody Rides For Free"	Bubbling Under Hot R&B Singles	3	July 2, 1994	
"Nobody Rides For Free"	Hot Rap Singles	39	July 2, 1994	
