= E (surname) =

E (鄂)
- Pronunciation: È (Mandarin)
- Language: Chinese

Origin
- Language: Old Chinese

E (Chinese: 鄂; pinyin: È) is a Chinese surname. It is listed 272nd in the Song dynasty classical text Hundred Family Surnames.

The origin of the surname is vague. There is disagreement in Chinese name dictionaries if the surname originated in Wuchang, or in Shanxi.

Its earliest appearance dates back to Shang dynasty, where under the reign of King Zhou, a governmental official with the surname, E, was embroiled in a conflict with the King.

== Notable people ==
- E Dongchen (1939–2019), scientist and polar explorer
- E Jingping (born 1956), engineer and politician, Minister of Water Resources
- E Yitai; born 1956), engineer, former President of Minzu University of China
- E Weinan (born 1963), mathematician
- E Jie (born 1967), Olympic fencer
- E Jingwen (born 1989), actress
- E Meidie (born 1986), kickboxer
