= 2O =

2O or 2-O may refer to:

- 2o Sector, see Secondary sector of the economy
- 2'-O-methylation
- 2O, IATA code for Island Air Service in Alaska; see Essential Air Service

== See also ==
- 2OOO, a Sydney, Australia radio station
- O2 (disambiguation)
- H2O (Molecule)
- J20 (disambiguation)
- L20 (disambiguation)
- N2O (disambiguation)
- 20
- 2O (Atom)
- 2Q (disambiguation)
