= O2 =

O2, O-2, o2, or similar orthography may refer to:

== Science and technology ==
- Dioxygen (O_{2}), the common allotrope of oxygen
- Oxide (O^{2−}), an ion
- Superoxide (O^{−}_{2}), an ion
- Dioxygenyl (O^{+}_{2}), an ion
- Doubly ionized oxygen (O^{2+}), an ion
- O(2), the 2-dimensional orthogonal group in group theory
- O2, an EEG electrode site according to the 10–20 system
- SGI O2, a Unix workstation computer
- O2, a class of O-type star
- Orbital O2, a tidal power turbine in Orkney, Scotland
- -O2, a compiler optimization tag

== Places ==
- The O2, an entertainment district in London, England
  - The O2 Arena, the arena within The O2
- O2 Arena (Prague) or Sazka Arena, an arena in Prague, Czech Republic
- O2 Centre, an indoor shopping and entertainment centre on Finchley Road, London, England
- O2 Residence, a part of the Jumeirah Lake Towers in Dubai, United Arab Emirates
- O2 World (Berlin), former branding for Uber Arena, an indoor arena in Berlin, Germany
- O2 World (Hamburg), former branding for Barclays Arena, an indoor arena in Hamburg, Germany
- Otoyol 2, a motorway in Turkey called "O2"
- The O2 (Dublin), the former name of 3Arena
- Ring 2 (Aarhus), a road in Aarhus, Denmark, which appears as "O2" on signs
- Ring 2 (Copenhagen), a road in Copenhagen, Denmark, which appears as "O2" on signs
- The O2 Belfast, an entertainment, education, and leisure destination in Belfast, Northern Ireland

== Arts, entertainment and media ==
=== Film ===
- Oxygen (2021 film) or O2, an American-French survival thriller film in production
- O2 (2020 film), an Estonian-Latvia-Lithuanian-Finnish historical spy thriller film
- O2 (2022 film), an Indian Tamil language survival thriller film
- O2 (2024 film), an Indian Kannada language medical thriller film

=== Music ===
==== Albums ====
- O_{2} (FireHouse album) (2000) album of the rock band FireHouse
- O2 (O-Town album) (2002) album by American boy band O-Town
- O_{2} (Tonéx album) (2002) album by Gospel singer Tonéx
- O2: Avalon Remixed, a 2002 album by Avalon
- O2 (Son of Dave album), 2006 album by Son of Dave

==== Songs ====
- "O2", a song by Orange Range from Panic Fancy
- "O2", a 2002 song by Sleater-Kinney from One Beat
- "O2", a song by Suho from Self-Portrait

=== Other arts, entertainment and media ===
- Ö2, a radio service for Austria and South Tyrol
- O2, a character in Kirby 64: The Crystal Shards
- UOC O2, institutional repository of the Open University of Catalonia

== Businesses and organisations ==
- O2 (brand), a global brand name owned by the Spanish telecommunications company Telefónica
  - O2 Store, a chain of retail stores owned and operated by Telefónica Europe, with regional subsidiaries:
  - O2 (Ireland), merged into Three Ireland
  - O2 (UK), a joint venture with Liberty Global
  - O2 Czech Republic
  - Telefónica Germany
  - O2 Slovakia
- O2 Academy, a chain of music venues
- O2 Wireless USA or H2O Wireless, a prepaid wireless service by Locus Telecommunications
- O2TV, a Russian independent TV channel

== Vehicles and military ==
- Cessna O-2 Skymaster, a military twin-engine light aircraft
- Douglas O-2, a military single-engine observation biplane
- GNR Class O2, a class of British steam locomotives classified O2 by both the GNR and the LNER
- LSWR O2 class, a class of British steam locomotives
- O 2-class submarine, a class of submarines of the Royal Netherlands Navy
- Oldershaw O-2, a glider
- SP&S Class O-2, a 1910 steam locomotives class
- Taff Vale Railway O2 class, a class of British steam locomotives
- USS O-2 (SS-63), a 1918 United States O class submarine

=== Pay grade ===
- O-2, a uniformed services pay grade of the United States:
  - First lieutenant (United States) in the Army, Marine Corps, Air Force, and Space Force
  - Lieutenant (junior grade) in the Navy, Coast Guard, Public Health Service Commissioned Corps, and NOAA Commissioned Officer Corps

== See also ==
- 02 (disambiguation)
- Oz (disambiguation)
- 2O (disambiguation)
- 2Q (disambiguation)
- Q2 (disambiguation)
