= 02 =

02 may refer to:

- The year 2002, or any year ending with 02
- The month of February
- 2 (number)
- 02 (Urban Zakapa album), 2012
- The number of the French department Aisne
- 0^{2}, the secret final boss of Kirby 64: The Crystal Shards (2000)
- Zero Two, a character from the anime and manga series Darling in the Franxx (2018–2020)
- Lynk & Co 02, a compact hatchback and crossover
- Digimon Adventure 02, pronounced as Zero Two

== See also ==
- O2 (disambiguation)
- Q2 (disambiguation)
- 2Q (disambiguation)
