= Oz =

Oz or OZ may refer to:

== Arts and entertainment ==
- Land of Oz, the setting for many of L. Frank Baum's novels

=== Fictional characters and entities ===
- Oz (Buffy the Vampire Slayer), a character from the TV series
- Oz (One Piece), a manga character
- OZ (Ultimate Marvel), a mutagen
- OZ, a virtual world, virtual reality in the movie Summer Wars
- Leonard "Oz" Osbourne, a Geordie bricklayer in British TV series Auf Wiedersehen, Pet, played by Jimmy Nail
- Chris Ostreicher, a character in the American Pie film series
- Nicholas "Oz" Oseransky, a character in the comedy film, The Whole Nine Yards and its sequel, The Whole Ten Yards.
- Organization of the Zodiac, or Oz, an organization in the anime series Mobile Suit Gundam Wing
- Oz Vessalius, a protagonist in the manga Pandora Hearts
- Oz, a playable character in Call of Duty: Advanced Warfare's Exo Zombies mode
- Wizard of Oz (character), often known simply as "Oz"

=== Comics ===
- Oz (comics), a comic book series based on The Wizard of Oz
- Oz (Judge Dredd story), a mini-series
- Oz, a Buffy the Vampire Slayer comic
- Oz, a manga by Natsumi Itsuki

=== Music ===
- Oz (band), a Finnish heavy metal band
- Carmen Maki & Oz, a Japanese rock band
- Oz (album), by Missy Higgins, 2014
- Oz (soundtrack), the soundtrack for the HBO television series
- FZ:OZ, an album by Frank Zappa
- "Oz", a song by Two Hours Traffic from their self-titled debut album

=== Publications ===
- Oz (magazine) (1963–1973), Australia/UK underground satire magazine
- The Oz, a nickname for the newspaper The Australian
- OZ (radio amateur magazine), a Danish radio amateur magazine published by Experimenterende Danske Radioamatører
- Liber OZ, the Rights of Man.
- Ozwords (1994–2019), newsletter from the Australian National Dictionary Centre, Canberra

=== Other arts and entertainment ===
- Oz (1976 film), an Australian rock music update of The Wizard of Oz
- Oz (TV series), an HBO-produced prison drama, aired 1997–2003
- Oz: Into the Wild, a 2002 novel featuring Buffy the Vampire Slayer character Oz
- OZ - Over Zenith, a 2005 game for the PlayStation 2
- The Dr. Oz Show, a daytime television series hosted by Mehmet Oz, aired 2009–2022
- Oz the Great and Powerful, a 2013 American fantasy adventure film directed by Sam Raimi

== Businesses and organizations ==
- OZ Group, an Italian wheel manufacturer
- OZ Minerals, an Australian mining company
- Circus Oz, an Australian circus group
- The Oz Film Manufacturing Company, an independent film studio from 1914 to 1915, co-founded by L. Frank Baum
- CHOZ-FM, a Canadian radio station based in St. John's, Newfoundland and Labrador, known as OZ FM
- Asiana Airlines (IATA code OZ since 1988)
- Ozark Air Lines (IATA code OZ until 1986)

== People ==
- Oz (surname), a list of people
- Oz (given name), a list of people with either the given name or nickname
- Oz (record producer), a Swiss record producer
- Oz Fox (born 1961), stage name of Richard Alfonso Martinez, lead guitarist of the Christian glam metal band Stryper
- Oz, ring name of Kevin Nash (born 1959), American semi-retired professional wrestler

== Places ==
- A nickname for Australia; see Name of Australia
- Oz, Isère, a town and commune in France
- Oz, Kentucky, an unincorporated community
- Oz Park, a public park in Chicago
- A nickname for Oswego, New York

=== Extraterrestrial ===
- Oz Terra, a highland region on Pluto's moon Charon

== Science and technology ==
- Ounce, abbreviated oz., referring to several units of measure
- Oz (programming language)
- .oz, a former MHSnet domain
- .oz, an OpenNIC hosted Top-level domain
- OZ Virtual, a 3D world viewer
- Oz: an EEG electrode site according to the 10-20 system

== Other uses ==
- Oz Brigade, an Israel Defense Forces commando brigade
- Congregation Ohab Zedek, a Manhattan synagogue sometimes abbreviated OZ

== See also ==
- Ornstein–Zernike equation, in statistical mechanics
- O2 (disambiguation)
- OS (disambiguation)
