= 20N =

20N may refer to:

- 20-N, Spanish abbreviation for November 20, the date of death of two prominent figures
- New York State Route 20N, decommissioned in 1962 which stretched from the town of Marcellus to the village of Cazenovia
- Nitrogen-20 (^{20}N), an isotope of nitrogen

== See also ==
- N20 (disambiguation)
- N2O (disambiguation)
