= I20 =

I20, I 20 or I-20 may refer to:

- Interstate 20, a highway in the southeastern United States
- I-20 (form), a United States government document that provides supporting information for the issuance of a student visa or change of status
- I-20 (rapper) (born 1975), American rapper
- I-20 (sailing scow), a sloop rigged scow with a spinnaker
- I2O, a defunct computer I/O specification
- Hyundai i20, a car
- Japanese submarine I-20, a Type C submarine
- Kalmar Regiment (1816–1892), a Swedish infantry regiment
- Västerbotten Regiment (1893–1973), a Swedish infantry regiment

== See also ==
- L20 (disambiguation)
