= Audi A2 =

Compact MPV-styled supermini car produced by Audi (1999-2005)

Audi A2 (8Z)
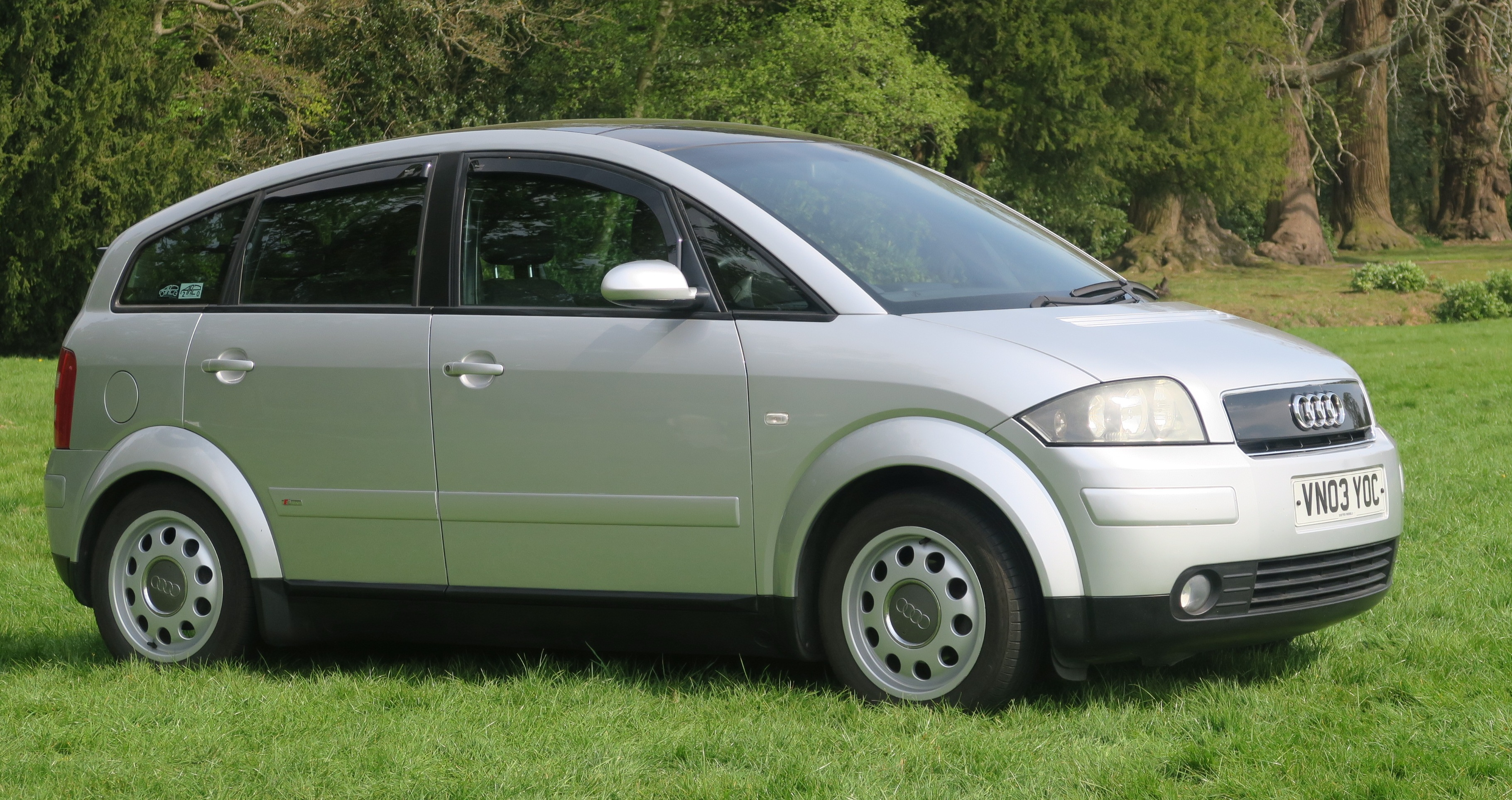

Overview
- Manufacturer: Audi
- Production: November 1999 – August 2005
- Model years: 2000–2005
- Assembly: Germany: Neckarsulm
- Designer: Luc Donckerwolke

Body and chassis
- Class: Supermini
- Body style: 5-door hatchback
- Layout: Transverse front-engine, front-wheel-drive
- Platform: Volkswagen Group A04 (PQ24)

Powertrain
- Engine: petrol: 1.4 L I4; 1.6 L FSI I4; diesel: 1.2 L TDI PD I3; 1.4 L TDI PD I3
- Transmission: 5-speed manual (Getrag); 5-speed automated manual

Dimensions
- Wheelbase: 2,405 mm (94.7 in)
- Length: 3,826 mm (150.6 in)
- Width: 1,673 mm (65.9 in)
- Height: 1,553 mm (61.1 in)
- Kerb weight: 895–1,030 kg (1,973–2,271 lb)

Chronology
- Successor: Audi A2 e-tron (spiritual)

The Audi A2 (internally designated Typ 8Z) is a compact MPV-styled supermini car produced by the German manufacturer Audi, produced from November 1999 (for the 2000 model year) to August 2005.

It is a five-door hatchback with four or five seats.

Based on the Audi Al_{2} concept car first shown at the Frankfurt Motor Show in 1997, the A2 was notable for being constructed from aluminium, which made it lightweight and alongside its efficient engines made it highly fuel efficient.

== History ==
The A2 was produced at Audi's "aluminium" Neckarsulm plant in Germany on a special line purpose-built for it. It was the first five-door vehicle on sale in Europe with an average fuel consumption less than 3 litres per 100 kilometres (94.2 mpg_{‑imp}; 78.4 mpg_{‑US}), although these figures only applied to the special "3L" version with a diesel engine, automatic gearbox, stop-start system, less power and narrower tyres. Due to its construction, the average A2 weighs 830 kg. The last A2s to be produced were built in August 2005.

== Styling ==
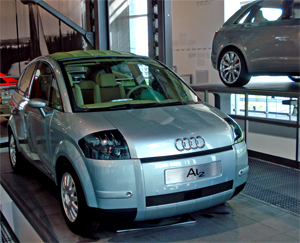
Audi Al_{2} concept car

The A2 was a surprise when it debuted only two years after the original Al_{2} study. Many initial reviews, including those from What Car? and Autocar in the UK commented on the design.

=== Autocar's initial drive verdict ===
"The best thing about the A2 is that it isn’t merely a design exercise. Yes, it’s a great car to look at, sit in and touch, but it’s also a riot to drive".

The avant-garde styling did not, however, win favour with some potential customers. Audi was reported to be disappointed with the level of sales. The final production was only 176,377 units, in comparison to rival Mercedes-Benz's A-Class sales of 1 million.

== Design, engineering and construction ==
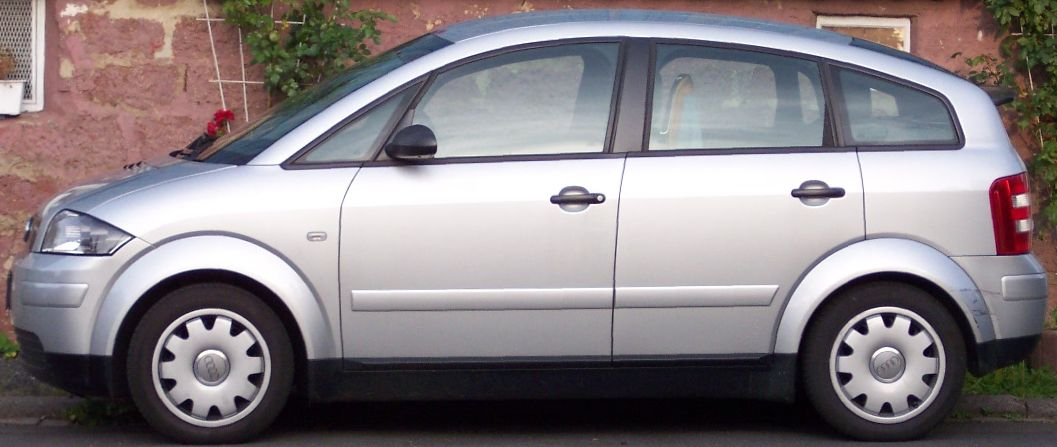
Audi A2 (side view)

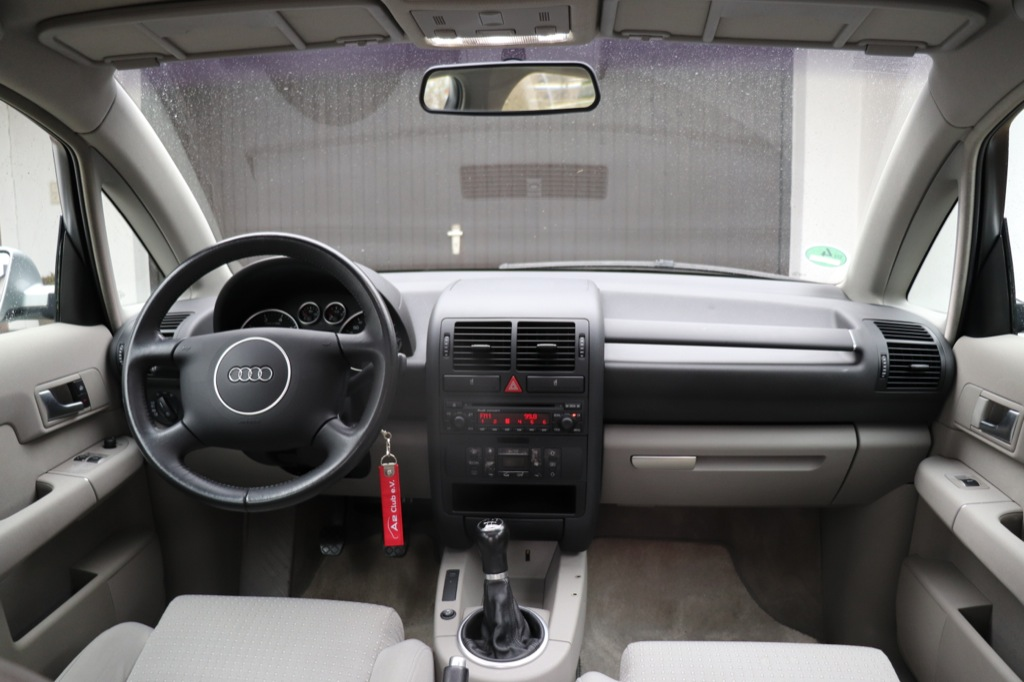
Audi A2 interior

The overriding theme in the design and engineering of the A2 was summarized by the then Audi UK product manager in an interview after the car won a design award in 2001 as "create a small Audi, not a cheap Audi", and the creative brief is said to have been "Transport four people from Stuttgart to Milan on a single tank of petrol".

The A2 is built with a considerable amount of aluminium and aluminium alloy, making it weigh significantly less than cars of this size, and use much less fuel than cars with traditional steel monocoques. Under certain circumstances, consumption for the 1.2 TDI model can be as low as just over 2 litres per 100 kilometres (140 mpg_{‑imp}; 120 mpg_{‑US}). This version of the Audi A2 won the "Nordic Eco Run" fuel economy race in 2003, with a consumption of 2.62 L/100 km (107.8 mpg_{‑imp}; 89.8 mpg_{‑US}). Even the normal versions with petrol engines are capable of 5 L/100 km (56.5 mpg_{‑imp}; 47.0 mpg_{‑US}). The A2 was also notable for being the first Audi model since the 1970s Audi 50 (type 86) and Audi 100 (type 43) not to be offered with its 'trademark' quattro four-wheel drive option. The A2 has a coefficient of drag of between 0.25 and 0.29, depending on the specific version.

The A2 still uses a contemporary unibody construction, with significant elements of space frame principles, and it is tagged by Audi as an 'Audi Space Frame' design. The outer panels of the body have little or no structural function – similarities exist with the original Renault Espace – and the space frame bears the forces working on the car. The frame uses casts and extrusions which are laser welded together to make the space frame. Improvements in shell stability, durability and stiffness, lower weight, and more interior space are results of its construction. "The A2, on the other hand, was designed as an aluminum car and the spaceframe has been optimized by parts consolidation, using large, cost-effective castings instead of aluminum stampings".

Unfortunately, the cost of working with aluminium, particularly with small production runs, meant that the A2 was more expensive than other cars in its sector, competing with the A-class and losing. Much of the high production cost was due to so many parts not being "off the shelf" and being specifically optimized for the A2. From Autobild in 2003: "The A2 is not one of the models with the highest return on investment". The same article quotes the sales figures for 2002 as being 20,000 in Germany against 80,000 for the A-Class and "...lots of money for a car that is only 3.8m long."

Audi was the first manufacturer to try to incorporate lightweight building concepts using aluminium and associated alloys into a "mass market" vehicle. Previous efforts at using the Audi Space Frame were limited to the rather more expensive Audi A8. As a guide to the mass involved, the entire shell weighs so little that two people can easily pick it up, and the side panel over the doors including the A- and D-pillars weighs approximately 2 kg (4 lb). A 2002 model A2 with standard equipment has a mass of 895 kg (1,973 lb).

=== Interior ===
The A2 has a large interior space for the exterior dimensions, including a boot with 390 litres (13.8 cu ft) of space when the rear seats are in place. This is significantly larger than the luggage space of the next model in Audi's range, the Audi A3. Due to the "sandwich"-type construction, similar again to that of the Renault Espace or the Mercedes A-Class, the floorpan has an upper and a lower portion. The space in the middle is used to house various components, such as the fuel tank and the engine's electronics. The rear passengers also benefit, as their foot space reaches into this sandwich space, creating a comfortable seating position even for tall rear seat passengers. This is in direct contrast to the comfort available on the rear bench of an A-Class. To improve the weight distribution of the vehicle, its battery is located inside the boot, under the floor.

The A2's interior was very upmarket in comparison with other superminis. In both the UK and Europe, there were several choices of seat material and colour, comprising the standard Cirrus cloth, optional Matrix cloth, optional Alcantara/leather, or full pearl Nappa leather seat coverings. Sport models received sport seats with electrically adjustable lumbar support as standard in jacquard satin cloth.

=== Service hatch (Serviceklappe) ===
The front of the car included an unusual design feature called the "Serviceklappe" in German – this translates to "service hatch" or "service panel". On early cars, this was a glossy black panel at the lower edge of the bonnet, where the radiator grille would normally be sited. Behind it are the filling points for oil and windshield washer fluid, and the dipstick.

The bonnet was widely rumoured to be sealed – Car and Driver wrote: "...feature of the A2 that may foretell the future: the sealed hood". Actually, the bonnet is easily removed, being held in place by two twist-lock catches. The bonnet, weighing 8 kg, then comes away from the car altogether, unlike the usual hinged flip-up arrangement on most other cars. Due to the service hatch, the bonnet does not need to be removed frequently for access to the engine.

== Facelift and additional models ==
The service hatch is the most obvious indicator of the age of any particular A2. It was changed to matte black for the "color.storm" colour schemes, and for 2004, it acquired fake grille slats. However, it can be changed easily, so it should not be taken as a reliable age indicator. Very little else was changed externally during the life of the car. Colours and wheels designs were changed mildly during the production run. The only other external indicator of the age of the car is the windscreen wiper. Very early models have a traditional blade, but starting in 2002, newer cars have a "flex" version ("Aerotwin" from Bosch, model 760).

=== Changes and additions ===
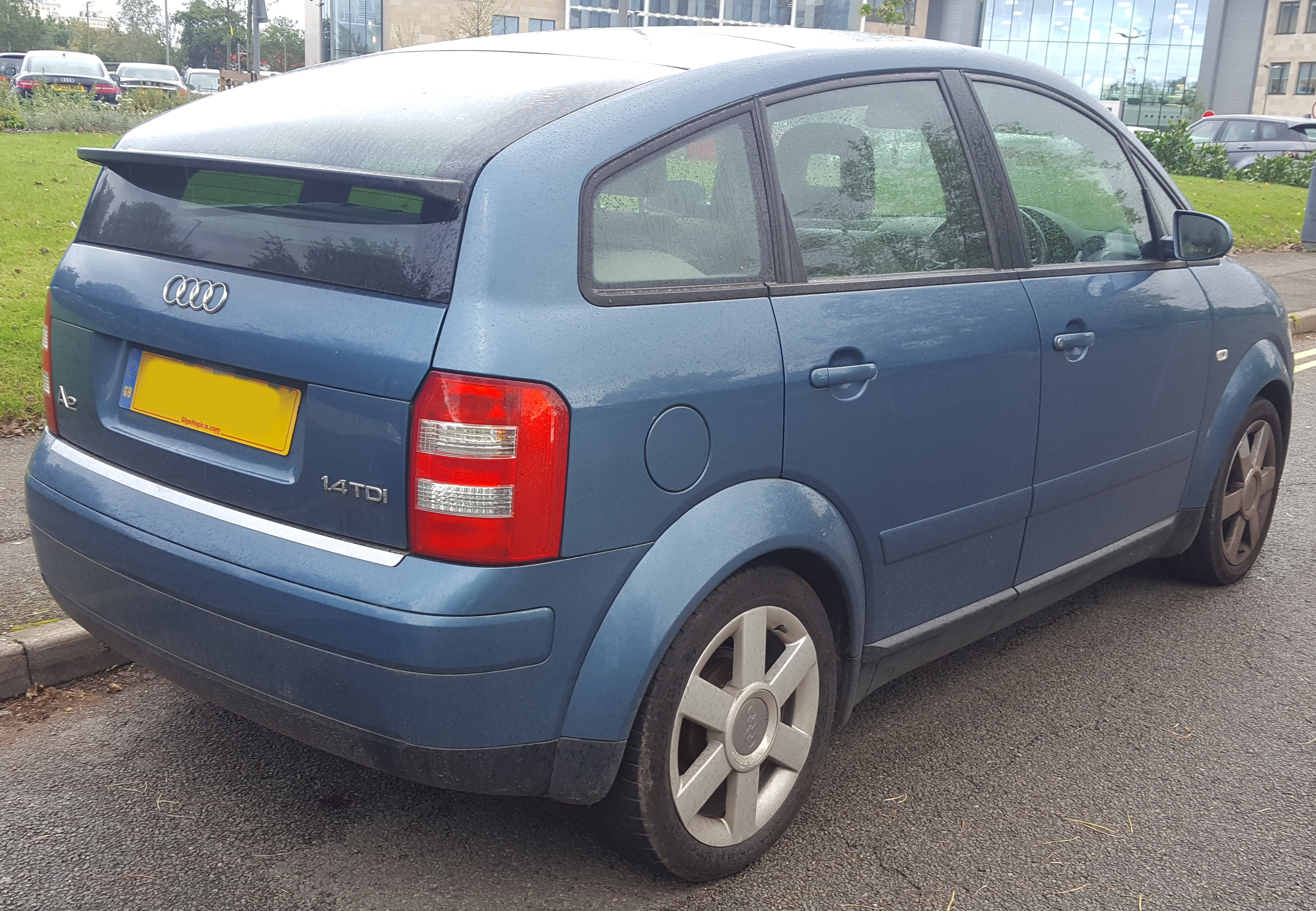
Pre-facelift Audi A2 TDI (UK)

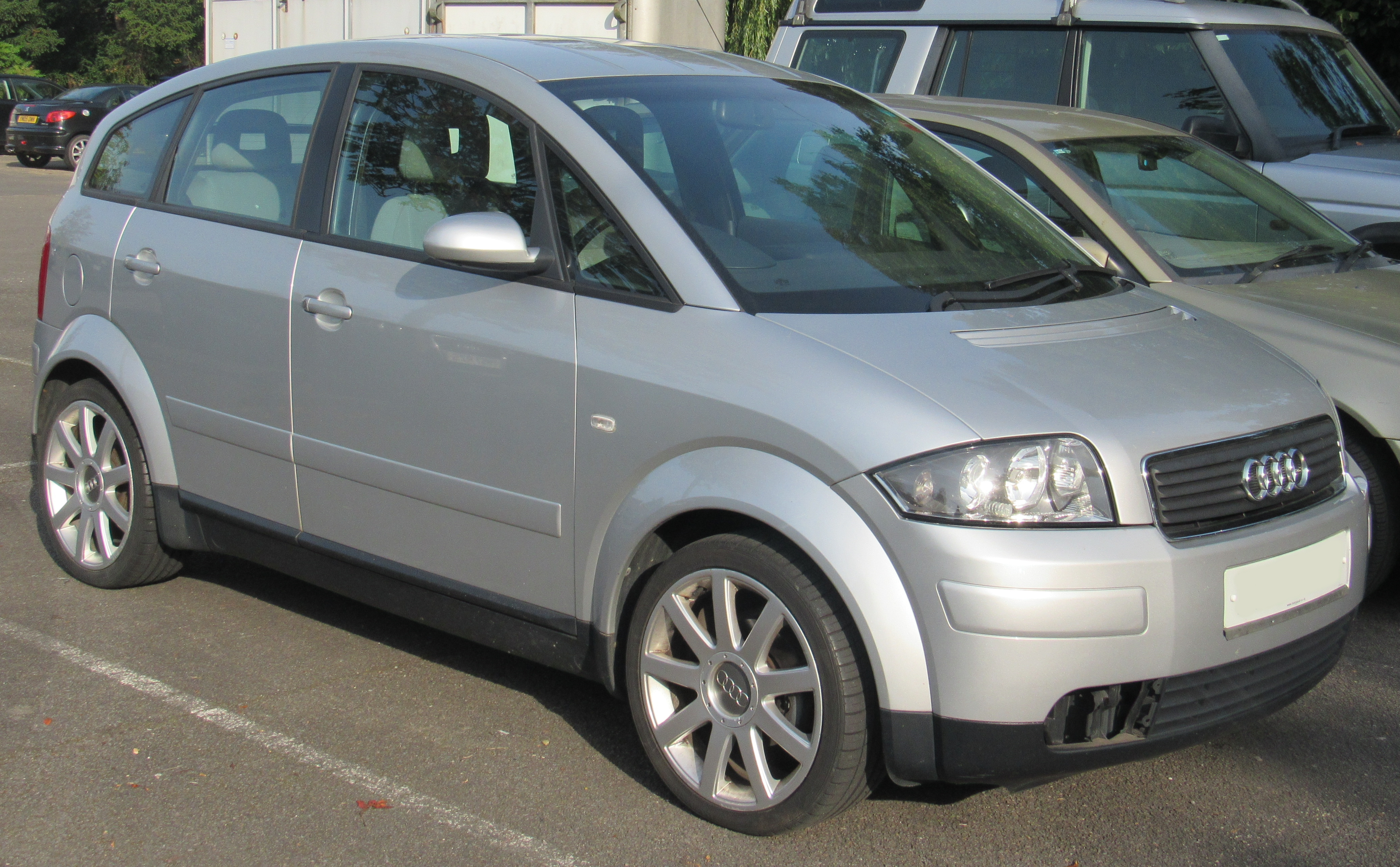
Facelift Audi A2

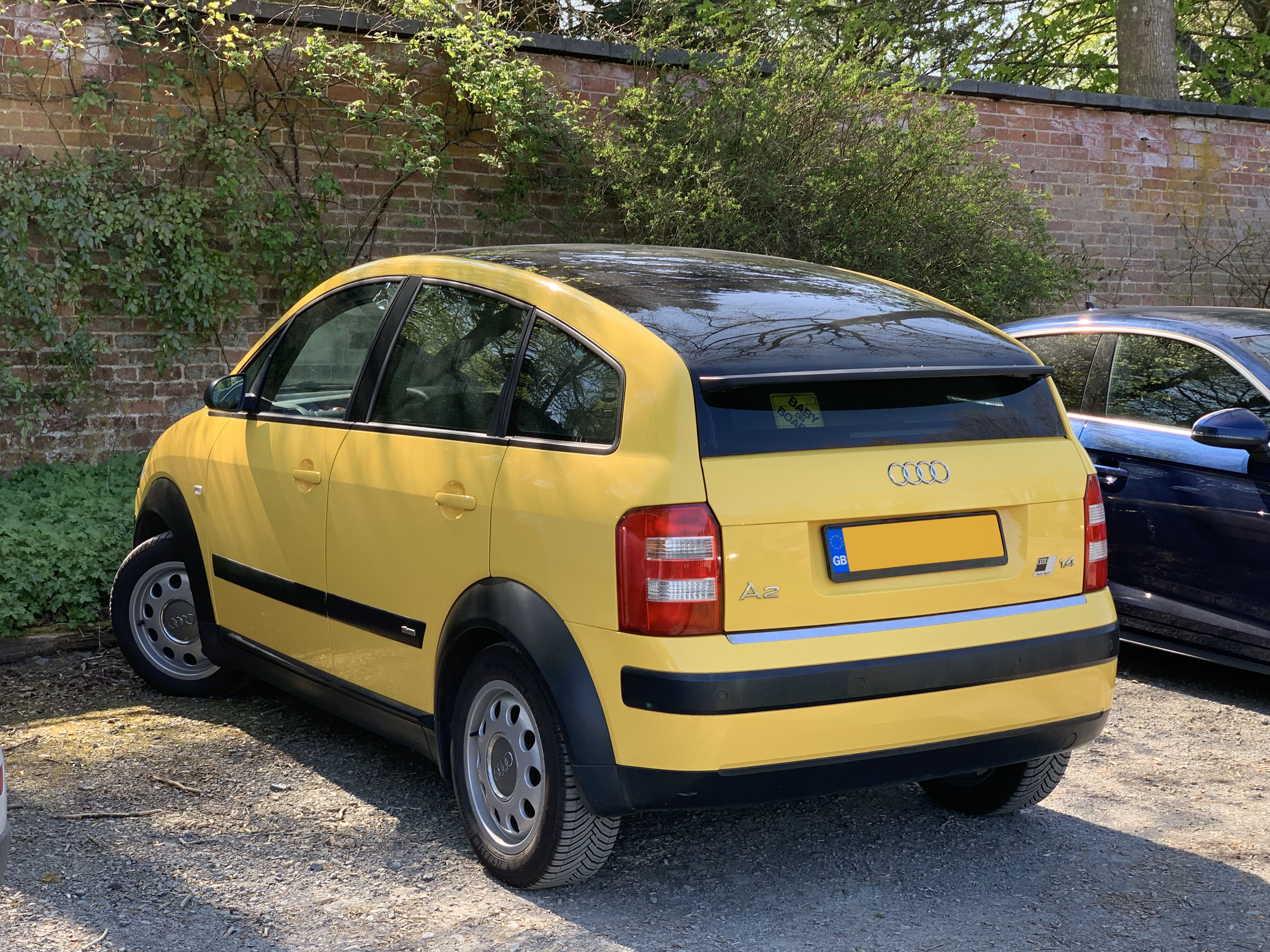
Audi A2 painted in Imola Yellow

=== 2000–2001 ===
- February 2000: introduction of the A2 with 75 PS (55 kW; 74 hp) petrol engine
- September 2000: introduction of the 75 PS (55 kW; 74 hp) diesel
- June 2001: introduction of the 1.2 TDI engine in 3L into mainland European market.

=== 2002–2003 ===
- CAN-BUS is used for the OBD systems, as required by EU Regulations.
- Aerotwin wiper
- Aluminium trim pack becomes standard equipment in the UK
- Diesel-engined A2s after May 2002 no longer have a pre-heater run by diesel, but a powerful internal electrical heating element.
- May 2002: Use of the 42l petrol tank in all non 3l versions. 3l available with 21l standard tank or 34l tank, allowing a theoretical 1100 km range.
- June 2002: 1.6 FSI engine introduced with the larger (42l) petrol tank and re-modelled rear spoiler (higher position, larger size to increase high speed stability). Non S-line FSI's featured re-tuned softer suspension tuning due to many complaints over the harsh ride of other models
- The first color.storms (in 'Misano' red, 'Imola' yellow and 'Sprint' blue) became available. These brought colours which had only previously been available on S and RS models or as an Audi Exclusive option to the standard colour chart.
- Diesel engines used after September 2003, engine code BHC, fulfil the requirements for Euro4 exhaust emissions, again as a result of legislation.
- Spare tyre and tyre repair kit delete becomes a paid-for optional extra in the UK

=== 2003–2004 ===
- Extended color.storm colour options, including 'Papaya' orange and later 'Avus' silver
- September / October 2003: Availability of the 90 PS (66 kW; 89 hp) TDI. Grille now with slats (but still solid), new Matrix cloth replaces both satellite and jacquard-satin cloth, yellow leather no longer available, additional external colours available including Akoya Silver and Mauritius Blue, New Wheel designs became available
- Use of MK60 ESP / ABS system.
- FSI and 90 PS (66 kW; 89 hp) TDI engines phased out towards late 2004/early 2005

=== 2005 ===
- Special Edition (including CD player and climate control) models introduced into UK markets, at this time no other models were available in the UK
- Audi lost an estimated £4,000 on every A2 they sold and only made money on cars with optional extras. Continued production of the model was reviewed by the board of directors
- Production of the A2 is halted by VW/Audi group boss Bernd Pischetsrieder. Overall, Audi lost €7,530 per vehicle produced.

=== Lekker/DBM electric version ===
In October 2010, an A2 converted to electric power by Lekker Energie and DBM Energy completed an early morning 600-kilometre (370 mi) drive from Munich to Berlin on a single charge. Upon arrival, Rainer Bruederle, Germany's Economics Minister, called the test drive a "world record."

The car was said to still have 18% of its charge remaining on arrival in Berlin and the average speed was reported as being 90 km/h (56 mph). The "kolibri" batteries used in the design are so compact that the vehicle retains its four seats and boot space. A production version would be possible. "The technology could be implemented today. It is up to industry to use this potential," commented Mirko Hannemann, the head of DBM.

== 1.2 TDI "3L" ==
The Audi A2 1.2 TDI tied the lowest drag coefficient of any car in the world at the time of its launch, matching that of the first generation Honda Insight. It was also one of the most economical and least polluting, only emitting 81 g/km (German emission standard D4) to 86 g/km (D3 emission standard) CO_{2} emissions. The Audi A2 3L reuses the engine and special gearbox developed for the equally efficient Volkswagen Lupo 1.2 TDI 3L.

Two versions of the car were available in Germany during its production run. The D4 version, which used only 3 L/100 km (94 mpg_{‑imp}; 78 mpg_{‑US}), was "standard." It had no power steering, air conditioning or other extras, with the only optional extra being body coloured door handles and wing mirrors. There were no optional extras because optional equipment adds weight and therefore reduces economy. It had a fixed rear seat cushion. The tested fuel economy was 2.88 L/100 km.

The second version was a D3 version which was still capable of 3.0 L/100 km. This version had options for air conditioning, a winter package, and a comfort package, but was not available in all markets.

Both versions had thinner glass, lighter seats, and 14" magnesium alloy wheels. The standard tyre fitment was 145/80 R14 T76 Bridgestone Ecopias or Continental Winter Tyres using very flat wheel covers to minimize turbulence. The engine block was also made from a light alloy, so even though it was a diesel, it weighed just 100 kg (220 lb).

The car had an automated manual transmission with a Tiptronic mode on the selector. The car also had an ECO mode. When engaged it limited the power to 41 bhp (31 kW; 42 PS) (excluding kick down) and programmed the transmission to change up at the most economical point. ECO mode also activated the start/stop function, a feature that was new to European cars at the time.

A total of 6450 1.2 TDI models were built.

== Technical specifications ==
The following internal combustion engines were available:

Engine name	Displacement / Configuration	Max. power	Max. torque	Engine ID Code(s)	0-100 km/h (62 mph) (seconds)	Top speed	Fuel consumption	Years produced
Petrol engines all fuel injected
1.4 16v	1390 cc inline 4cyl 16v DOHC	55 kW (75 PS; 74 bhp) @ 5,000 rpm	126 N⋅m (93 lbf⋅ft) @ 3,800 rpm	AUA, BBY	12.3 sec	173 km/h (107.5 mph)	6.0 L/100 km (47.1 mpg_{‑imp}; 39.2 mpg_{‑US})	06/00–04/02; 05/02–08/05
1.6 FSI	1598 cc inline 4cyl 16v DOHC; Fuel Stratified Injection (FSI)	81 kW (110 PS; 109 bhp) @ 5,800 rpm	155 N⋅m (114 lbf⋅ft) @ 4,400 rpm	BAD	9.8 sec	202 km/h (125.5 mph)	5.9 L/100 km (47.9 mpg_{‑imp}; 39.9 mpg_{‑US})	05/02–08/05
Diesel engines all Turbocharged Direct Injection (TDI)
1.2 TDI aka: 3L	1191 cc inline 3cyl SOHC	45 kW (61 PS; 60 bhp) @ 4,000 rpm	140 N⋅m (103 lbf⋅ft) @ 1,800–2,400 rpm	ANY	14.9 sec	168 km/h (104.4 mph)	3.0 L/100 km (94.2 mpg_{‑imp}; 78.4 mpg_{‑US})	03/01–08/05
1.4 TDI	1422 cc inline 3cyl SOHC	55 kW (75 PS; 74 bhp) @ 4,000 rpm	195 N⋅m (144 lbf⋅ft) @ 2,200 rpm	AMF, BHC	12.6 sec	173 km/h (107.5 mph)	4.3 L/100 km (65.7 mpg_{‑imp}; 54.7 mpg_{‑US})	06/00–08/03; 09/03–08/05
1.4 TDI	1422 cc inline 3cyl SOHC	66 kW (90 PS; 89 bhp) @ 4,000 rpm	230 N⋅m (170 lbf⋅ft) @ 1,900–2,200 rpm	ATL	10.9 sec	188 km/h (116.8 mph)	4.3 L/100 km (65.7 mpg_{‑imp}; 54.7 mpg_{‑US})	11/03–08/05

== A2 Concept (2011) ==
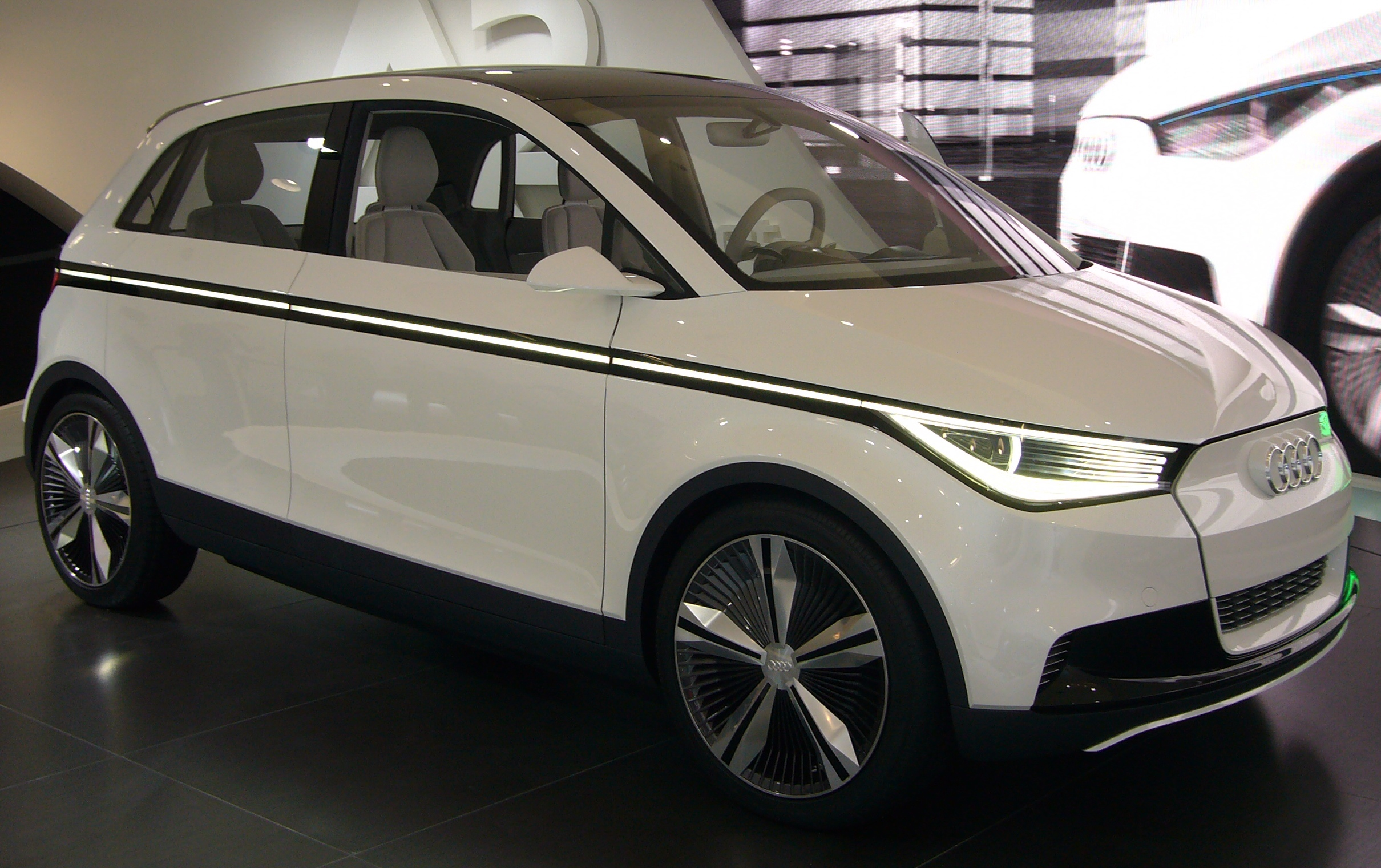
2011 Audi A2 concept car

At the Frankfurt Motor Show in September 2011, Audi exhibited an entirely electric concept car, the A2 concept, previewing an expected new A2 production model. The superstructure made largely from aluminium, additional parts in Carbon Fibre-Reinforced Polymer, and other construction techniques restrain the weight to only 1,150 kg.

A lithium-ion battery placed between the floor holds 24 kWh of usable charge. An electric motor is transversely mounted at the front of the vehicle, the electric motor delivers through the front wheels and uses a single-speed transmission. The vehicle will also incorporate shift-by-wire, brake-by-wire and steer-by-wire contactless technology, and LED matrix technology for the headlights and tail lights.

In June 2012, the UK's Car Magazine reported that Audi had put the electric A2 project on hold indefinitely, following disappointing European sales of other EVs, like the Nissan Leaf & Mitsubishi i-MiEV, and a projected retail price of over €40,000.

It was reported that, according to the director of e-mobility and sustainability strategy at Audi of America, the A2 electric concept was not a developmental prototype with a test program, but a one-off concept car to be shown at auto shows.

=== Technical specifications (2011 A2 concept) ===
Engine	Transmission	Maximum Power	Maximum Torque	Top Speed	Acceleration 0–100 km/h (0–62 mph)	Battery capacity and Range	Charge Time	Weight
Electric Motor	1 Speed	85 kW (59 kW Continuous)	270 Nm (160 Nm Continuous)	Limited to 150 km/h (93 mph)	9.3 s	31 kWh; 200 km (124 Miles)	4 hours (240 V) 1.5 hours (400 V)	1,150 kg

== Nameplate revival (2026) ==
In March 2026, Audi announced the A2 e-tron, a new battery electric compact car that revives the nameplate, featuring compact MPV looks.

== Sales figures ==
Year	Europe sales
2000	17,781
2001	51,517
2002	39,914
2003	28,647
2004	22,136
2005	13,026
2006	421

== See also ==
- Mercedes A-Class
