= Son of Dave =

Canadian musician

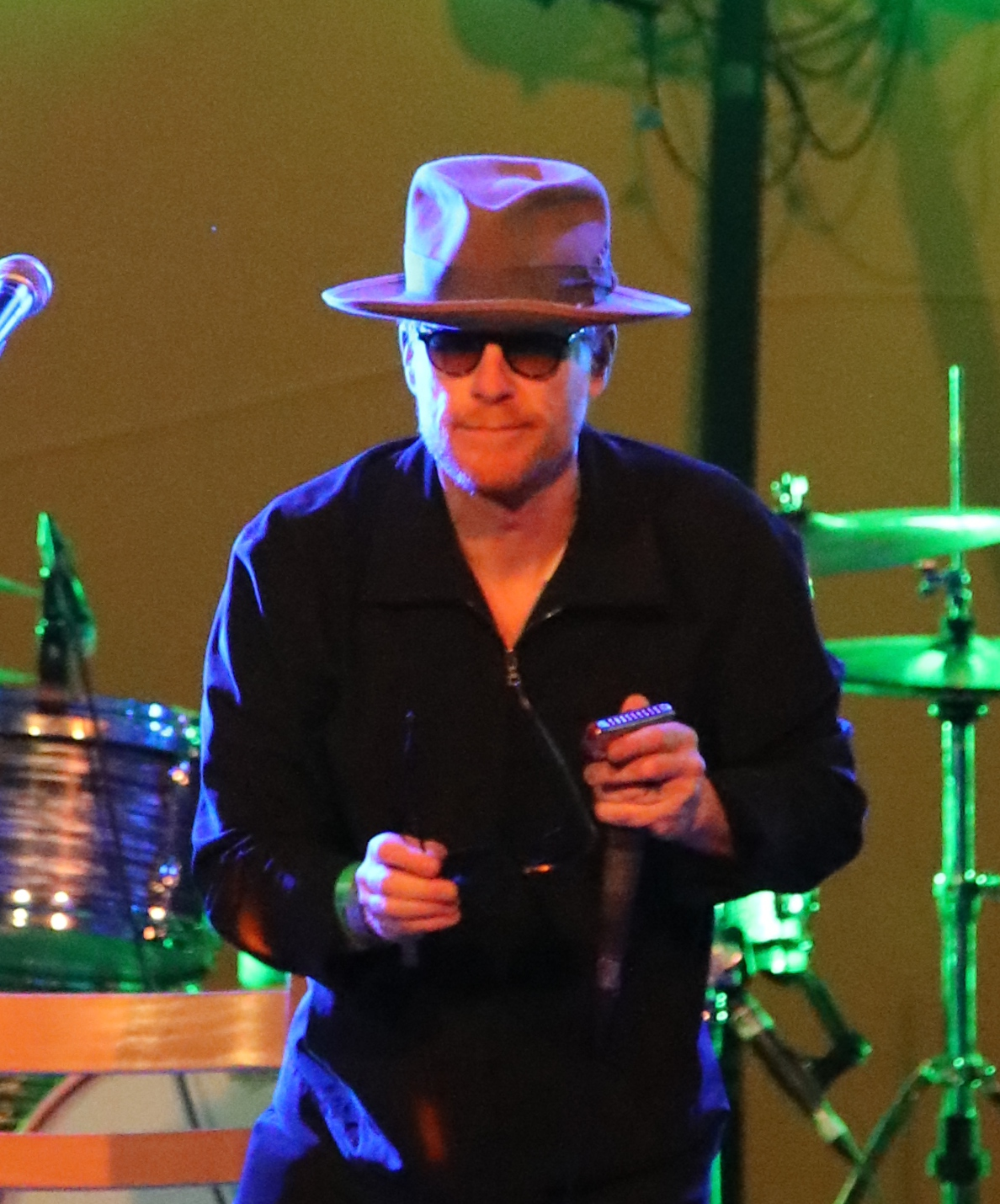
- Benjamin Darvill as Son of Dave in 2017

Background information
- Born: Benjamin Darvill; January 4, 1967 (age 59); Winnipeg, Manitoba, Canada
- Origin: London, England
- Genres: Rock; folk rock; blues
- Occupations: Singer-songwriter; musician
- Instruments: Vocals; harmonica; mandolin; guitar; percussion
- Years active: 1989 – present
- Formerly of: Crash Test Dummies
- Website: Official site

Benjamin Darvill (born January 4, 1967), known by his stage name Son of Dave, is a Canadian singer-songwriter and musician, based in Winnipeg. He was a member of the folk rock band Crash Test Dummies in which he played harmonica, mandolin, guitar and percussion before returning to his blues, Beat-Box and harmonica driven solo work in 2000.

== Early life ==
Darvill was born in Winnipeg, Manitoba. He was inspired to learn the harmonica after hearing James Cotton and Sonny Terry play at the Winnipeg Folk Festival. Darvill's "first claim to blues fame" was as a member of The Detonators.

== Career ==
Darvill lived in London, England, from 1998 to 2021, when he returned to his hometown. He began playing as Son of Dave while in London, and has recorded 11 albums and performed over 1400 shows across the world, including appearances at Glastonbury and the Montreux Jazz Festival.

Son of Dave appeared on the BBC Television show Later...with Jools Holland in 2005, performing the song "Hellhound", before recording the song a few years later on the album O3.

His 2003 album O2 has been described as a mix of "cotton-pickin' blues, vocalising beat-box, hard-breathing folk, steamy funk and even modern R&B". The following album O3 was cited as "perhaps the biggest leap forward for the blues since John Lee Hooker bought his first electric guitar."

Son of Dave's Shake a Bone album was recorded with Steve Albini, and positively reviewed as an album with "strong work ethic and genuine passion enthused on the record" in The Independent, with "something terribly satisfying about the primitive nature of his yelps and purrs and the relentless pounding of the lo-fi drumbeat" and "some catchy songs."

Several Son of Dave songs have been included in film and television, including the track "Shake A Bone" from the album of the same title, which was featured on season 3 episode 11 of Breaking Bad, and from the O2 album "Devil Take My Soul", which features chorus vocal by Martina Topley-Bird - was featured in the Warner Bros film, License to Wed, starring Robin Williams, and in 2016, the track "Voodoo Doll" from Shake A Bone was featured as the last song in the first episode of Preacher, an AMC series based on the comic book of the same title.

In 2010, Son of Dave and his song "Revolution Town" were featured in a commercial for the search engine Bing. The commercial, using a first-person perspective, shows Son of Dave using Bing and his Windows-enabled phone to travel to his own concert at the Someday Lounge in Portland, Oregon.

His 2022 album Call Me a Cab "appears to be fun-loving, old-school, New Orleans rhythm and blues" that is "all about the rhythm." That album led to Son of Dave being nominated for Blues Artist of the Year at the 2022 Western Canada Music Awards.

Son of Dave's 2024 release A Flat City is a "gritty, bluesy" reflection on his return to Winnipeg.

== Other work ==
Darvill has collected 45 rpm vinyl records for many years, and that led to hosting a radio program - Son of Dave's Filthy 45s - on Radio Soho from 2012 to 2021. Previous to that, he wrote for The Stool Pigeon, and a collection of those columns was published as We Need You Lazzarro You Lazy Greasy Bastard.

Back in Winnipeg, he has hosted a series of cabaret events entitled The Super Elite.

== Discography ==
- B. Darvill's Wild West Show (1999) Kartel 019
- O1 (2000) Kartel 002
- O2 (2006) Kartel 003
- O3 (2008) Kartel 013
- Shake a Bone (2010) Kartel 023
- Blues at the Grand (2013) Kartel SOD001
- Explosive Hits (2016) Goddamn Records SOD002
- Music for Cop Shows (2017) Goddamn Records SOD003
- Call Me a Cab (2021) Goddamn Records SOD004
- Call Me King (2022) Goddamn Records SOD005
- A Flat City (2024) Goddamn Records SOD006
