= Audi A2 e-tron =

Battery electric compact car

Overview
- Manufacturer: Audi
- Production: September 2026 – present
- Assembly: Germany: Ingolstadt
- Designer: Jakob Hirzel

Body and chassis
- Class: Compact car (C)
- Body style: 5-door hatchback
- Layout: Rear-motor, rear-wheel drive
- Platform: Volkswagen Group MEB
- Related: Volkswagen ID.3; Audi Q4 e-tron

Powertrain
- Electric motor: APP 350 PMSM; APP 550 PMSM
- Power output: 125–240 kW (168–322 hp; 170–326 PS)
- Battery: 52 or 61 kWh LFP; 84 kWh NMC
- Electric range: 423–645 km (263–401 mi) (WLTP)
- Plug-in charging: DC: 105–183

Dimensions
- Wheelbase: 2,770 mm (109.1 in)
- Length: 4,321 mm (170.1 in)
- Width: 1,791 mm (70.5 in)
- Height: 1,549 mm (61.0 in)

Chronology
- Predecessor: Audi A2 (spiritual)

The Audi A2 e-tron is an upcoming battery electric (C-segment) compact car manufactured by the German automaker Audi starting in late 2026, positioned as the brand’s new entry-level model.

Its styling is heavily inspired by the original model produced from 1999 to 2005.

== Overview ==
=== Development ===
The A2 e-tron was officially unveiled on 7 September 2026.

It resurrects Audi's A2 nameplate after 21 years, taking heavy inspiration from the original model in its styling, form factor, and market positioning. The A2 e-tron indirectly replaces the A1 supermini and Q2 subcompact crossover SUV as the entry model in Audi's lineup.

Audi says that due to new development processes implemented to counter the rapid iteration of Chinese competition, the A2 e-tron's time to development was reduced by 21 months compared to previous models' development cycles.

Rear view

Interior

=== Design ===
The A2 e-tron's exterior takes on a form in between a compact hatchback and an MPV, with a short nose, heavily slanted windscreen, tall body with a tapered roofline, leading to a "Kammback" featuring a split rear window. Compared to the original model, it is significantly longer and wider while retaining a similar height, leading to relatively conventional proportions. The front fascia features split headlights, comprising an upper part with four configurable light signatures and a lower part housing the main headlight functions, located within a black panel. Instead of conventional door handles, the A2 e-tron uses winglet-style openers that also improve aerodynamic efficiency.

According to Audi, the A2 e-tron has a drag coefficient of 0.24 Cd, which is 0.01 lower than its predecessor. This was possible due to optimizations such as active grille shutters which close when required, aerodynamic alloy wheel covers, additional air scoops, a closed underside of the body, and wheel arch extensions.

=== Interior ===
The interior is made from a range of recycled soft-touch materials, with the aim of creating an "atmosphere of well-being". A curved glass module similar to other Audi models houses an 11.9-inch instrument cluster and a 12.8-inch main central MMI display. The steering wheel features a mix of capacitive controls and a physical "click wheel" controller. A column-mounted gear shifter is used, alongside plastic paddles that can adjust the regenerative braking across four levels of intensity. The front also features two Qi 2.2-compatible wireless chargers, with active cooling and a peak charging rate of 25 W. The trunk has a capacity of 396 L (14.0 cu ft), expanding to 1,336 L (47.2 cu ft) when the second row seats are folded down.

== Powertrain ==
The A2 e-tron has three battery options: 50 kWh and 58 kWh lithium iron phosphate (LFP) packs, or a larger 79 kWh nickel manganese cobalt (NMC) pack. The LFP batteries have a peak charging rate of up to 105 kW, charging from 10–80% in 29 minutes, while the NMC battery increases the rate to 183 kW, completing 10–80% in 24 minutes. It is also equipped with vehicle-to-load (V2L) and vehicle-to-home (V2H) technologies.

Battery		Drive	Motor	Power	Torque	Range	0–100 km/h (62 mph)
Capacity	Type	Drive	Motor	Power	Torque	WLTP	0–100 km/h (62 mph)
50 kWh	LFP	RWD	Single	168 hp (125 kW)	TBD	263 mi (423 km)	8.8 s
58 kWh	LFP	RWD	Single	187 hp (139 kW)	350 N⋅m (260 lb⋅ft)	320 mi (515 km)	7.9 s
79 kWh	NMC	RWD	Single	228 hp (170 kW)	TBD	401 mi (645 km)	7.0 s
79 kWh	NMC	RWD	Single	322 hp (240 kW)	545 N⋅m (402 lb⋅ft)	391 mi (629 km)	5.7 s
