= N20 =

N20 may refer to:

== Roads ==
- Route nationale 20, in France
- N20 road (Ireland)
- Navajo Route 20, in Arizona, United States

== Other uses ==
- N20 (Long Island bus)
- BMW N20, an automobile engine
- EFW N-20, a Swiss jet fighter aircraft
- London Buses route N20
- Nitrogen-20, an isotope of nitrogen
- Toyota Hilux (N20), a Japanese pickup truck
- N20, a postcode district in the London N postcode area

== See also ==
- N2O (disambiguation), with a letter O in place of a zero
- 20N (disambiguation)
