= Q2 =

Q2 or Q-2 may refer to:

== Media and broadcasting ==
- KZJO, a television station in Seattle, Washington, United States, which formerly held the call sign KMYQ and was known on air as "MyQ²"
- KTVQ, a television station in Billings, Montana, United States known on air as "Q2"
- Q2 (TV channel), a Belgian television station
- Q2, a short-lived spinoff network of QVC in the 1990s
- Q2, a Star Trek character played by Corbin Bernsen
- "Q2" (Star Trek: Voyager), an episode of Star Trek: Voyager
- Q2, a contemporary classical music internet radio station run by New York's WQXR

== Transportation ==
- Air Cargo Carriers, a cargo airline with the IATA code 2Q
- PRR Q2, a class of steam locomotive
- Metrobus route Q2, a bus route in Washington, D.C.
- Q2 (New York City bus)
- Alfa Romeo's limited-slip differential
- Audi Q2, a mini SUV by German manufacturer

== Other uses ==
- The second quarter of a calendar year (April, May, June) or fiscal year
- The second quarto of William Shakespeare's works
- Q2 (statistics), the second quartile in descriptive statistics (i.e. the median)
- Q2 Stadium, a sports stadium in Austin, Texas
- Quake II, first person shooter game developed by id Software and distributed by Activision
- Quran 2, al-baqarah, the 2nd chapter of the Islamic Holy book
- Leica Q2, a digital camera
- The Earth, which has Wikidata identifier Q2
- The Q2B siren ("Q-siren" or Q2), an electromechanical siren produced by Federal Signal Corporation

== See also ==
- 02 (disambiguation)
- 2Q (disambiguation)
