= O2 (Son of Dave album) =

Studio album by Son of Dave
- Released: 13 February 2006
- Genre: Blues
- Length: 39:00
- Label: Kartel

Son of Dave chronology
O1 (2000)	O2 (2006)	O3 (2008)

O2 is the third studio album by Son of Dave. It was released in 2006 on Kartel Records. The album includes original songs as well as three covers of blues classics.

The album was rated 4 out of 5 stars by AllMusic.

== Track listing ==
No.	Title	Length
1.	"Leave without Runnin"	3:25
2.	"Goddamn"	3:31
3.	"Get You Back"	2:13
4.	"San Francisco"	4:10
5.	"Devil Take My Soul" (featuring Martina Topley-Bird)	4:16
6.	"Crossroad Blues"	3:48
7.	"I Got What You Need"	3:49
8.	"Crickets"	0:51
9.	"Life Is So Easy Now"	4:17
10.	"Rollin' and Tumblin'"	4:34
11.	"Mannish Boy"	4:11
