= Audi Q2 =

Subcompact luxury crossover SUV

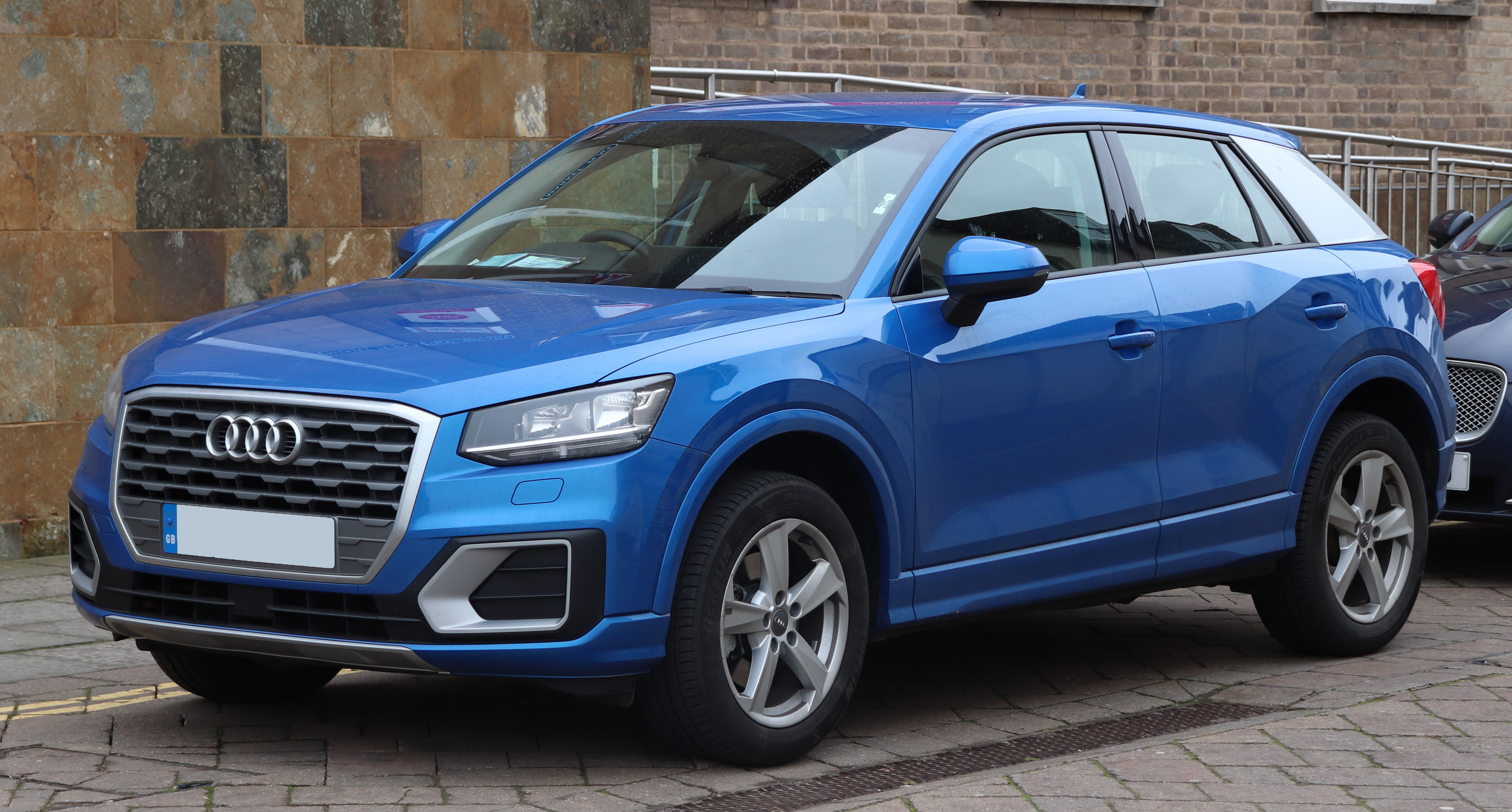

Overview
- Manufacturer: Audi AG
- Production: 2016 – April 2026; 887,231 units
- Model years: 2017–2026
- Assembly: Germany: Ingolstadt; China: Foshan (FAW-VW: Q2L); Algeria: Relizane (SOVAC)
- Designer: Matthias Fink and Dre Ahn under Marc Lichte

Body and chassis
- Class: Subcompact luxury crossover SUV
- Body style: 5-door SUV
- Layout: Front-engine, front-wheel-drive or all-wheel-drive; Front-motor, front-wheel-drive (Q2L 30 e-tron)
- Platform: Volkswagen Group MQB A1
- Related: Volkswagen T-Roc; Volkswagen Taos/Tharu; SEAT Ateca; Škoda Karoq; Audi A3 Mk3

Powertrain
- Engine: Petrol: 1.0 TFSI I3 turbo; 1.4 TFSI COD I4 turbo; 2.0 TFSI I4 turbo; Diesel: 1.6 TDI I4 turbo; 2.0 TDI I4 turbo
- Electric motor: 100 kW (140 PS; 130 hp) AC asynchronous motor (Q2L e-tron)
- Transmission: 6-speed manual; 7-speed S tronic automatic; 8-speed Tiptronic automatic; Single-speed fixed gear (Q2L e-tron)
- Battery: 38 kWh Li-ion (Q2L e-Tron)

Dimensions
- Wheelbase: 2,601 mm (102.4 in); 2,628 mm (103.5 in) (Q2L)
- Length: 4,191 mm (165.0 in); 4,229 mm (166.5 in) (Q2L)
- Width: 1,794 mm (70.6 in)
- Height: 1,508 mm (59.4 in)
- Curb weight: 1,205 kg (2,657 lb)

Chronology
- Successor: Audi A3 allstreet; Audi A2 e-tron

The Audi Q2 is a subcompact luxury crossover SUV developed and manufactured by the German car manufacturer Audi, a subsidiary of the Volkswagen Group. It was first unveiled to the public on 1 March 2016 at the 2016 Geneva Motor Show and built on the Volkswagen Group MQB A1 platform as the Mk7 series Volkswagen Golf. The car is manufactured at the headquarters of Audi in Ingolstadt, Germany; by FAW-Volkswagen in Foshan, China; and in Relizane, Algeria by SOVAC-Volkswagen.

== Overview ==
The Q2 has been sold in European markets since November 2016. Unlike Audi's other crossovers, the Q2 is not sold in the United States or Canada. A long-wheelbase version called the Q2L is sold in China.

The Q2L e-tron is an all-electric version that has been built and sold in China since November 2019. Powered by a 38 kWh lithium-ion battery of Chinese supplier Contemporary Amperex Technology, the Q2L e-tron has a range of 265 kilometres (165 miles) on one charge and a top speed of 150 km/h (93 mph). Its electric motor delivers the maximum power of 100 kW (134 hp) and maximum torque of 290 N⋅m (214 lb⋅ft).

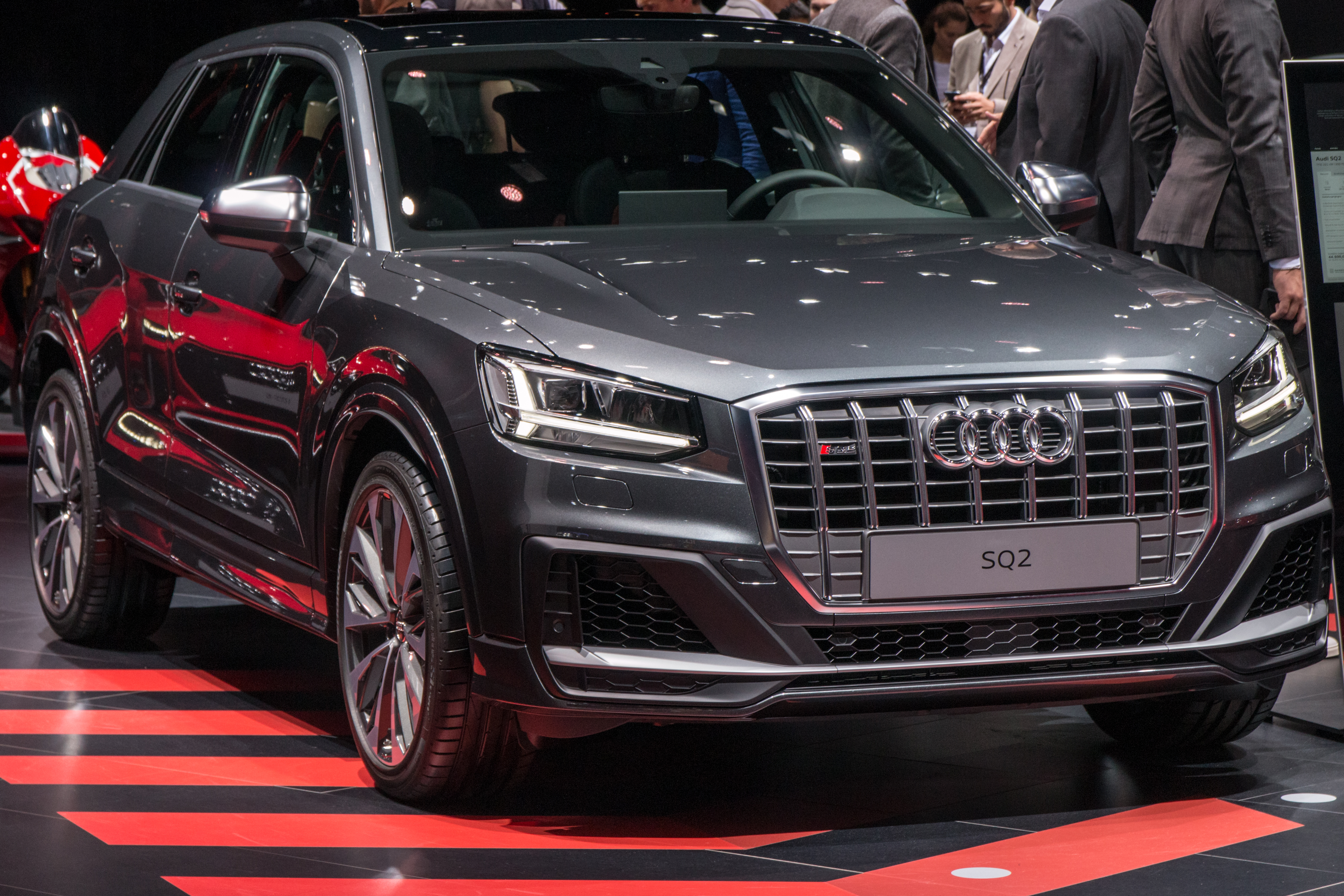
SQ2 at IAA 2019

The SQ2 was previewed in 2018 at the Paris Motor Show. It is equipped with a 2.0 TFSI 4-cylinder which makes 295 hp (220 kW; 299 PS) at 5,200 rpm. The top speed is electronically limited to 250 km/h (155 mph).

In February 2022, Volkswagen AG confirmed that the Audi Q2 will not see a second generation and will instead be discontinued without a direct successor planned after the model completes its life cycle, due to poor sales and plans to shift Audi into selling larger premium crossovers and SUVs.

=== Design ===
The Q2's front face is formed flat and in an upwards slant, like the other models of Audi's Q Series. The interior incorporates a 5.8-inch Audi MMI display and a 12.3-inch virtual cockpit display.

The car also employs an LED ambient lighting system, which projects differently coloured light into the car, depending on the time of day.

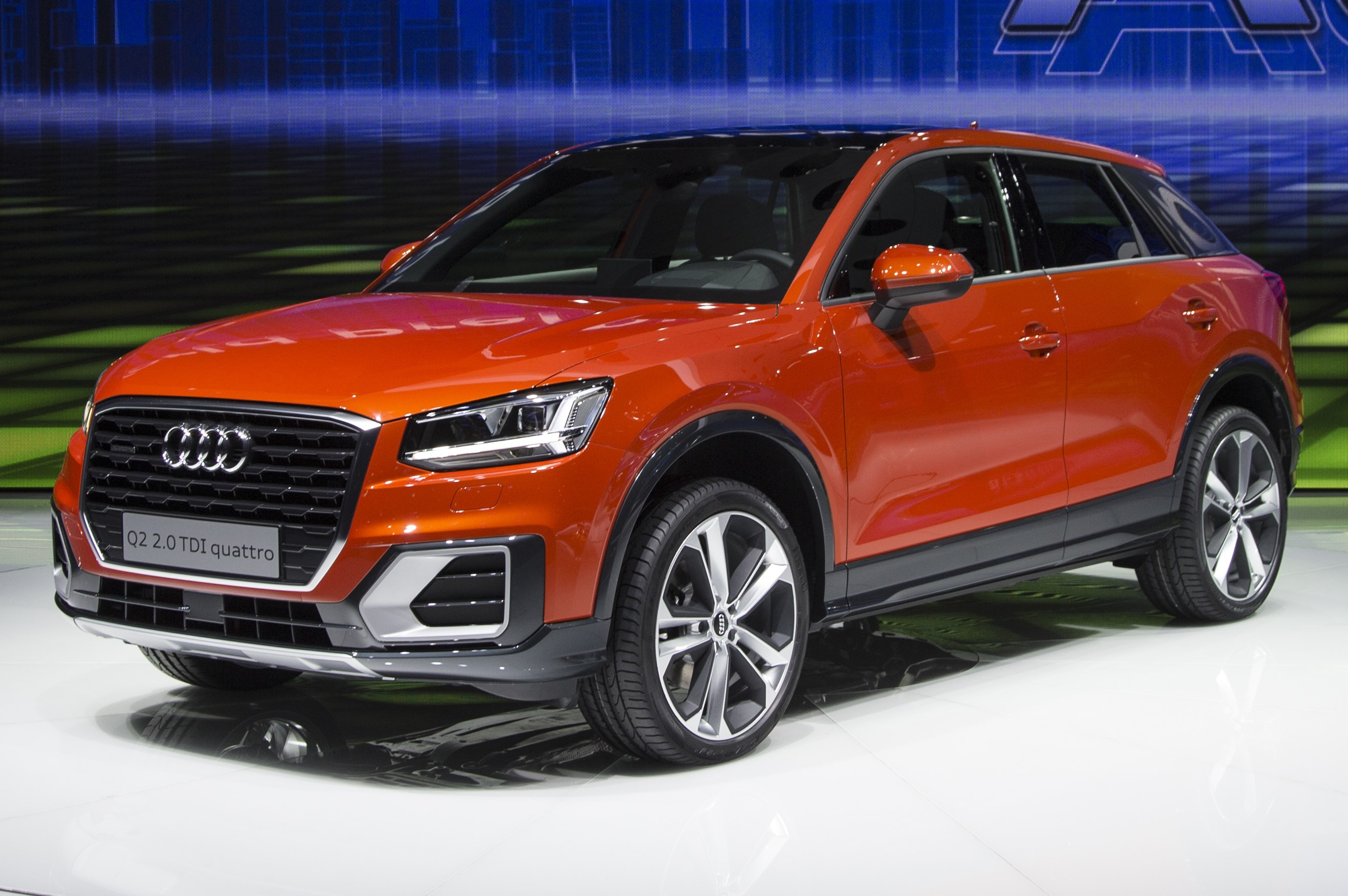
Q2 (Pre-facelift)

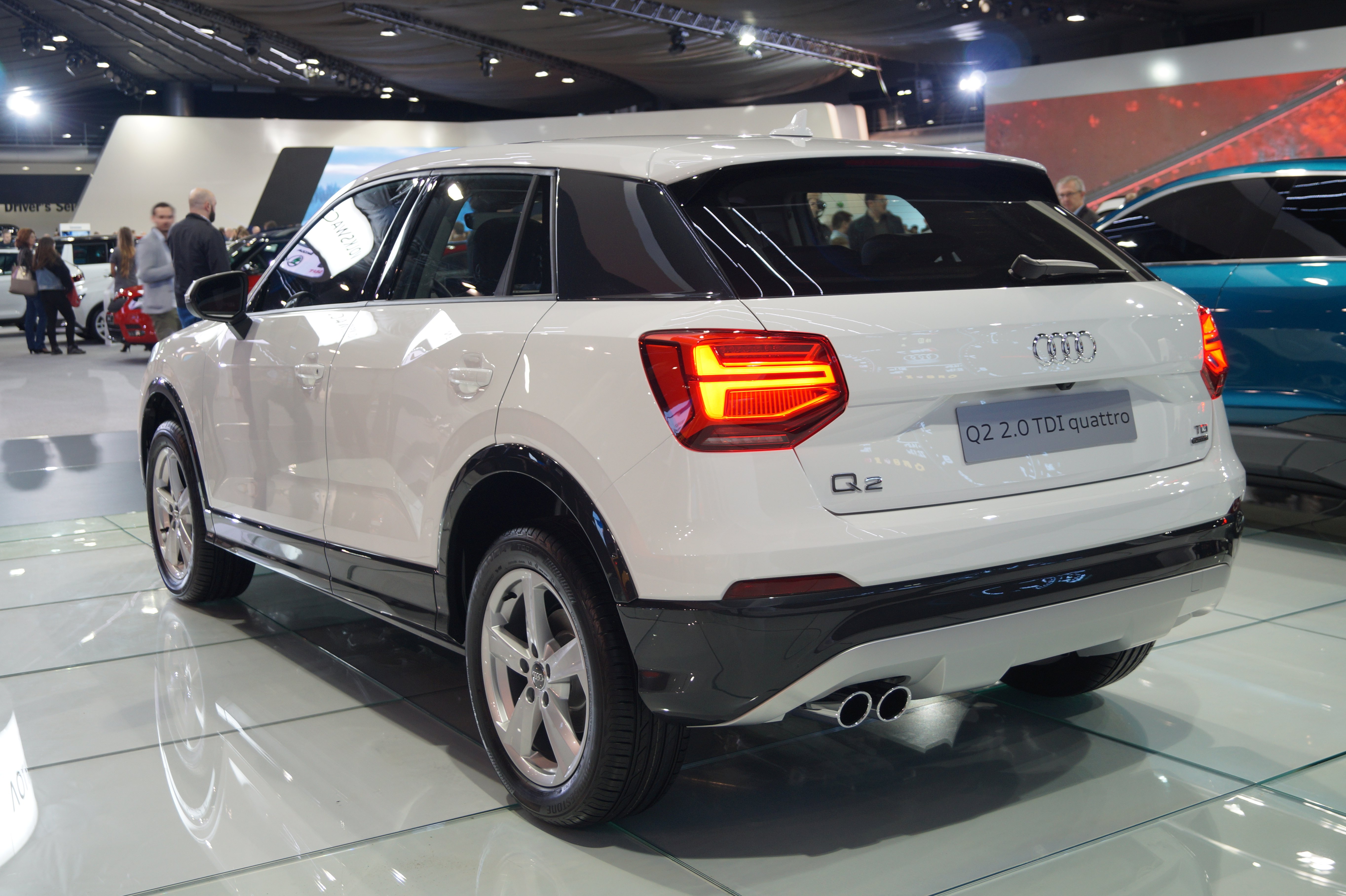
Q2 (Pre-facelift)

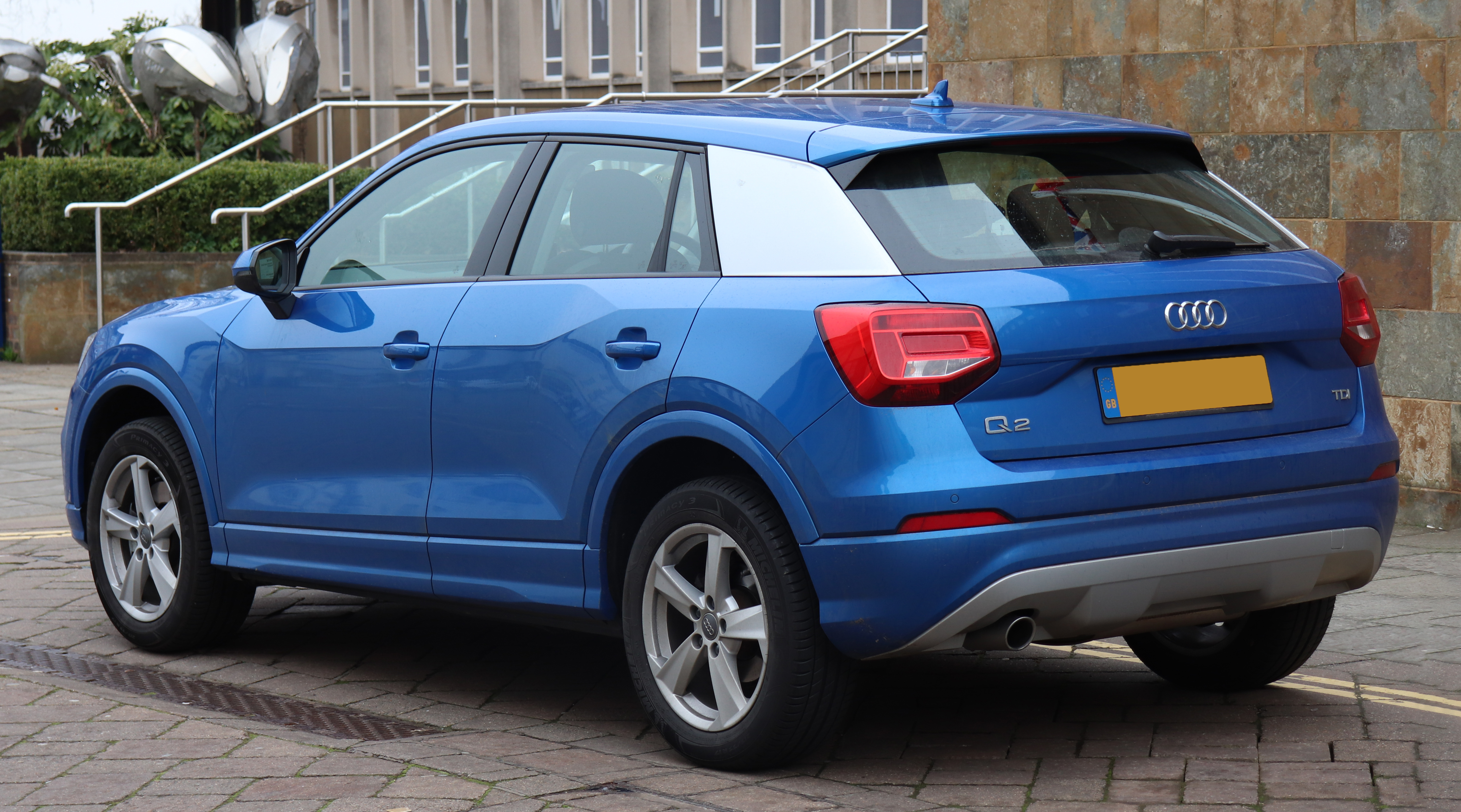
35TFSI Auto

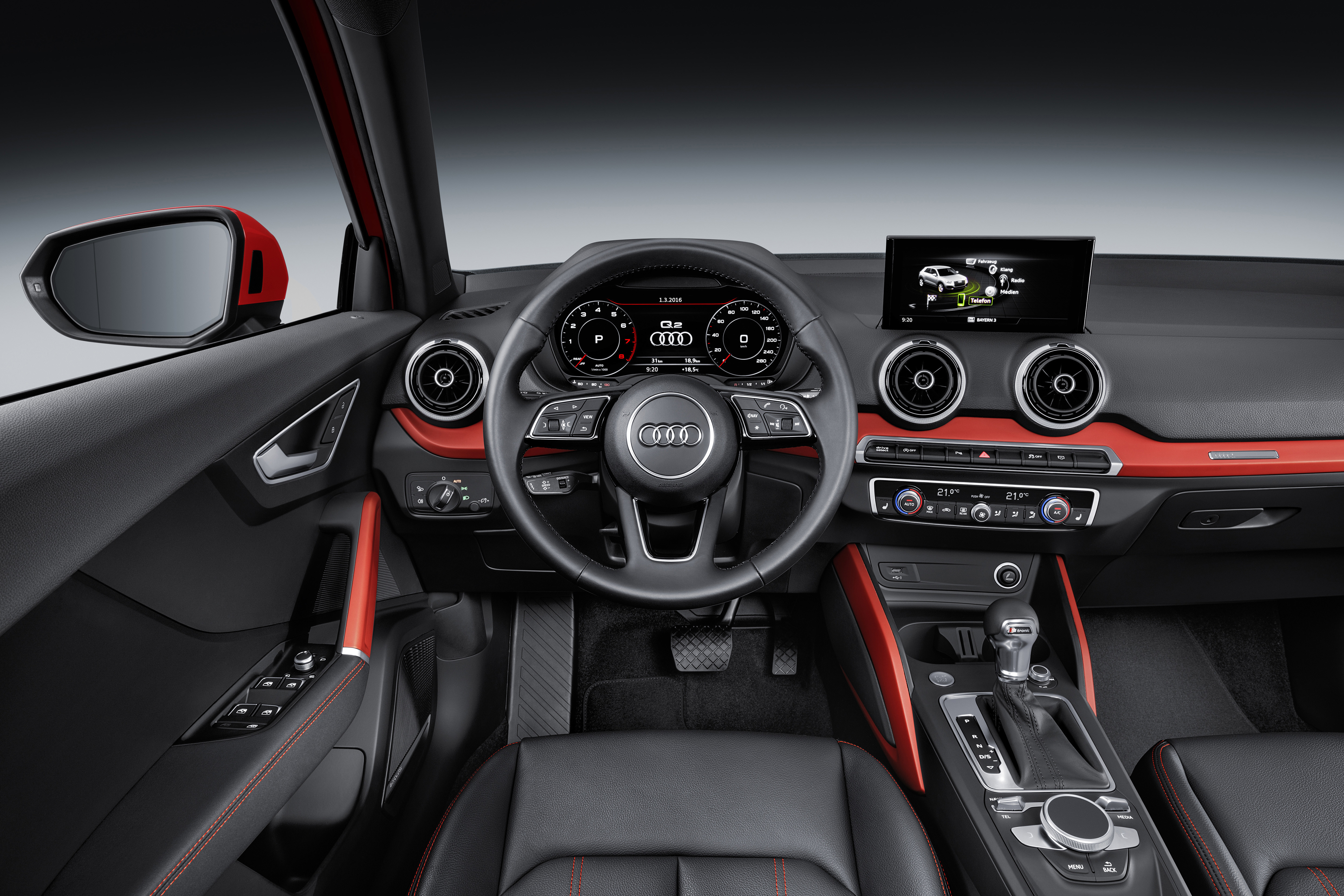
Interior

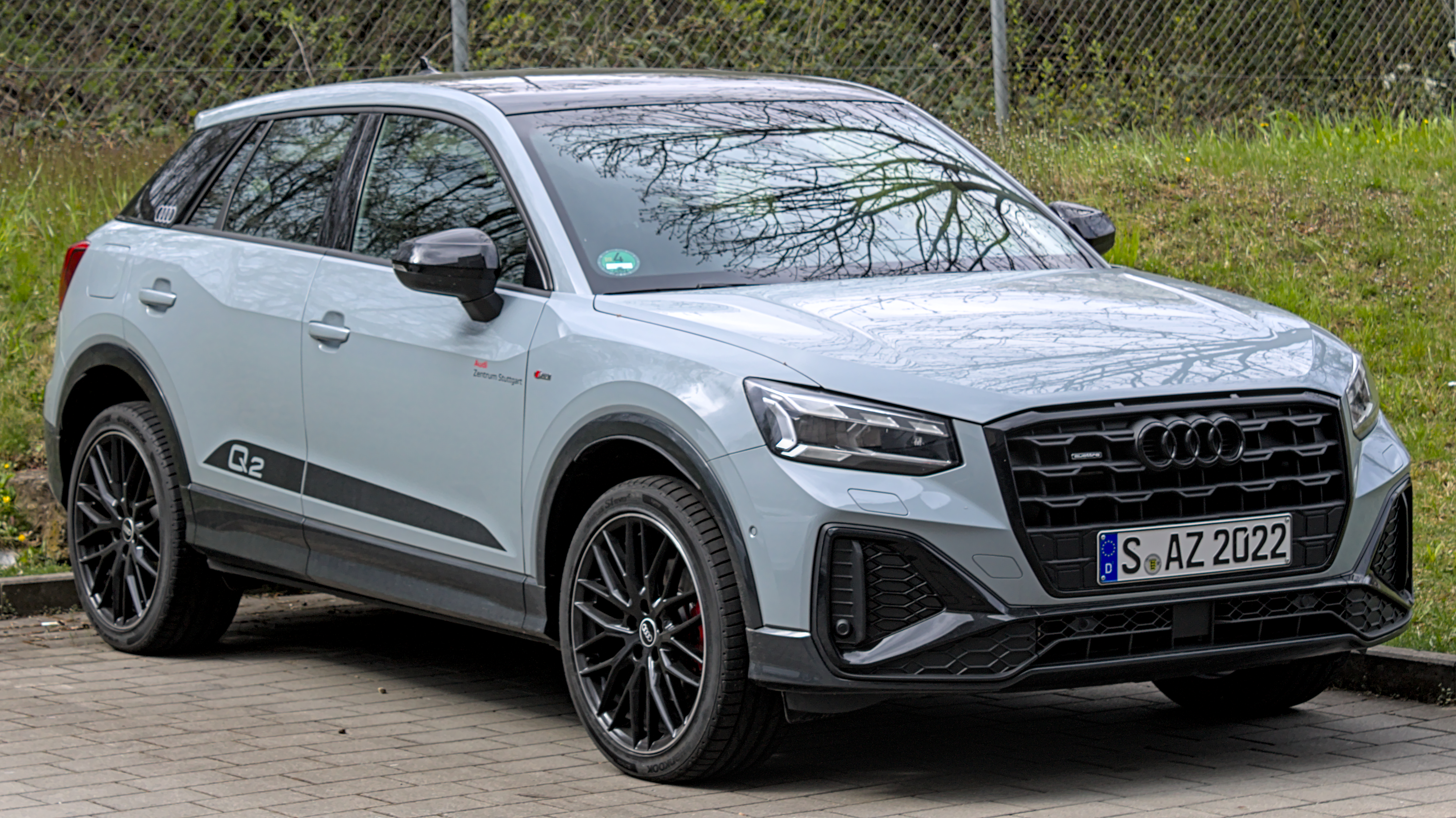
Q2 (Facelift)

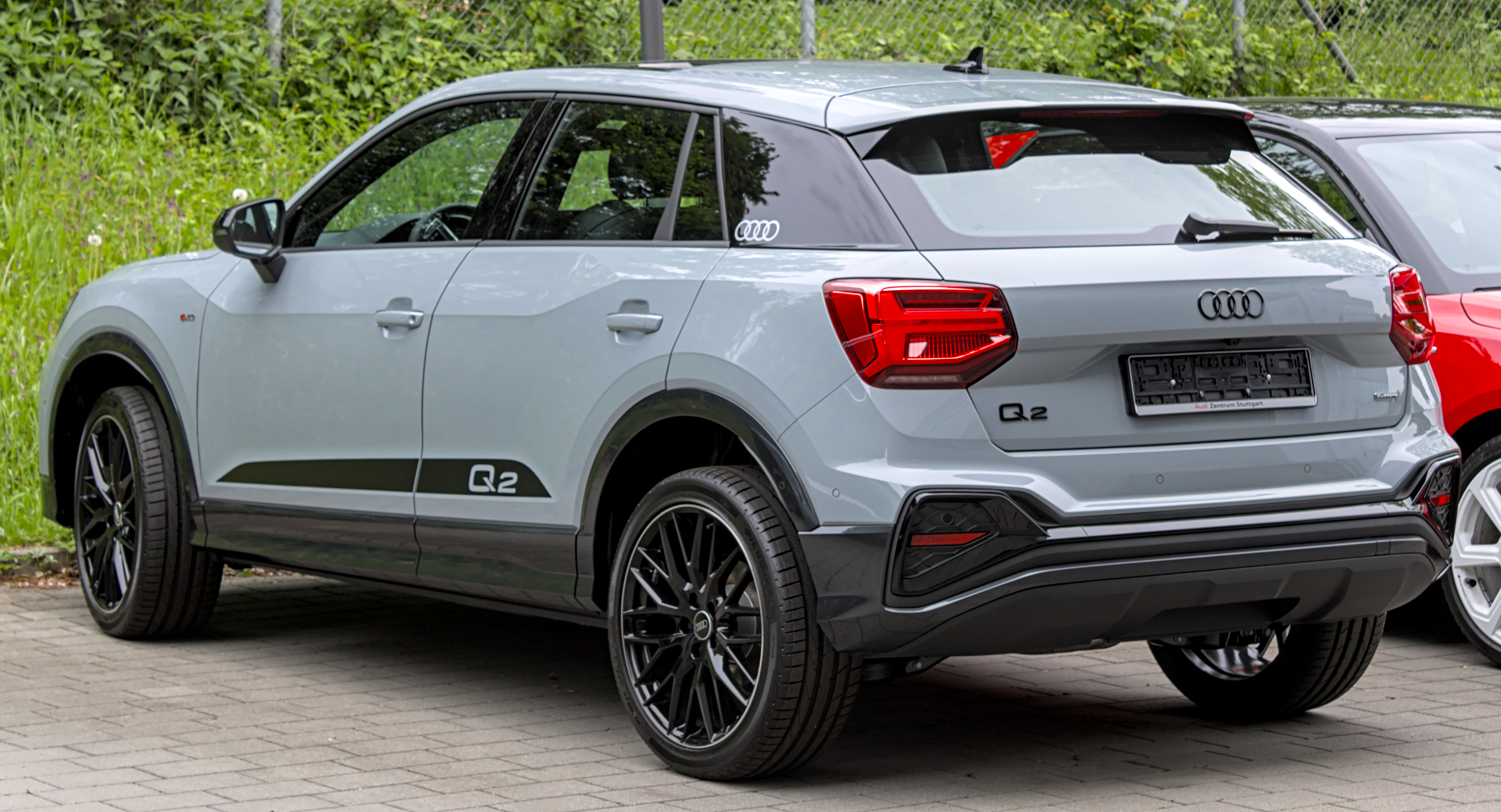
Q2 (Facelift)

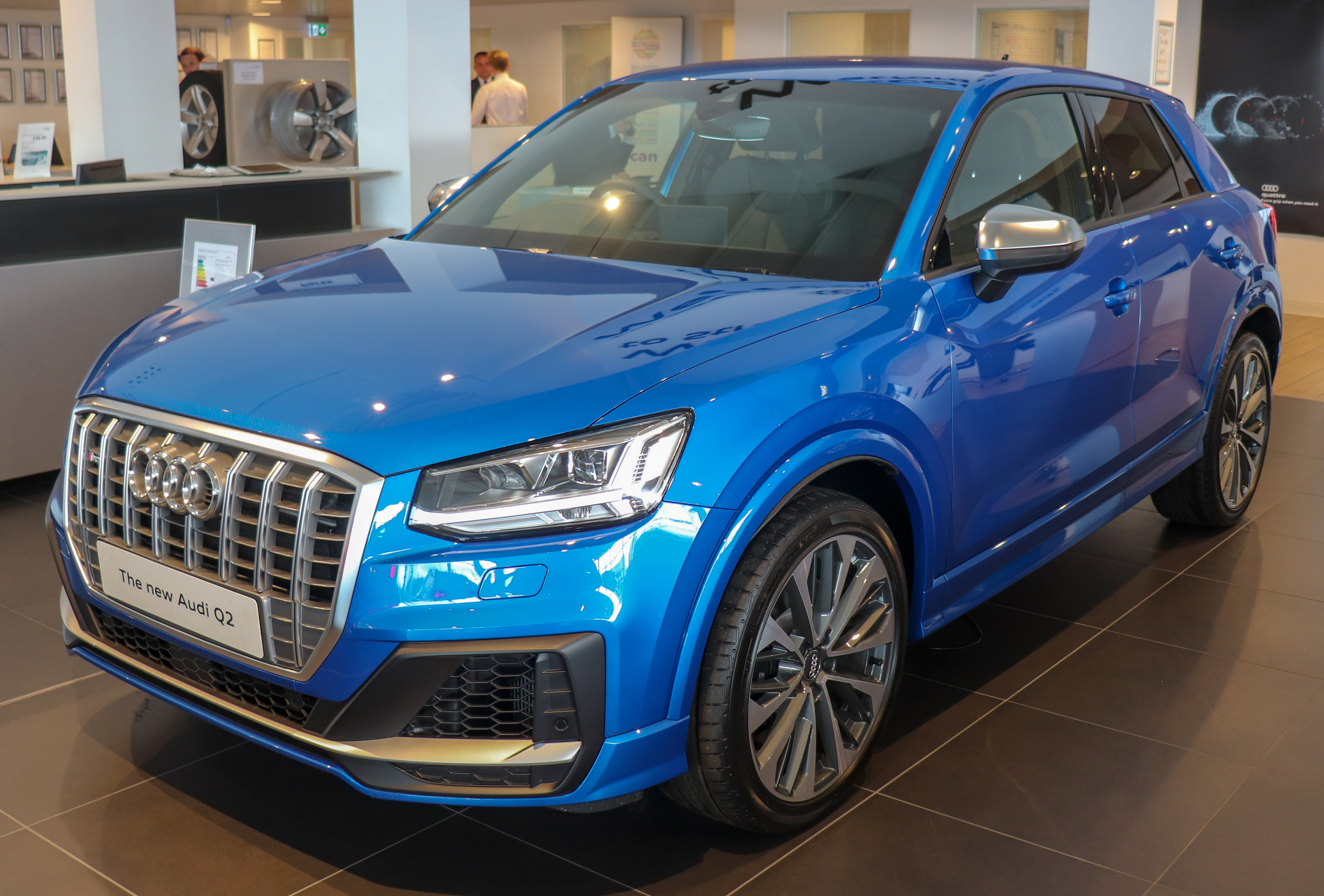
SQ2

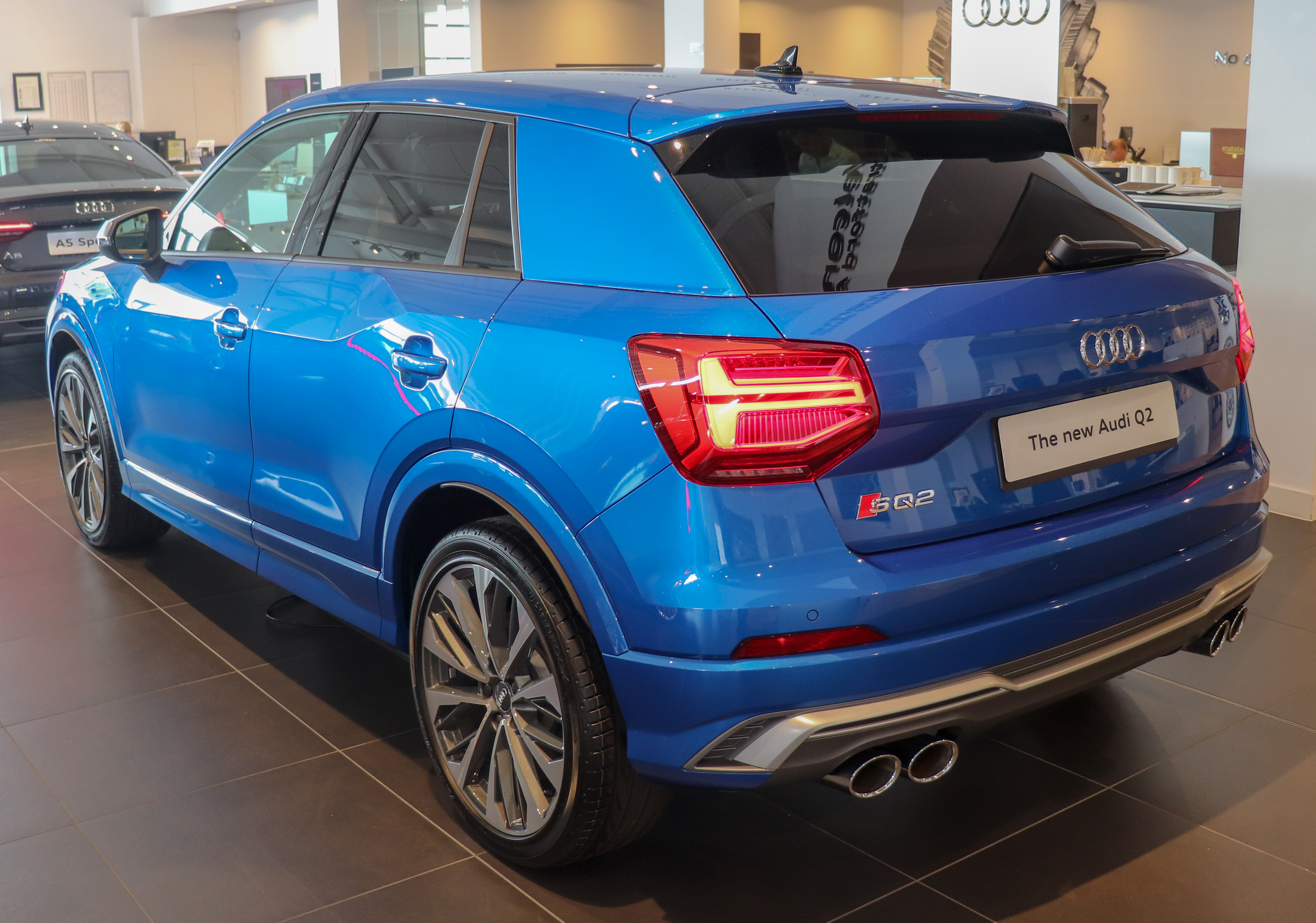
SQ2

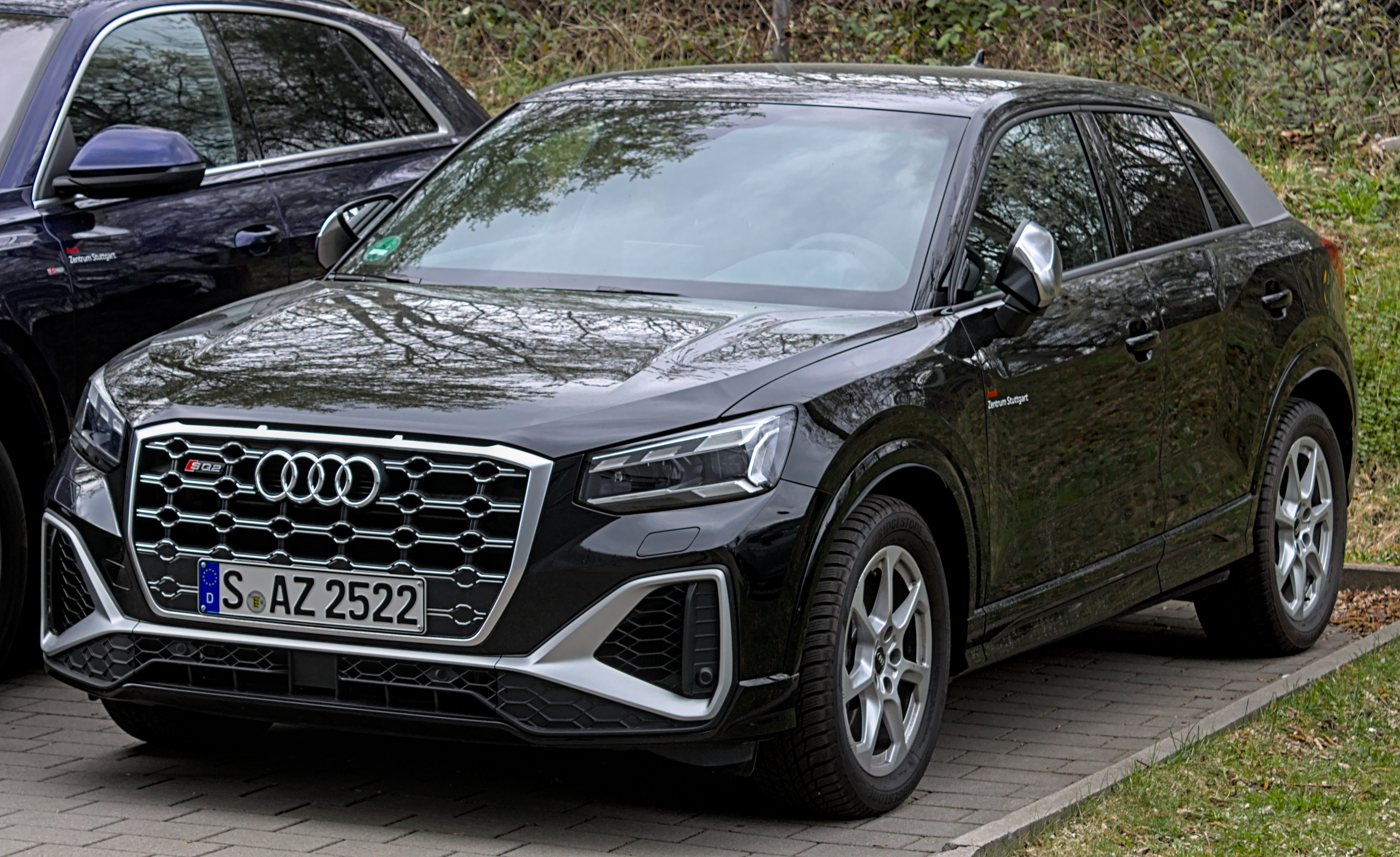
SQ2 (Facelift)

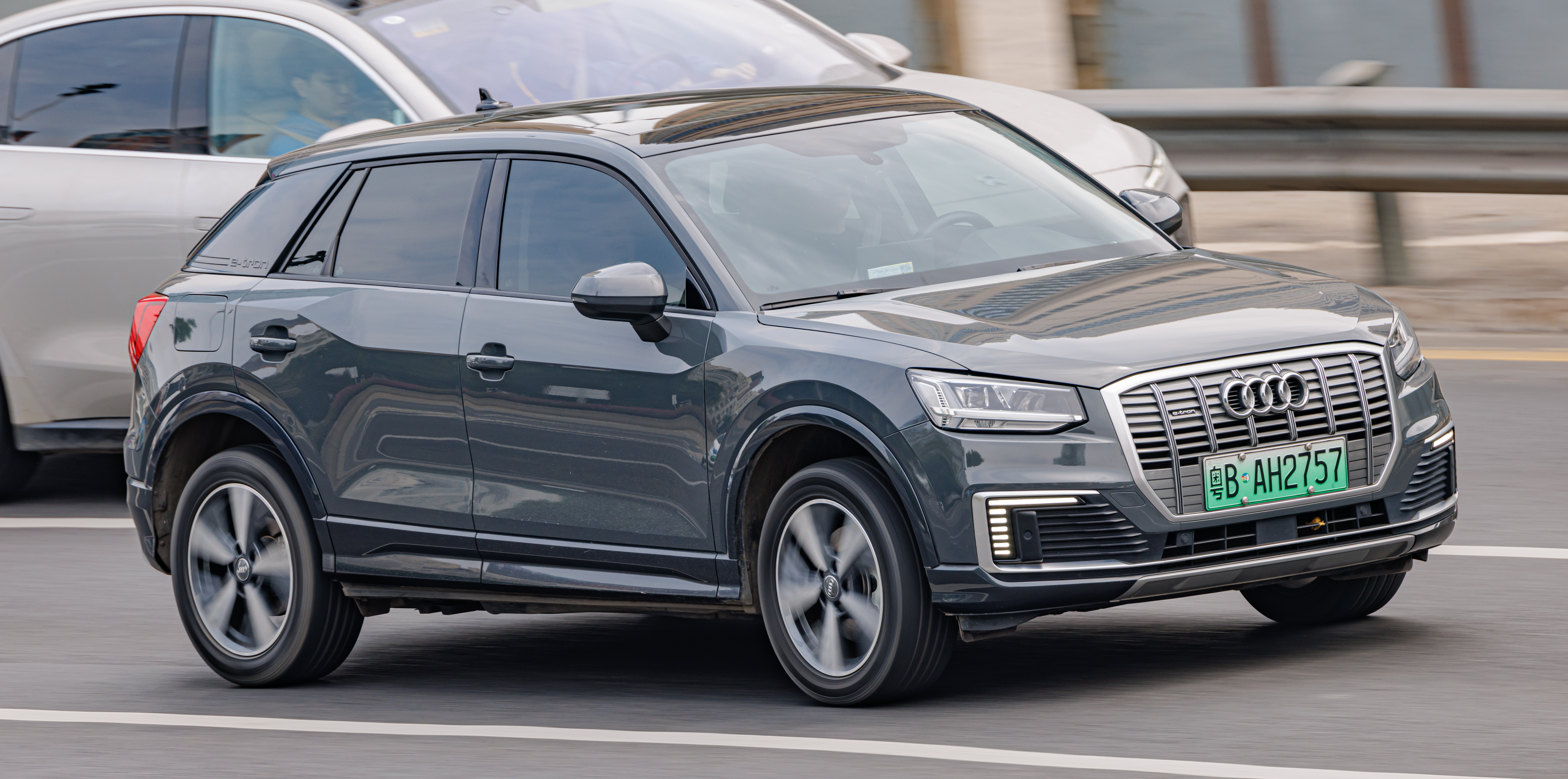
Q2L e-tron (China)

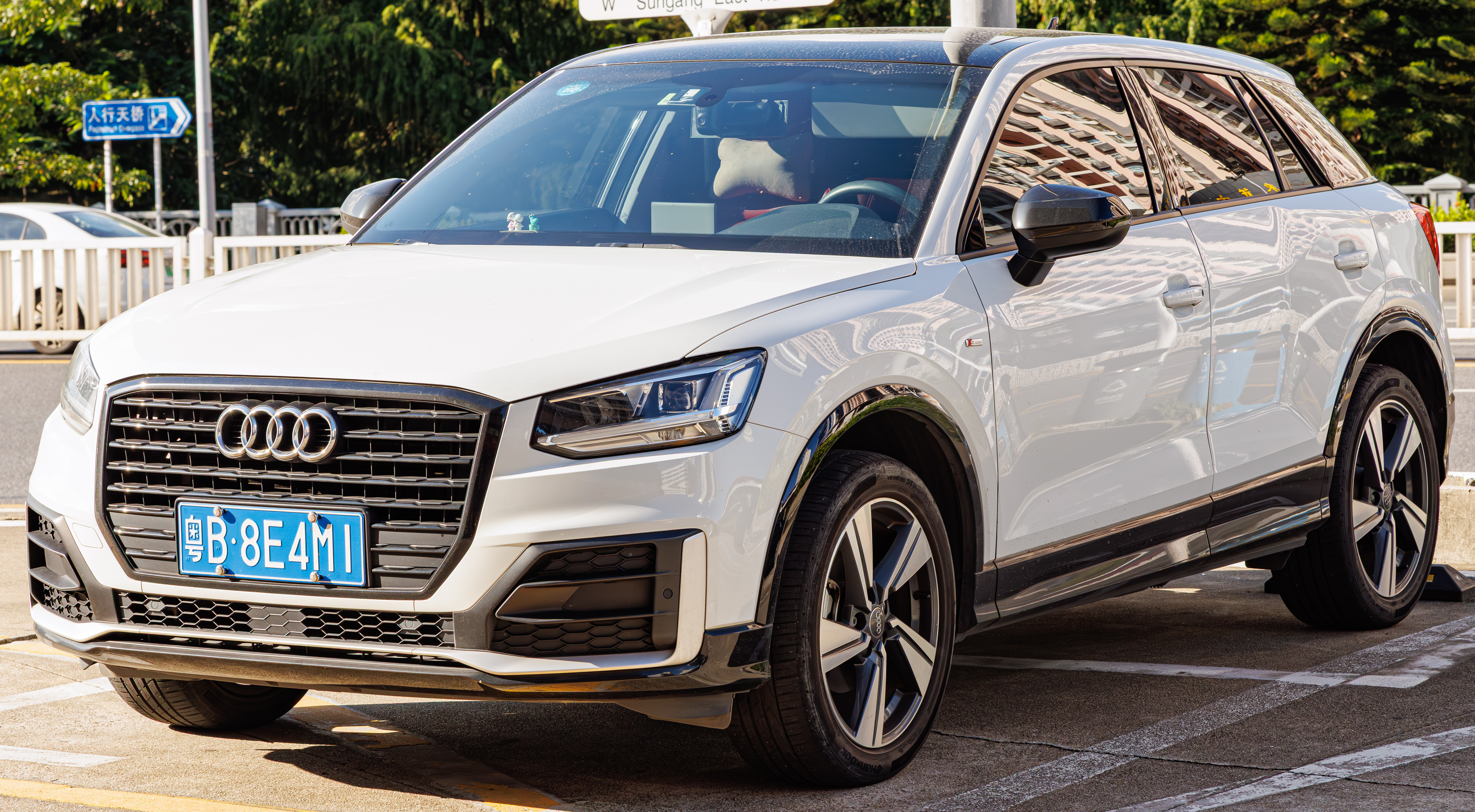
Q2L (China)

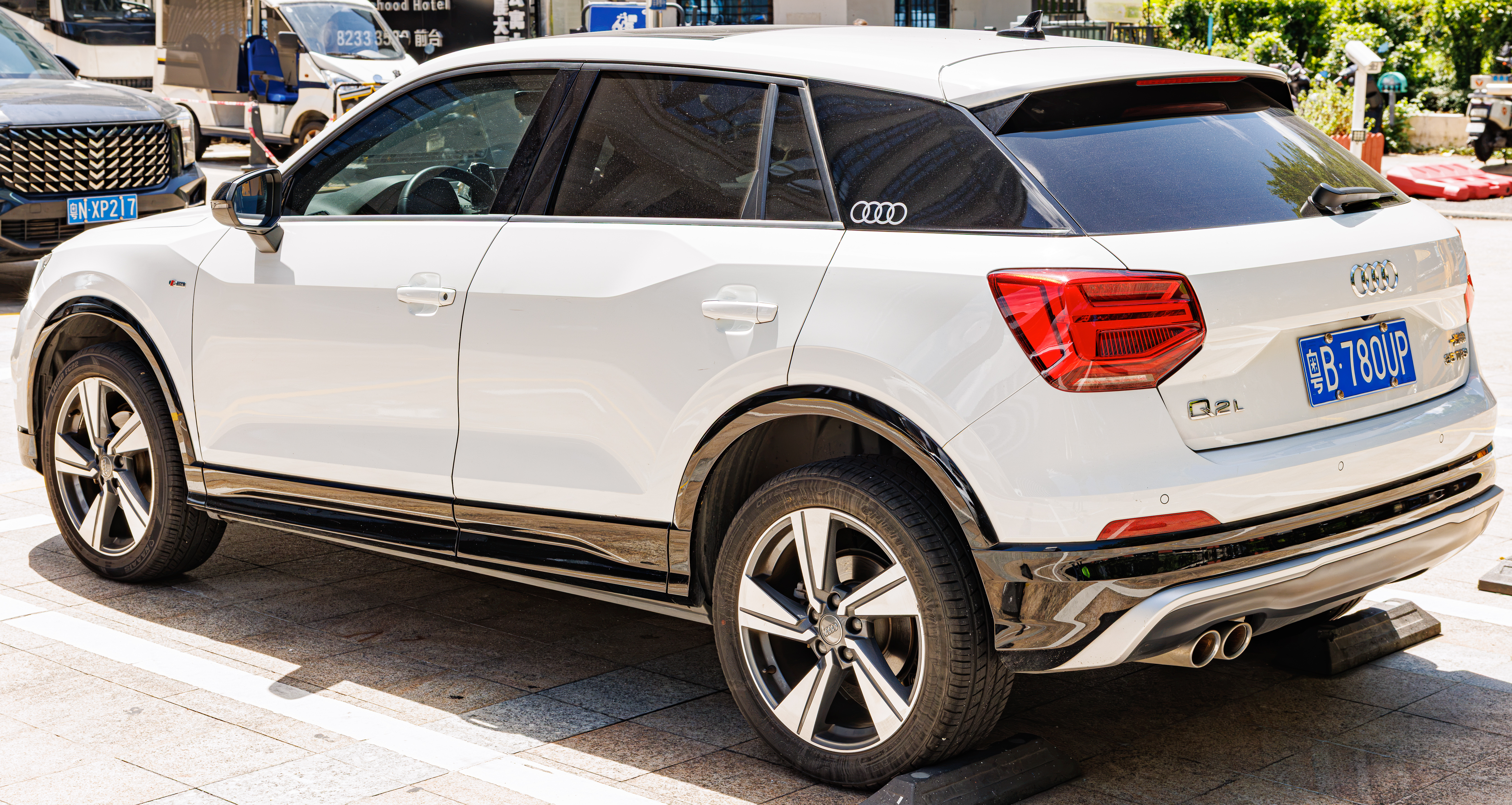
Q2L (China)

The Q2 subcompact SUV has multiple trim levels:

- SE, Sport
- S line
- Technik
- Edition #1
- Black edition

== Technical data ==
Petrol engines
Model	Years	Engine	Power	Torque	Drivetrain	Transmission	Curb wt.	Top speed	0–100 km/h (0–62 mph)	Fuel cons.	CO_{2} emission {g/km)	Emission std.
1.0 TFSI	2017–2026	999 cc I3 turbo	85 kW (114 hp; 116 PS) @ 5500 rpm	200 N⋅m (148 lbf⋅ft) @ 2000–3500 rpm	FWD	6-spd. manual (standard); 7-spd. S tronic DSG (optional)	1,205 kg (2,657 lb)	190 km/h (118 mph)	10.5-10.7 s	Unknown	Unknown	Euro 6
1.4 TFSI COD / 35 TFSI	2017–2026	1395 cc I4 turbo	110 kW (148 hp; 150 PS) @ 5000–6000 rpm	250 N⋅m (184 lbf⋅ft) @ 1500–3500 rpm	FWD (standard); AWD (quattro) (optional)	6-spd. manual (standard); 7-spd. S tronic DSG (optional); 8-spd. Tiptronic (optional)	Unknown	205–208 km/h (127–129 mph)	8.5-9.0 s	52.3 mpg_{‑imp} (5.40 L/100 km)	124	Euro 6
2.0 TFSI	2017–2026	1984 cc I4 turbo	140 kW (188 hp; 190 PS) @ 4200–6000 rpm	320 N⋅m (236 lbf⋅ft) @ 1450–4150 rpm	AWD (quattro)	7-spd. S tronic DSG	Unknown	219 km/h (136 mph)	6.8 s	Unknown	Unknown	Euro 6

Diesel engines
Model	Years	Engine	Power	Torque	Drivetrain	Transmission	Curb wt.	Top speed	0–100 km/h (0–62 mph)	Fuel cons.	CO_{2} emission {g/km)	Emission std.
1.6 TDI	2017–2026	1598 cc I4 turbo	85 kW (114 hp; 116 PS) @ 3250–4000 rpm	250 N⋅m (184 lbf⋅ft) @ 1500–3200 rpm	FWD	6-spd. manual (standard); 7-spd. S tronic DSG (optional)	Unknown	190 km/h (118 mph)	10.7 s	Unknown	Unknown	Euro 6
2.0 TDI	2017–2026	1968 cc I4 turbo	110 kW (148 hp; 150 PS) @ 3500–4000 rpm	340 N⋅m (251 lbf⋅ft) @ 1750–3000 rpm	FWD (standard); AWD (quattro) (optional)	6-spd. manual (standard); 7-spd. S tronic DSG (optional)	Unknown	202–208 km/h (126–129 mph)	8.5–8.7 s	64.2 mpg_{‑imp} (4.40 L/100 km)	114	Euro 6
2.0 TDI	2017–2026	1968 cc I4 turbo	140 kW (188 hp; 190 PS) @ 3500–4000 rpm	400 N⋅m (295 lbf⋅ft) @ 1900–3300 rpm	AWD (quattro)	7-spd. S tronic DSG	Unknown	218 km/h (135 mph)	7.0 s	Unknown	Unknown	Euro 6

Electric engines
Model	Years	Engine	Power	Torque	Drivetrain	Transmission	Curb wt.	Top speed	0–100 km/h (0–62 mph)
L 30 e-tron	2019–2025	Permanent magnet electric motor	100 kW (134 hp; 136 PS)	290 N⋅m (214 lbf⋅ft)	FWD	Single-speed fixed gear	Unknown	150 km/h (93 mph)	? s

== Safety ==
ANCAP test results Audi Q2 all variants excluding SQ2 (2017, aligned with Euro NCAP)
Test	Points	%
Overall:	5 /5 stars	
Adult occupant:	35.5	93%
Child occupant:	42.2	86%
Pedestrian:	29.5	70%
Safety assist:	7.3	60%

== Sales ==
Year	China	
Year	Q2L	e-tron
2018	9,762	—
2019	37,377	1,834
2020	46,973	3,448
2021	48,746	3,815
2022	29,035	1,919
2023	18,606	225
2024	8,073	54
2025	4,857	1
