= Oz (given name) =

Oz is the given name or nickname of:

Given name:

- Oz Almog (born 1956), Israeli–Austrian artist
- Oz Almog (sociologist) (born 1960), Israeli sociologist and historian
- Oz Blayzer (born 1992), Israeli basketball player
- Oz Ifrah (born 1982), Israeli football player
- Oz Pearlman (born 1982), American magician
- Oz Peretz (born 1994), Israeli footballer
- Oz Raly (born 1987), Israeli footballer

Nickname:

- Osman Oz Bengur (born 1949), American investment banker and politician
- Robert Oz Clarke (born 1949), British wine writer
- Richard Oz Griebel (born 1949), American banker, lawyer and politician
- Osborne Oz Scott (born 1949), American film, television and theatre director and television producer

== See also ==
- Öz Beg Khan (1282–1341), longest-reigning khan of the Golden Horde
- Ossie, a given name
- Ozzie, a given name
