= J20 =

J20 or J-20 may refer to:

== Vehicles ==
=== Aircraft ===
- Chengdu J-20, a Chinese stealth fighter
- Reggiane J 20, an Italian fighter in service with the Swedish Air Force
- Soko J-20 Kraguj, a Yugoslavian light attack aircraft

=== Automobiles ===
- Jeep J20, an American pickup truck
- Toyota Land Cruiser (J20), a Japanese off-road vehicle

=== Locomotives ===
- LNER Class J20, a British steam locomotive class

=== Ships ===
- HSwMS Östergötland (J20), an Östergötland-class destroyer of the Swedish Navy
- INS Nirupak (J20), a Sandhayak-class survey ship of the Indian Navy

== Other uses ==
- J20 Nationell, a Swedish junior hockey league
- Acute bronchitis
- County Route J20 (California)
- DisruptJ20, founded to protest the inauguration of Donald Trump in January 2017
- Elongated pentagonal cupola, a Johnson solid (J_{20})
- January 20, 2005 counter-inaugural protest, held in Washington, D.C. and other American cities
- Nissan J20, an automobile engine

== See also ==
- J_{2}O, with a letter "O" instead of a zero
