= N2O (disambiguation) =

N_{2}O is the chemical formula for Nitrous oxide.

N_{2}O or N2O may also refer to:

- N2O Records, a music label
- N_{2}O (video game), a video game

== See also ==
- N20 (disambiguation) (N twenty)
