= L20 =

L20, L-20 or L.20 may refer to:

== Vehicles ==
Aircraft

- Daimler L20, a German light aircraft
- de Havilland Canada L-20 Beaver, a Canadian utility aircraft
- Zeppelin LZ 59, an airship of the Imperial German Navy
- L-20, a United States Navy L-class blimp

Automobiles

- Scania-Vabis L20, a Swedish truck
- Severin L20, an American automobile
- Suzulight Carry (L20), a Japanese kei truck
- Toyota Tercel (L20), a Japanese subcompact car

Ships

- HMS L20, a submarine of the Royal Navy
- HMS Garth (L20), a destroyer of the Royal Navy
- INS Magar (L20), an amphibious warfare vessel of the Indian Navy
- Soviet submarine L-20, a Leninets-class submarine

== Proteins ==
- Mitochondrial ribosomal protein L20
- Ribosomal protein L20 leader

== Other uses ==
- L2O, a 3 Michelin star restaurant which closed in 2014
- Lectionary 20, a Greek manuscript of the New Testament, dated 1047
- Nikon Coolpix L20, a digital camera
- Nissan L20 engine, an automobile engine

== See also ==
- L2O, with a letter "O" instead of a zero
