= 2Q =

2Q or 2-Q may refer to:

- The second quarter of a calendar year (April, May, June) or fiscal year
- 2Q, IATA code for Air Cargo Carriers
- F3D-2Q, a model of Douglas F3D Skyknight
- WV-2Q, a model of Lockheed EC-121 Warning Star
- 2q, an arm of Chromosome 2 (human)

== See also ==
- Q2 (disambiguation)
