= W12 =

W12 may refer to:

== Automobiles ==
- McCormick W-12, a farm tractor
- Mercedes-AMG F1 W12 E Performance, a Formula 1 car
- Volkswagen W12, a concept car
  - Volkswagen W-12, its engine

== Other uses ==
- Amangu language
- British NVC community W12, a woodland community in the British National Vegetation Classification system
- Cierva W.11 Air Horse, a British helicopter proposal
- Hansa-Brandenburg W.12, a fighter floatplane
- Icosidodecahedron
- London Buses route W12
- W12 engine, a twelve-cylinder engine
- Volkswagen Group W-12 engine
- W12 nuclear warhead, an American nuclear weapon design
- West 12, a shopping centre in London
- W12, a postcode district in London, England
