= Volkswagen W12 =

Series of concept cars

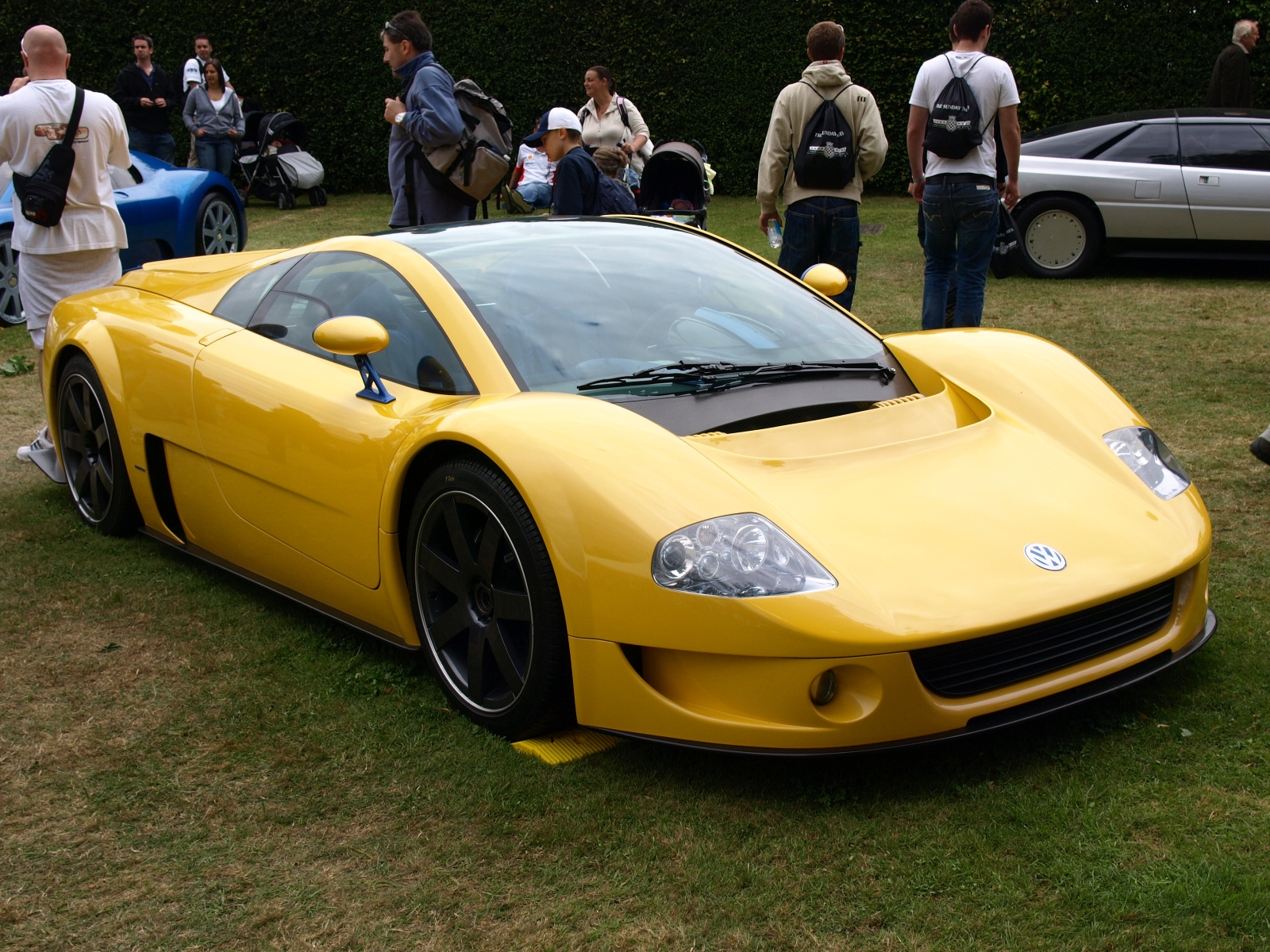
- The 1997 Volkswagen W12 Syncro at the 2008 Goodwood Festival of Speed.

Overview
- Manufacturer: Volkswagen
- Production: 1997–2001
- Designer: Giorgetto Giugiaro at Italdesign

Body and chassis
- Class: Sports car (S)
- Layout: Rear mid-engine, rear-wheel-drive (W12 Nardò & W12 Roadster); Longitudinal, mid-engine, four-wheel-drive (W12 Syncro)
- Doors: Scissor

Powertrain
- Engine: 5.6 L Volkswagen Group W12 (W12 Syncro & W12 Roadster); 6.0 L Volkswagen Group W12 (W12 Nardò)
- Transmission: 6-speed manual

Dimensions
- Wheelbase: 2,530 mm (99.6 in)
- Length: 4,400 mm (173.2 in)
- Width: 1,920 mm (75.6 in)
- Height: 1,100 mm (43.3 in)

The Volkswagen W12 is a series of concept cars created by Volkswagen Passenger Cars from 1997 to 2001.

Over the course of the W12 supercar project's development, a total of five prototypes were constructed by Italdesign. These comprised the W12 Syncro Coupé (1997), a yellow all-wheel-drive concept car; the W12 Roadster (1998), a red rear-wheel-drive open-top variant; two examples of the W12 Nardò Coupé, the final 600 hp evolution of the design, one of which remains in Italdesign's collection while the other is a road-legal prototype later restored by SPS Performance and held in private ownership; and the W12 Nardò Record Car, an orange high-speed test vehicle developed for endurance trials. In 2002, the latter set a 24-hour endurance speed record at the Nardò Ring.

== Initial conception ==
At the request of then Volkswagen Group CEO Ferdinand Piech, Giorgetto Giugiaro and his Italdesign team was tasked to design a Volkswagen sports car, with instructions that it had to accommodate a 12-cylinder engine in a W configuration, be mid-engined, and also be able to be configured with Volkswagen's Syncro all-wheel drive system.

Another reason for its conception was to prove to the world that Volkswagen Group can build a supercar and can build a large and reliable engine for its flagship car models such as the Audi A8, Volkswagen Phaeton, and its sport utility vehicle, the Volkswagen Touareg. In fact, the W12 engine featured in the W12 Nardò concept is closely related to the engines found in the Bentley Continental GT and Bentley Flying Spur.

== The concepts ==
=== W12 Syncro (1997) ===
In 1997, at the Tokyo Motor Show, Volkswagen debuted their first sports car concept, a bright yellow W12 Syncro (also known as the W12 Syncro Coupé) with a 5.6-litre W12 engine producing 309 kW (420 PS; 414 bhp) with Syncro four-wheel drive. This, and the W12 concepts after it, were all designed by the Italdesign firm in Italy. The W12 Syncro had the following specifications:

- Front track: 1,620 mm (63.8 in)
- Rear track: 1,600 mm (63.0 in)
- Front overhang: 1,000 mm (39.4 in)
- Rear overhang: 870 mm (34.3 in)
- Engine position: mid longitudinal
- Layout: four-wheel drive
- Engine: 5,600 cubic centimetres (341.7 cu in) W12
- Rated power: 309 kilowatts (420 PS; 414 bhp)

=== W12 Roadster (1998) ===
It is an open topped version of W12 Syncro with red body colour, rear-wheel drive.

The vehicle was unveiled at the 1998 Geneva Auto Show. It had the following specifications:

- Front track: 1,634 mm (64.3 in)
- Rear track: 1,652 mm (65.0 in)
- Front overhang: 990 mm (39.0 in)
- Rear overhang: 880 mm (34.6 in)
- Engine position: mid longitudinal
- Layout: rear-wheel drive
- Engine: 5,600 cubic centimetres (341.7 cu in) W12
- Rated power: 309 kilowatts (420 PS; 414 bhp)

=== W12 Nardò (2001) ===
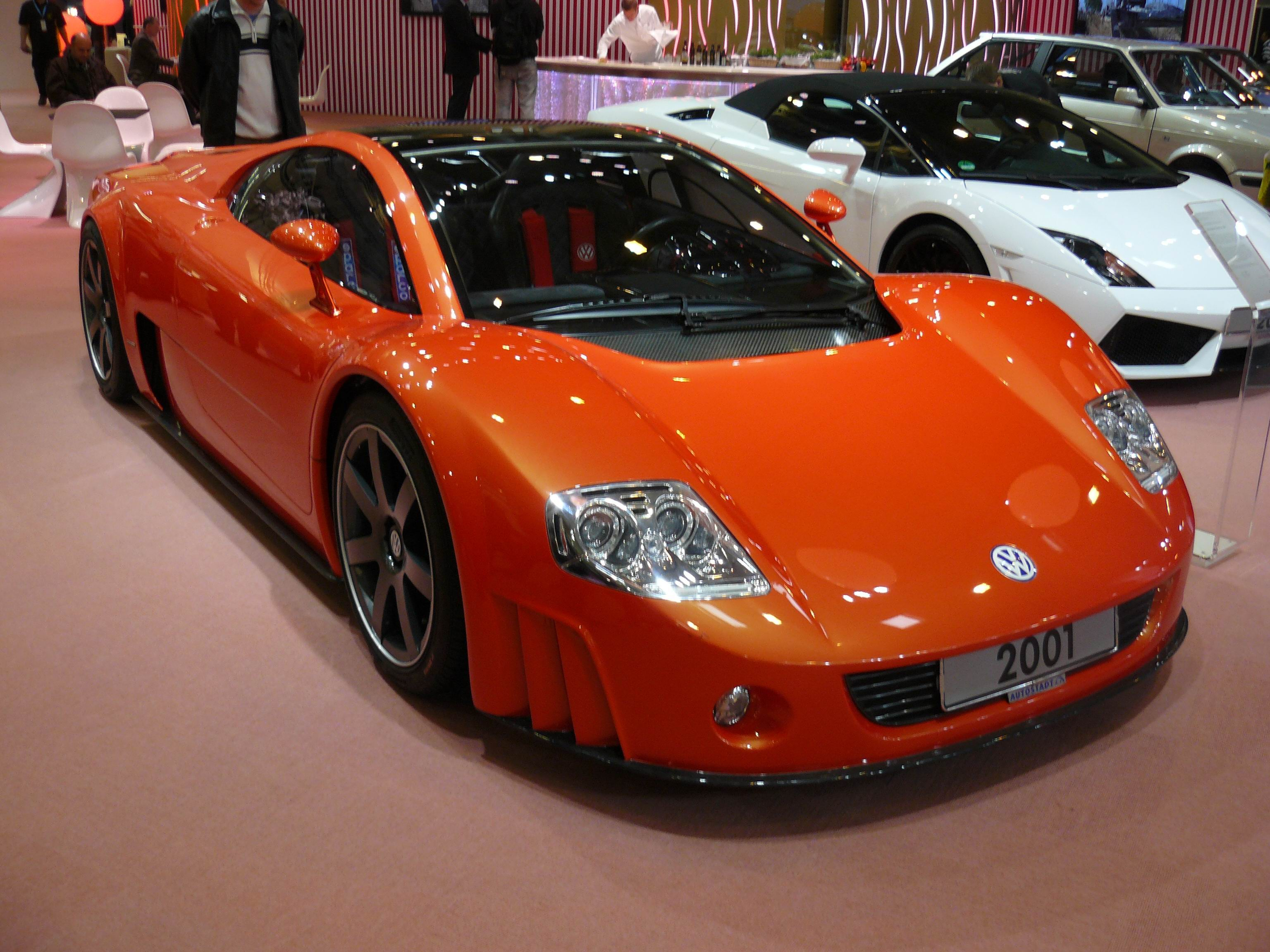
VW W12 Nardò 2001 (front quarter).

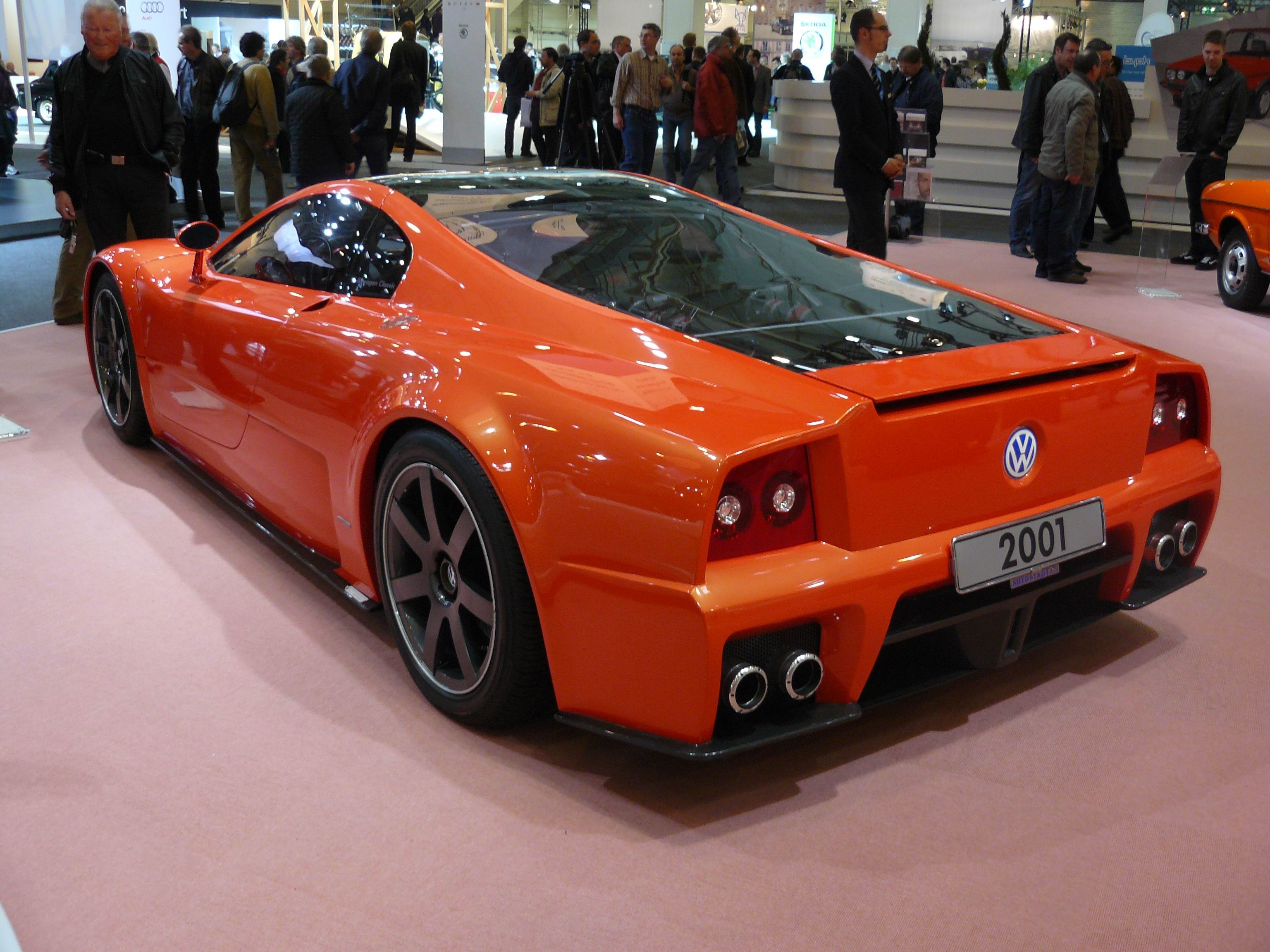
VW W12 Nardò 2001 (rear quarter).

In 2001, at the Tokyo Motor Show, Volkswagen Group released their most powerful W12 sports car concept yet, in bright orange (then also known as the W12 Nardò, referring to the Nardò Ring vehicle test track near the Italian city of Nardò). The engine was rated at 441 kW (600 PS; 591 bhp) and 621 N⋅m (458 lbf⋅ft) of torque; it could accelerate from a standstill to 100 km/h (62 mph) in about 3.5 seconds, and had a top speed of 357 km/h (221.8 mph), weighing 1,200 kg (2,646 lb).

It was originally unveiled as the 2001 Tokyo Motor Show concept car and was subsequently modified into the unpainted carbon-fiber "Record Car" to perform the high-speed runs at the Nardò Ring. After breaking the records, VW restored its iconic orange paint job and body panels for museum exhibition.

== Records ==
On 23 February 2002, a Volkswagen W12 coupé took the world record for all speed classes over 24 hours over the Nardò Ring at Lecce, covering a distance of 7,740.576 kilometres (4,809.8 mi) at an average speed of 322.891 km/h (200.6 mph). It is still valid as of August 2025.
