= W12 engine =

Piston engine with 12 cylinders in W configuration

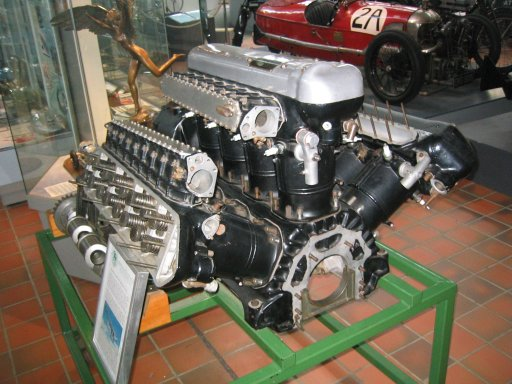
Napier Lion aircraft engine

A W12 engine is a twelve-cylinder piston engine in which either three banks of four cylinders, or four banks of three cylinders are arranged in a W configuration around a common crankshaft.

W12 engines with three banks of four cylinders were used in several aircraft engines from 1917 until the 1930s. A three-bank design was also used for an unsuccessful W12 engine that was intended to compete in Formula One in 1990.

W12 engines are less common than V12 engines and only a handful of automobile manufacturers use them. The WR12 engine was produced by the Volkswagen Group between 2001 and 2024. This four-bank engine – based on two VR6 engines with a common crankshaft – has been used only in flagship high performance car models produced by the Volkswagen Group and by Spyker.

== Aircraft engines ==
The Napier Lion was a three-bank design (also called the "broad arrow" design) W12 engine produced in the United Kingdom from 1917 to the late 1930s. It had a capacity of 24 litres (1,465 cu in) and produced 336–671 kW (450–900 hp). In addition to its use in various military and racing airplanes, the Lion was employed in land speed record cars such as the Napier-Railton and the Napier-Campbell Blue Bird, and racing boats such as the Miss Britain III.

During the 1920s, the Farman 12We aircraft engine was produced in France. The 12We produced 500 hp (373 kW) and was one of the company's best-selling engines in the 1920s.

The Lorraine 12E Courlis is another W12 aircraft engine that was produced in France during the 1920s and 1930s.

== Motor racing engines ==
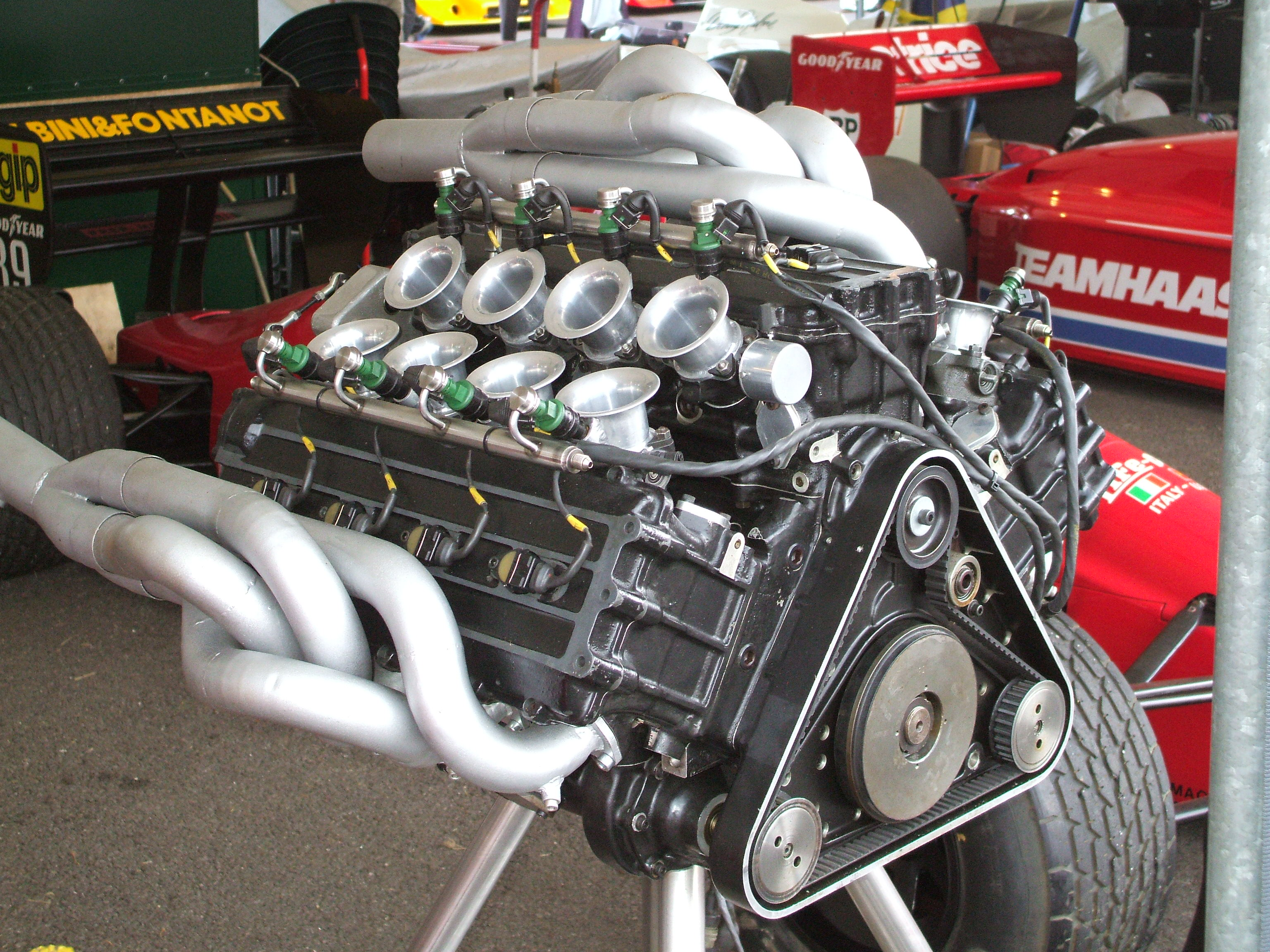
Life Racing Engines F35 Formula One engine

For the 1990 Formula One season, the Italian team Life Racing Engines built a three-bank W12 engine with a displacement of 3.5 L (214 cu in). The Life Racing Engine F35 used a central master connecting rod with a slave rod locating onto each side of the master rod rather than directly onto the crank pin. This meant that there was no offset between the cylinders, which reduced the length of the crankpins. The engine was used in rounds 1 to 12 of the 1990 season, however it was unreliable and lacking in power, and the car failed to pre-qualify for any races. The W12 engine was replaced by a Judd V8 engine after round 12.

== Road car engines ==
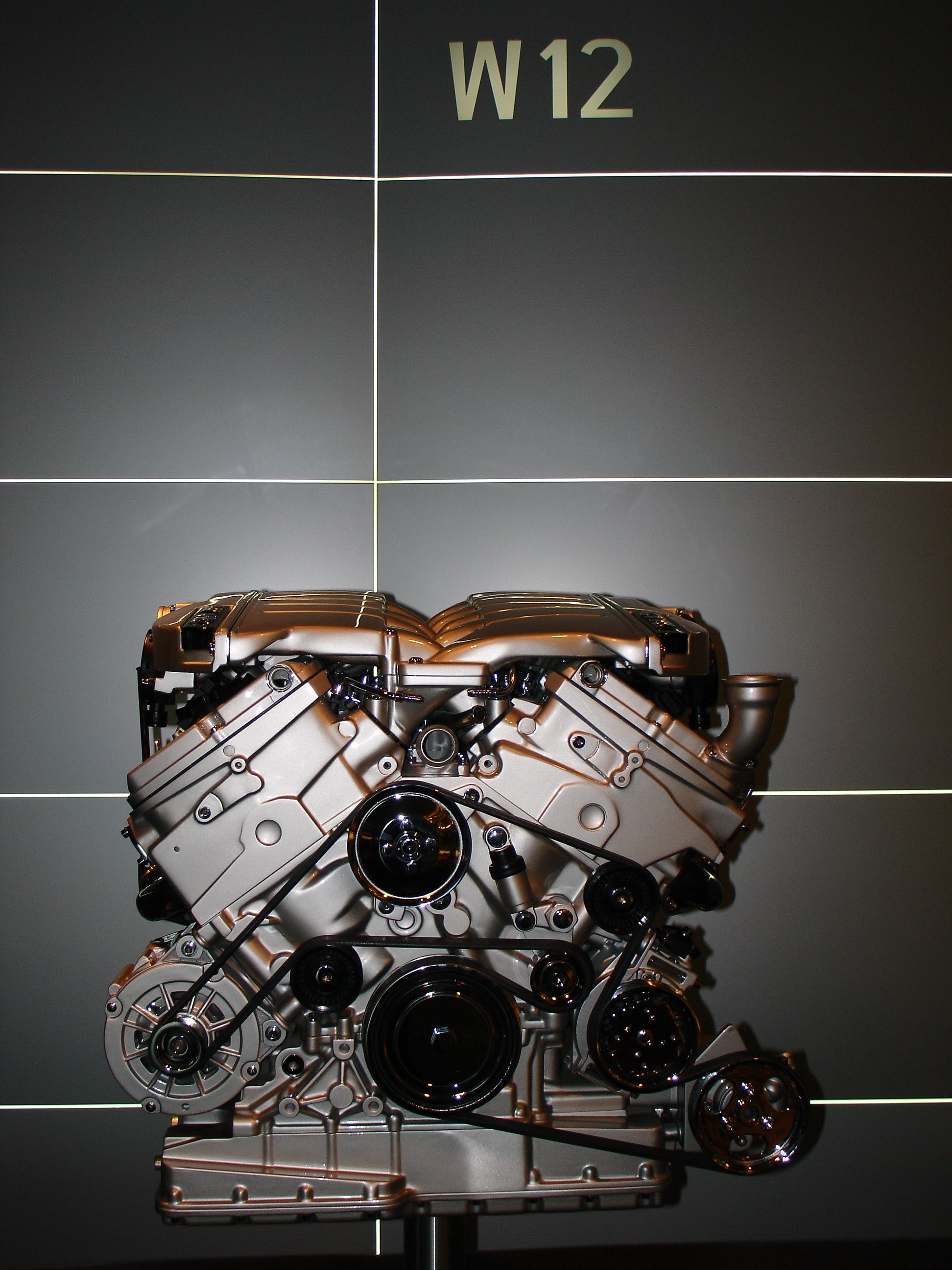
Volkswagen's 6.0 WR12 48v engine

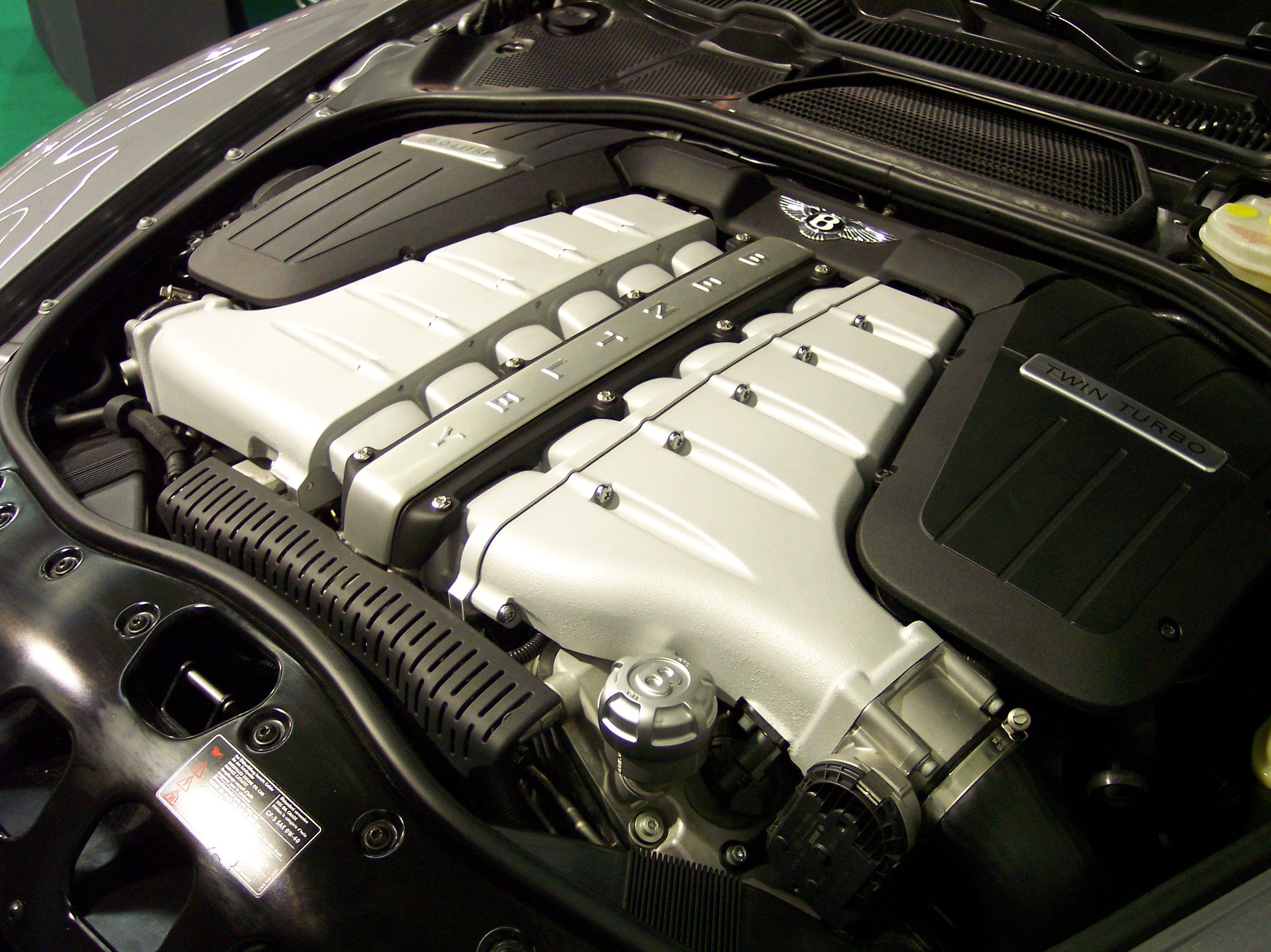
Bentley's 6.0 twin-turbocharged W12 engine

The only mass-production W12 engine is the Volkswagen 6.0 WR12 48v, a four-bank design that was first released in 2001. The engine is constructed by mating two narrow-angle 15° VR6 engines at an inclined angle of 72°. The narrow angle of each set of cylinders allows just two overhead camshafts to drive each pair of banks, so the WR12 engine has both a crankshaft design, and the same number of camshafts as the V-12 engine. Where the VR6 is a staggered-bank straight 6, the WR12 in turn is a staggered-bank V-12 in terms of engineering design. As a consequence, it cannot be considered a true three-block W-engine, in the manner of the Life F-1 engine, or the Napier-Railton.

Within Volkswagen, the engine is designated a WR engine, terminology in derivation of its use of the VR6 geometry for each bank. Early Volkswagen and Audi cars using this engine were badged with a W with an inset V, to emphasise the engine design. Later badging (after approximately 2001) of cars with this engine did not make use of that particular badging, leading to confusion of the staggered-bank V-12 with a true W engine in the public mind.

The naturally aspirated variant of the WR12 engine has been used in the brands of Audi and Volkswagen. In 2003, a twin-turbocharged version of the WR12 engine was produced to be used exclusively in the Bentley Continental GT and Bentley Flying Spur.

The WR12 engine has a very compact design for a 12-cylinder engine, with the overall size of the 6.0 L (366 cu in) engine being smaller than that of Volkswagen's contemporary 4.2 L (256 cu in) V8 engine.

The first application of the Volkswagen WR12 was the 2001 Volkswagen W12 Nardò, a mid-engined concept car that set the 24‑hour world endurance record in 2001 with a distance of 7,085.7 kilometres (4,402.8 mi) and an average speed of 295 km/h (183 mph).

The first production car to use the WR12 engine was the 2001 Audi A8 (D2). The succeeding Audi A8 (D3) and Audi A8 (D4) also had the WR12 as an upgrade engine only for the long-wheelbase variant, the Audi A8L W12, which was last available in the 2018 model year. The Audi A8L W12 with its all-wheel drive was unique among its German contemporaries, as 12-cylinder rivals from BMW and Mercedes-Benz used V12 engines with rear-wheel drive.

Other cars to use the WR12 engine are the Bentley Continental GT (2003–2024), Bentley Flying Spur (2005–2024), Bentley Bentayga (2015–2024), Volkswagen Phaeton W12 (2004–2011) and the Volkswagen Touareg W12 (2005–10). The engine was also used in the 2006 Spyker C12 La Turbie and 2008 Spyker C12 Zagato low-volume sports cars.

In 2023, Bentley Motors announced that it will retire the W12 engine in April 2024, citing emissions targets and the brand's impending electrification. The last Volkswagen Group W12 engine was completed by Bentley Crewe in July 2024, marking the end of the engine's production.
