= Spyker C12 La Turbie =

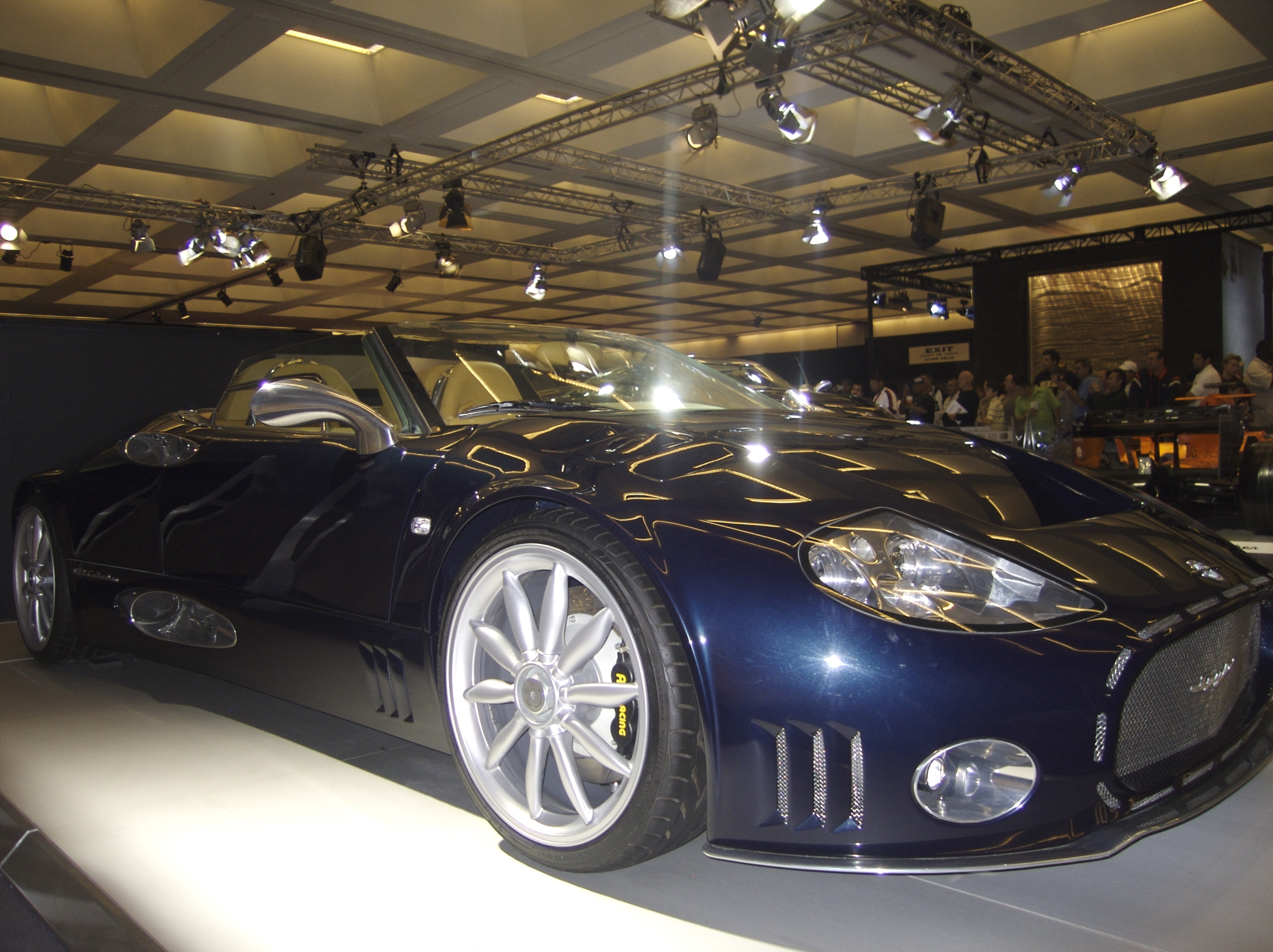

Overview
- Manufacturer: Spyker Cars
- Production: 2005; 1 built

Body and chassis
- Class: Sports car (S)
- Body style: 2-door convertible
- Layout: RMR layout
- Doors: Scissor

Powertrain
- Engine: VW Group 6.0 L W12

Dimensions
- Wheelbase: 2675 mm (105.3 in)
- Length: 4585 mm (180.5 in)
- Width: 1920 mm (75.6 in)
- Height: 1255 mm (49.4 in)
- Curb weight: 1400 kg (3086 lb)

The Spyker C12 La Turbie is a sports car produced by Dutch automaker Spyker Cars in 2005 and shown at the Geneva Motor Show. The company initially showed a silver C12 Spyder in December 2004, a project to install the W12 on a long-wheelbase C8 Double 12S chassis with a standard design. But already in the spring of 2005 they presented this model with its distinctive design La Turbie. The name refers to the Spyker C4's victory in the 1922 Mont de la Turbie hill climb race near Monte Carlo.

The LaTurbie was the first version of the C12 platform, being followed by the C12 Zagato one year later, which featured a unique Zagato designed body. Spyker originally planned to produce 25 LaTurbies, however, in October 2007 it was announced that Spyker had cancelled production of all C12 models, including the C12 LaTurbie and its sister model the C12 Zagato, before any cars were produced, in order to focus their resources on other models.

== Overview ==
The C12 LaTurbie was the first Spyker to run the 6.0 litre VW Group W12 dry sump aluminum engine, giving it a power output of 500 bhp (373 kW) and 600 N⋅m (443 lbf⋅ft) of torque. Top speed is claimed to be 325 km/h (202 mph), with acceleration from 0–100 km/h (0-62 mph) in 3.9 seconds. A manual six-speed gearbox was planned to be fitted with "an F1 style paddle shift under development". The car has two luggage compartments, with a leather Louis Vuitton luggage set available to order, specially designed to fit. Inside, gauges are designed by Swiss watchmaker Chronoswiss, which also produces limited-edition Spyker branded wristwatches. The original grey body colour was replaced with blue by 2006, and it appeared in the new colour in the 2007 film War (Filming date: spring 2006).

This is Spyker's third long wheelbase car, along with the C8 Double12 S and the C8 Double12 Spyder, which have V8 engines rather than W12s. The Double12's chassis was widened by 100mm to accommodate the W12 engine.

== Specification ==
- Price: $290,000 (£253,430)
- Power: 372.9 kW / 500.1 bhp
- Torque: 600 N⋅m (443 lbf⋅ft)
- 0–60 mph (0–97 km/h): 3.9 seconds
- Top speed: 325 km/h (202 mph)
- Double twin exhausts
- ABS
- 19" AerobladeT wheels (designed in-house by Spyker)
- Rear wheel drive with Drexler limited slip differential
- Lightweight aluminum space frame with integrated roll cage
