= Bentley Flying Spur (2005) =

British luxury motor vehicle

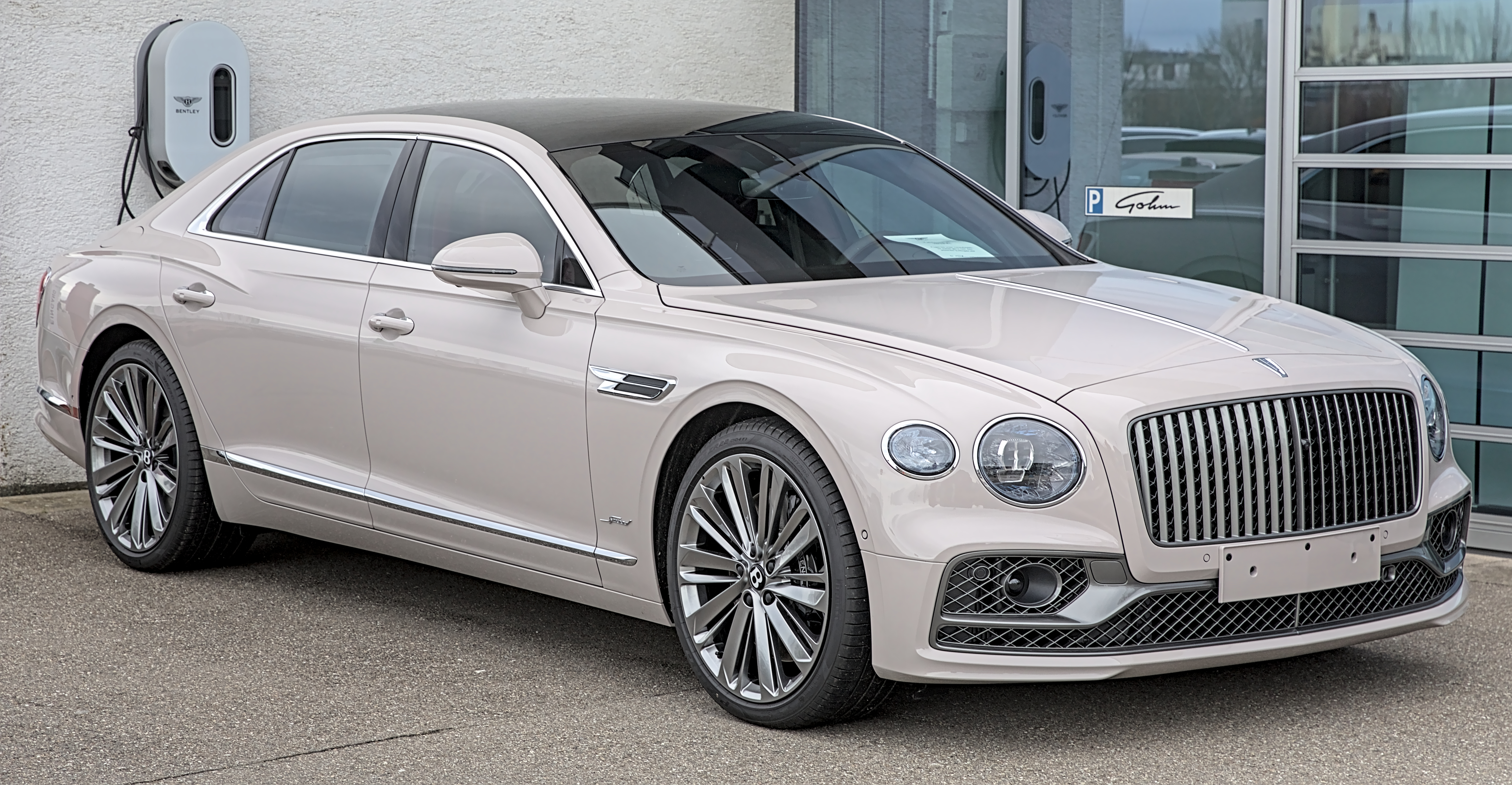

Overview
- Manufacturer: Bentley Motors
- Production: November 2005 – present
- Model years: 2006–present
- Assembly: United Kingdom: Crewe (Bentley Crewe)

Body and chassis
- Class: Full-size luxury car (F); Ultra-luxury car
- Body style: 4-door saloon
- Layout: Longitudinal F4 layout

The Bentley Flying Spur, known as the Bentley Continental Flying Spur before 2013, is a full-sized luxury car produced by Bentley Motors Limited since 2005. It is the four-door saloon variant of the Bentley Continental GT two-door coupé.

The Flying Spur is assembled by hand at Bentley's factory in Crewe, England. Briefly, due to lack of capacity at the Crewe factory upon the car's introduction, 1,358 units of the first generation Flying Spur destined for markets other than the United States and United Kingdom were built at parent-company Volkswagen's Transparent Factory in Dresden, Germany. This arrangement ended in early 2007, when all assembly works reverted to Crewe.

== First generation (2005–2013) ==
First generation
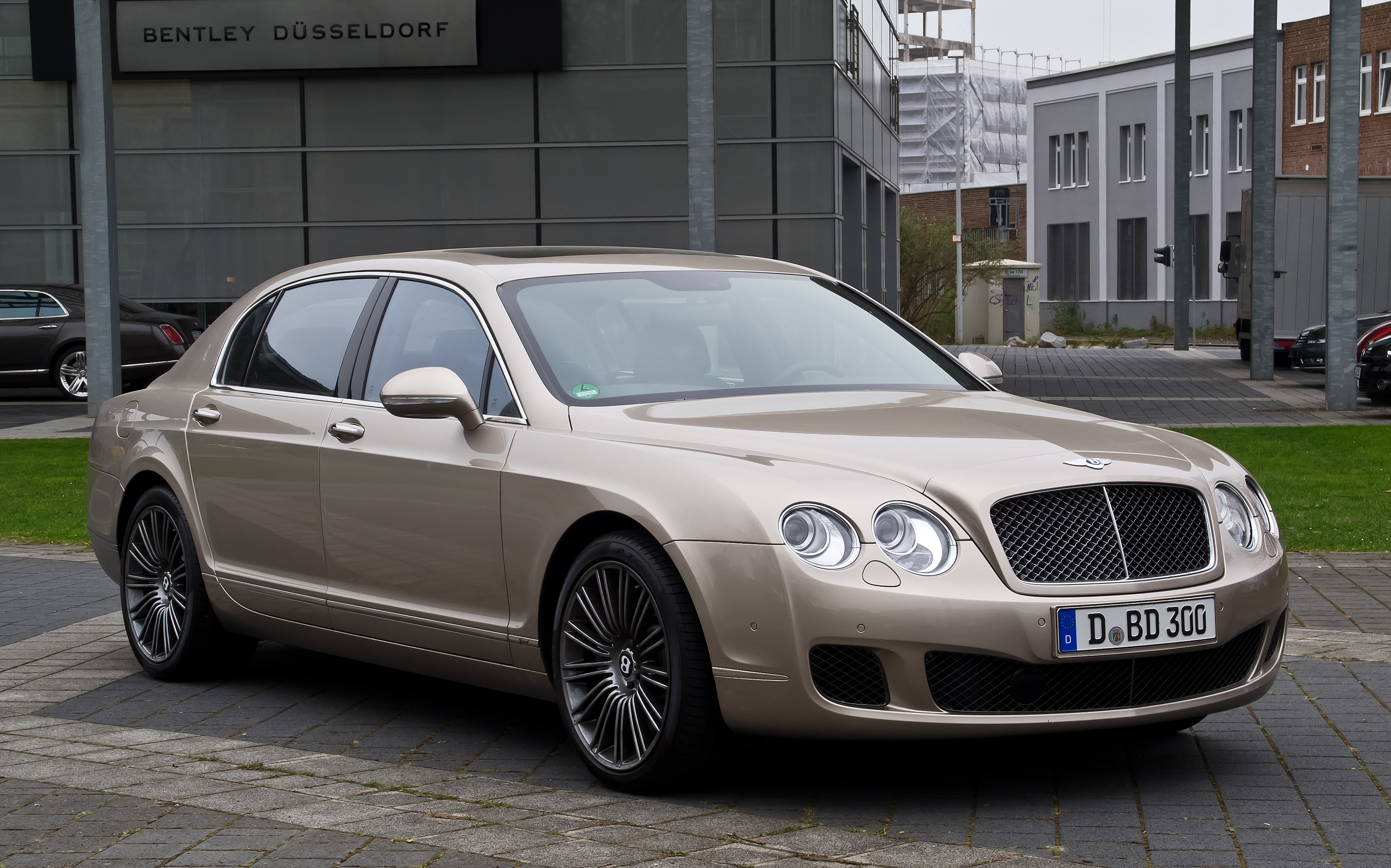

Overview
- Production: 2005–2013
- Model years: 2006–2013
- Designer: Dirk van Braeckel (2001)

Body and chassis
- Platform: Volkswagen Group D1
- Related: Bentley Continental GT; Volkswagen Phaeton

Powertrain
- Engine: 6.0 L W12 twin-turbo
- Transmission: 6-speed ZF 6HP26A tiptronic automatic

Dimensions
- Wheelbase: 3,065 mm (120.7 in)
- Length: 2006–08: 5,306 mm (208.9 in); 2009–13: 5,290 mm (208.3 in)
- Width: 1,915 mm (75.4 in)
- Height: 2006–08: 1,478 mm (58.2 in); 2009–13: 1,476 mm (58.1 in)
- Kerb weight: 2,475 kg (5,456 lb)

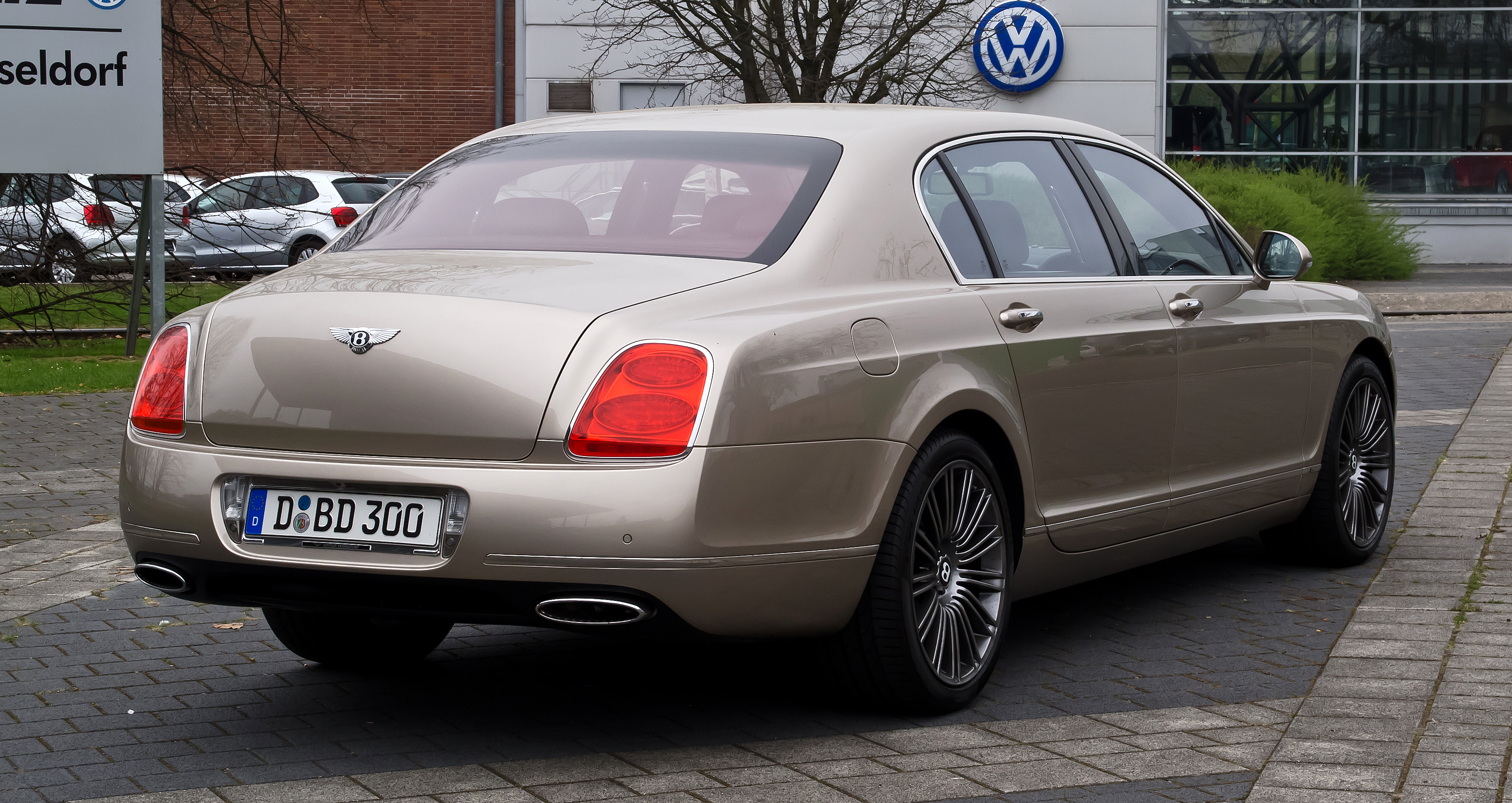
Bentley Flying Spur rear

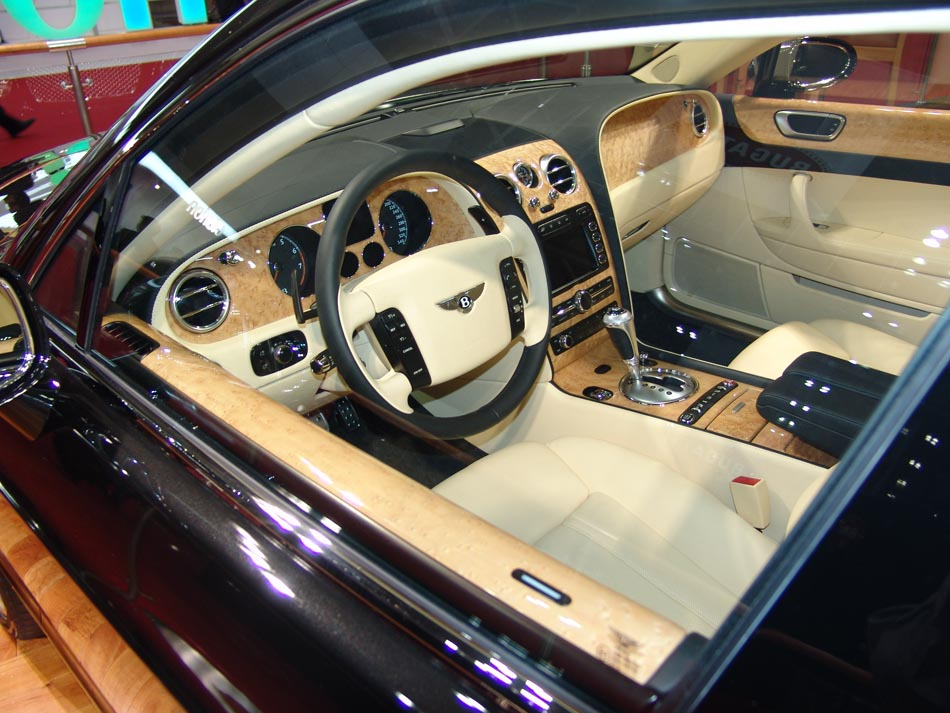
Interior

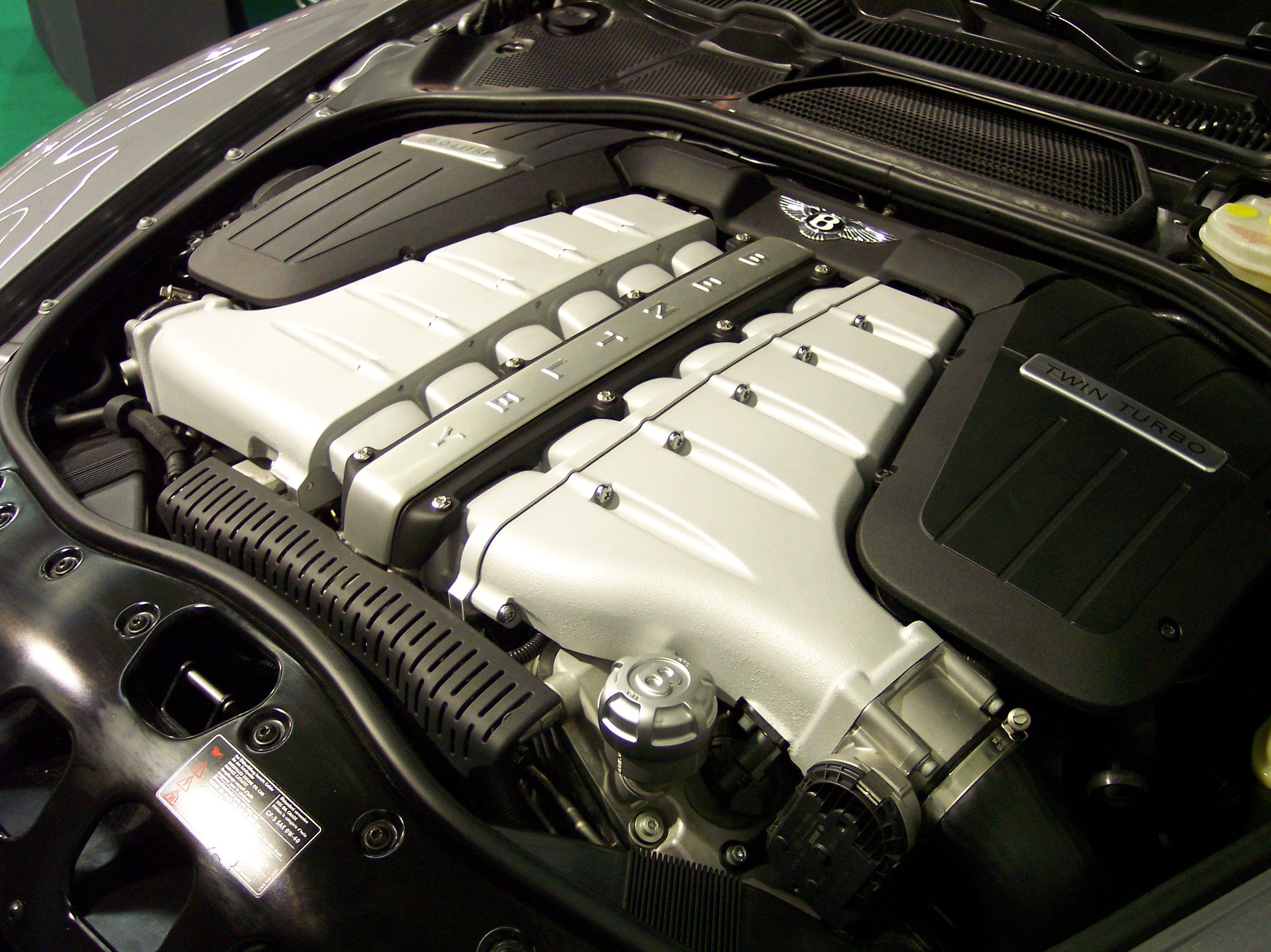
6.0 Twin-turbo W12 engine

=== Overview ===
The first-generation Flying Spur was officially unveiled at the 75th Geneva Motor Show in March 2005. It had a 5,998 cc (6.0 L) twin-turbocharged W12 engine tuned to produce 560 PS (412 kW; 552 bhp) and torque of 650 N⋅m (479 lbf⋅ft) at 1,600–6,100 rpm. Torsen-based permanent all-wheel drive system was standard on the Flying Spur. It can go 0–100 km/h (0.0–62.1 mph) in 4.9 seconds, and can reach a top speed of 314 km/h (195 mph). It also has Adaptive Air Suspension and Continuous Damping Control as standard. At that time, it was the world's fastest and most powerful production saloon.

Sales of the first-generation Flying Spur began in late 2005. During the first full-year sales of the Flying Spur, the number of deliveries exceeded 4,000 units. The Speed model of the Flying Spur was introduced in 2008 as a higher performance variant with revised ceramic disc brakes and tuned to produce 602 horsepower. The acceleration of the Speed model is 0–100 km/h (0.0–62.1 mph) in 4.5 seconds, and can reach a top speed of 322 km/h (200 mph). A total of 1,155 units of the Speed model were produced in model years 2009 and 2010.

=== Engines ===
Petrol engines
Model	Years	Type/code	Power at rpm, Torque at rpm
Flying Spur	2005–2013	5,998 cc (366.0 cu in) W12 twin turbo	560 PS (412 kW; 552 hp) at 6,100, 650 N⋅m (479 lb⋅ft) at 1,600–6,100
Flying Spur Speed	2008–2013	5,998 cc (366.0 cu in) W12 twin turbo	610 PS (449 kW; 602 hp) at 6,000, 750 N⋅m (553 lb⋅ft) at 1,700–5,600

=== Transmissions ===
Petrol engines
Model	Years	Types
Flying Spur	2005–2013	ZF 6-speed automatic with wheel-mounted paddle shifters
Flying Spur Speed	2008–2013	ZF 6-speed automatic with wheel-mounted paddle shifters

The steering column-mounted paddle shifters enable direct access to the six-speed gearbox when the ZF transmission is in "S" or sports mode.

== Second generation (2013–2019) ==
Second generation
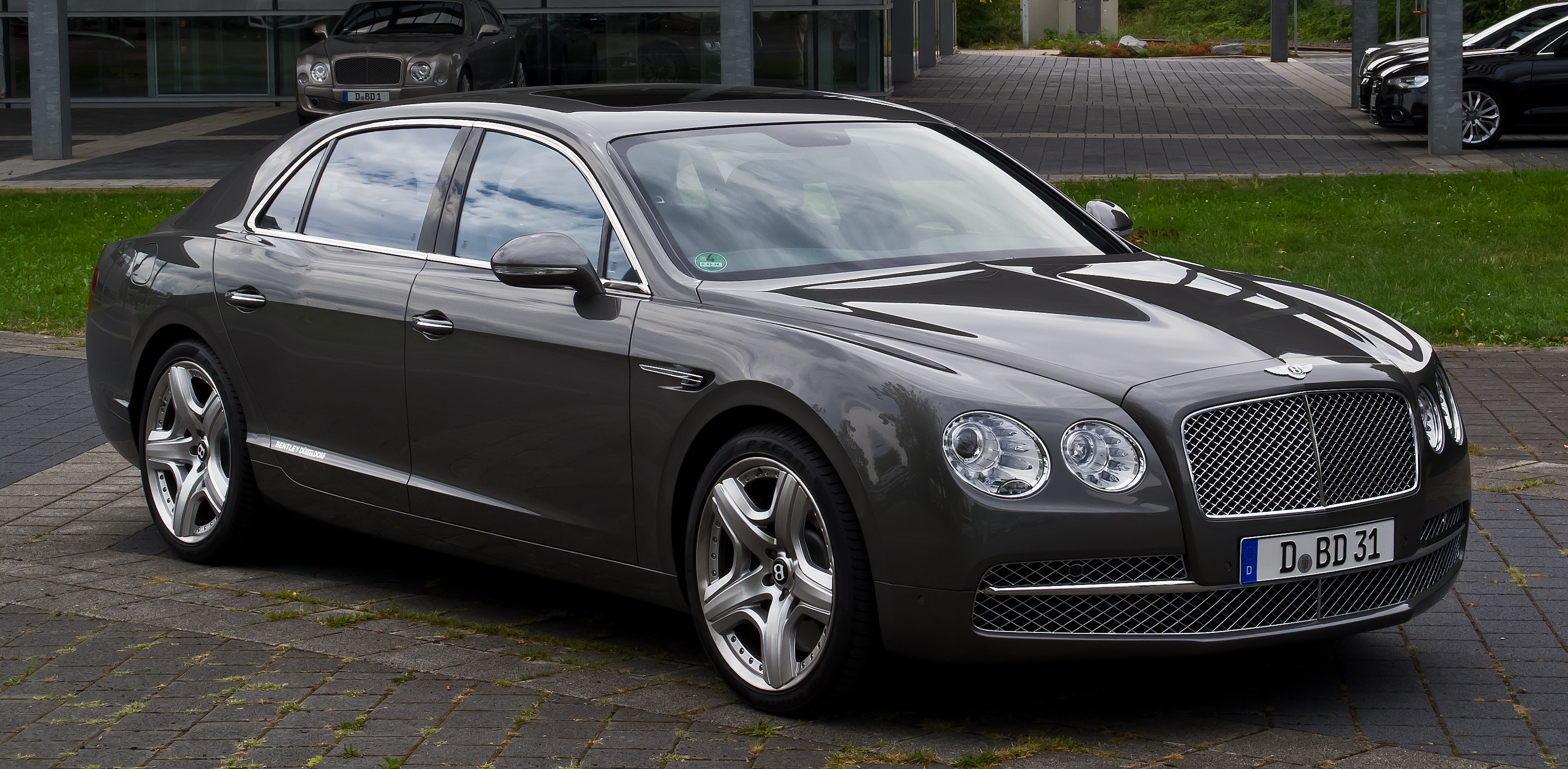

Overview
- Production: 2013–2019
- Designer: Luc Donckerwolke

Body and chassis
- Platform: Volkswagen Group D1
- Related: Bentley Continental GT; Volkswagen Phaeton

Powertrain
- Engine: 6.0 L W12 twin-turbo 4.0 L V8 twin-turbo
- Transmission: 8-speed automatic

Dimensions
- Wheelbase: 3,066 mm (120.7 in)
- Length: 5,299 mm (208.6 in)
- Width: 1,978 mm (77.9 in)
- Height: 1,488 mm (58.6 in)
- Kerb weight: 2,475 kg (5,456 lb)

The second generation Flying Spur was unveiled in March 2013 at the 2013 Geneva Motor Show. In addition to the W12 engine from the previous generation, a lower-cost V8-engined version was also available.

The "Continental" prefix was omitted; according to Bentley's designers, this was a conscious attempt to take the Flying Spur in a more opulent direction and distance it from the more driver-oriented, two-door Continental GT range (historically, the Continental name has generally been used by Bentley to refer to models of a "sporting" nature). Despite this, the Flying Spur and Continental GT continue to share the same engineering platform.

=== Engines ===
Petrol engines
Model	Years	Type/code	Power at rpm, Torque at rpm
Flying Spur W12	2013–2019	5,998 cc (366.0 cu in) W12 twin turbo	625 PS (460 kW; 616 hp) at 6,000, 800 N⋅m (590 lb⋅ft) at 2,000
Flying Spur V8	2014–2019	3,993 cc (243.7 cu in) V8 twin turbo	507 PS (373 kW; 500 hp) at 6,000, 660 N⋅m (487 lb⋅ft) at 1,700 (1,750?)
Flying Spur V8 S	2016–2019	3,993 cc (243.7 cu in) V8 twin turbo	528 PS (388 kW; 521 hp) at 6,000, 680 N⋅m (502 lb⋅ft) at 1,700
Flying Spur W12 S	2016–2019	5,998 cc (366.0 cu in) W12 twin turbo	635 PS (467 kW; 626 hp) at 6,000, 820 N⋅m (605 lb⋅ft) at 2,000

=== Transmissions ===
Petrol engines
Model	Years	Types
Flying Spur W12	2013–2019	ZF 8-speed automatic with Quickshift, Block Shifting and wheel-mounted paddle shifters
Flying Spur V8	2014–2019	ZF 8-speed automatic with Quickshift, Block Shifting and wheel-mounted paddle shifters
Flying Spur V8 S	2016–2019	ZF 8-speed automatic with Quickshift, Block Shifting and wheel-mounted paddle shifters

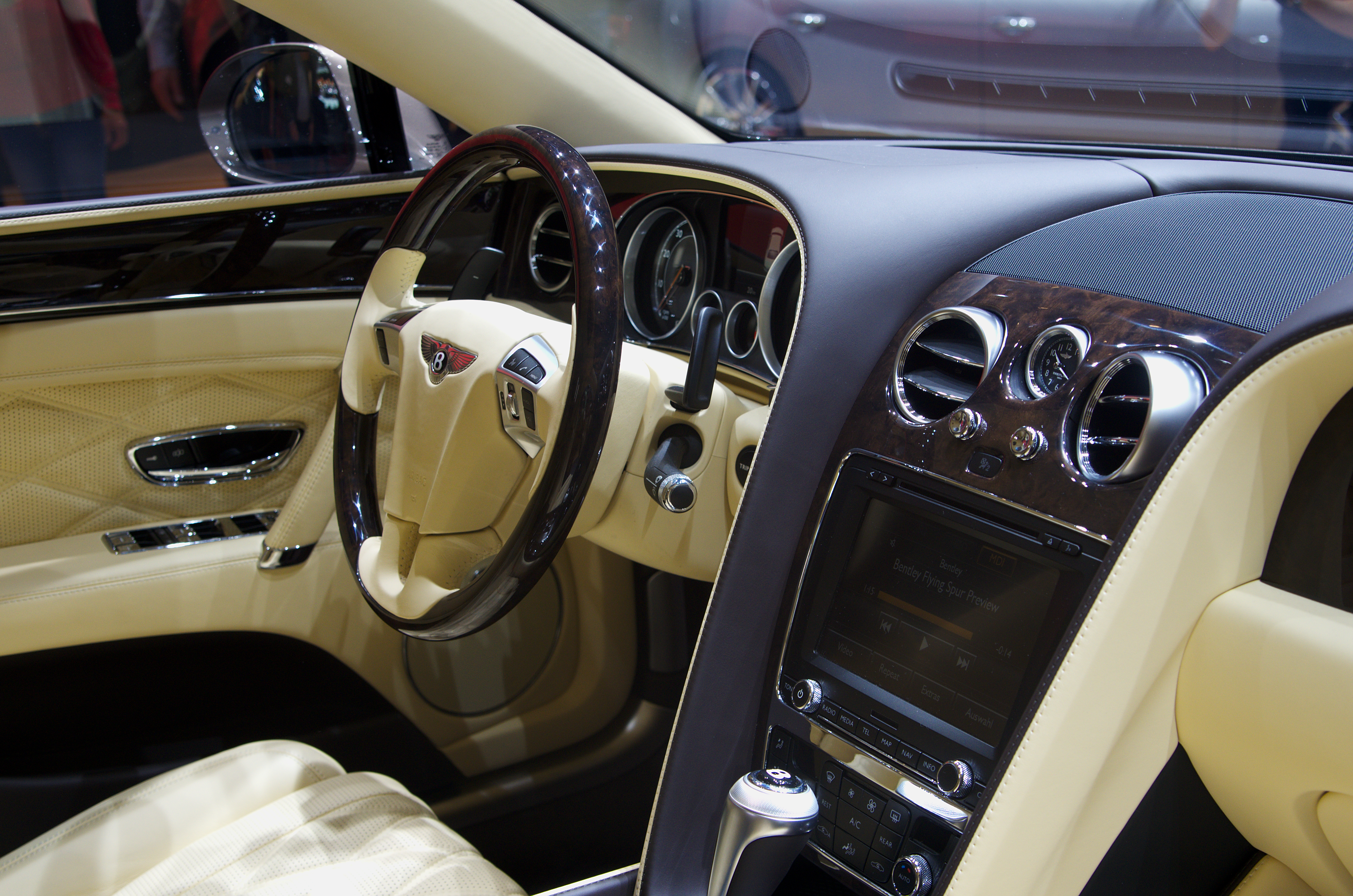
Interior

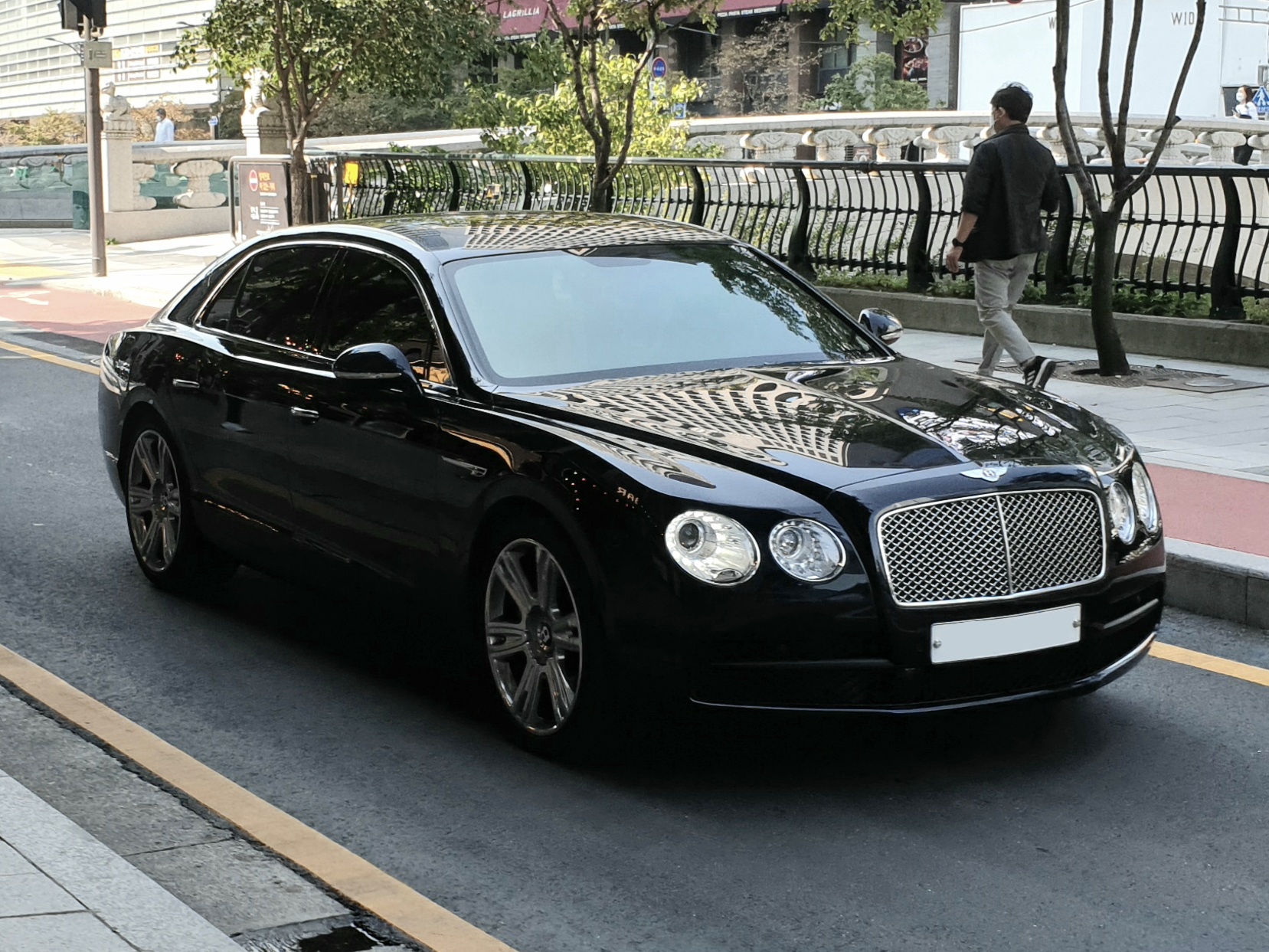
Bentley Flying Spur V8 front

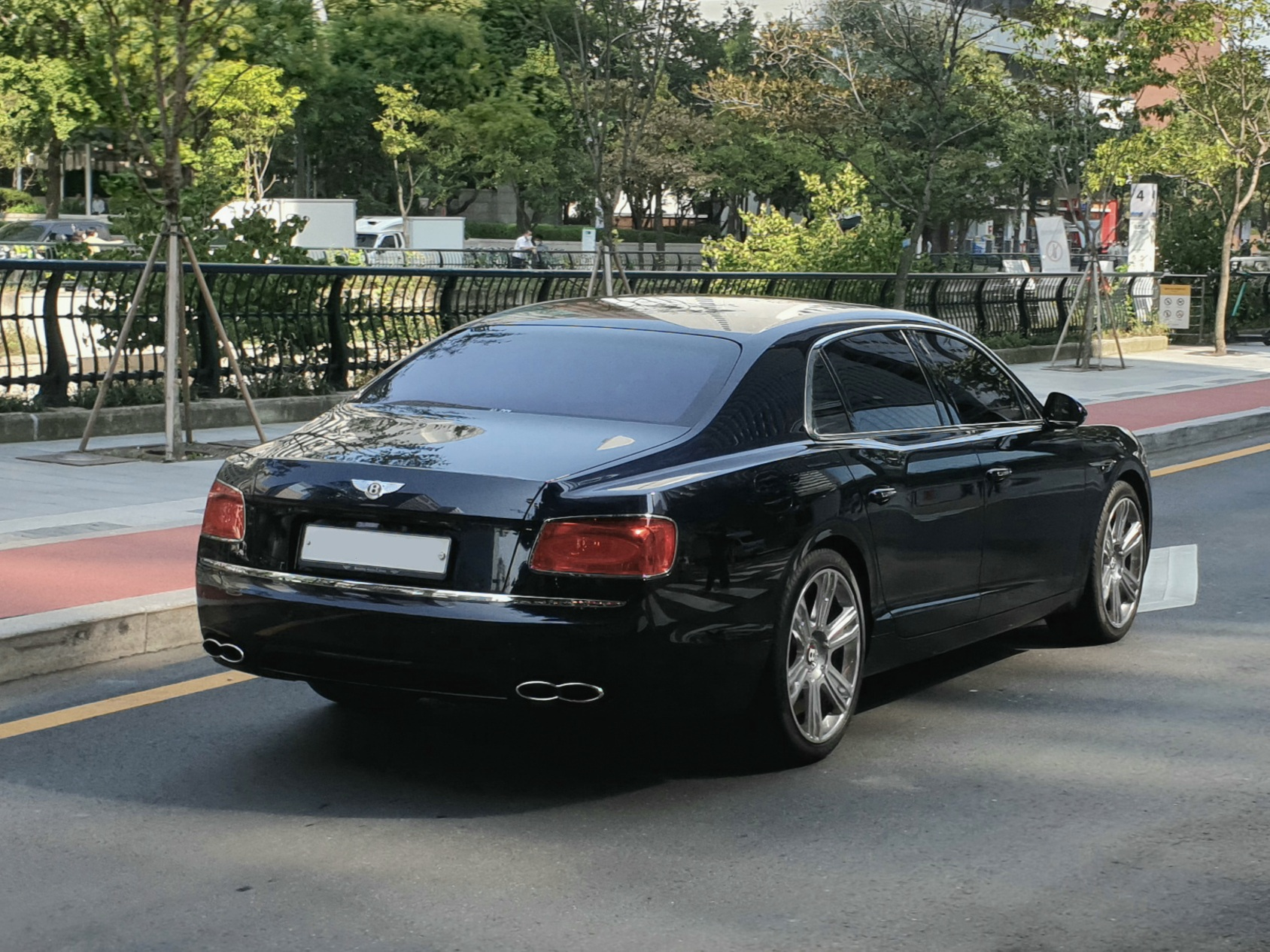
Bentley Flying Spur V8 rear

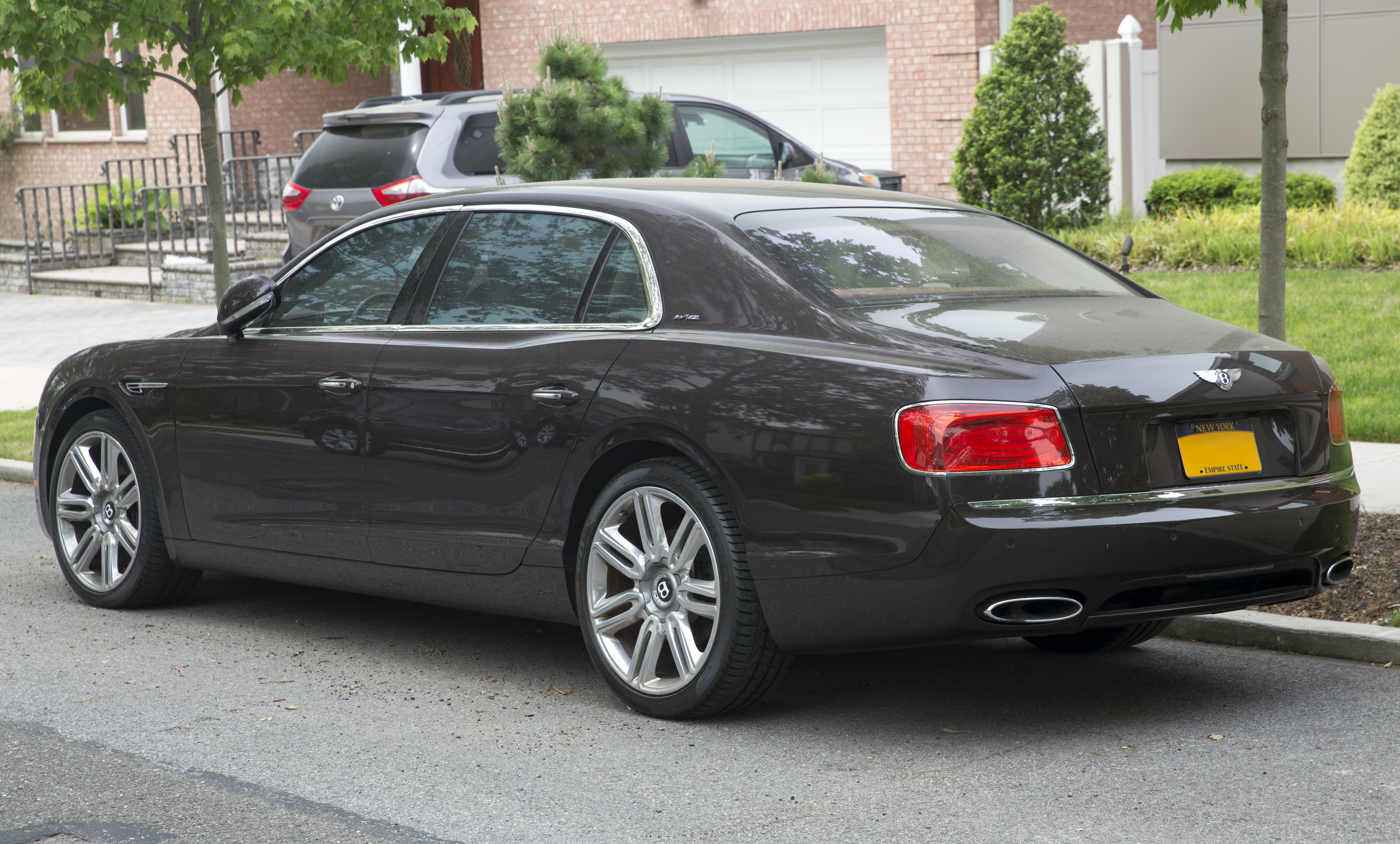
Bentley Flying Spur W12 rear

== Third generation (2019–present) ==
Third generation
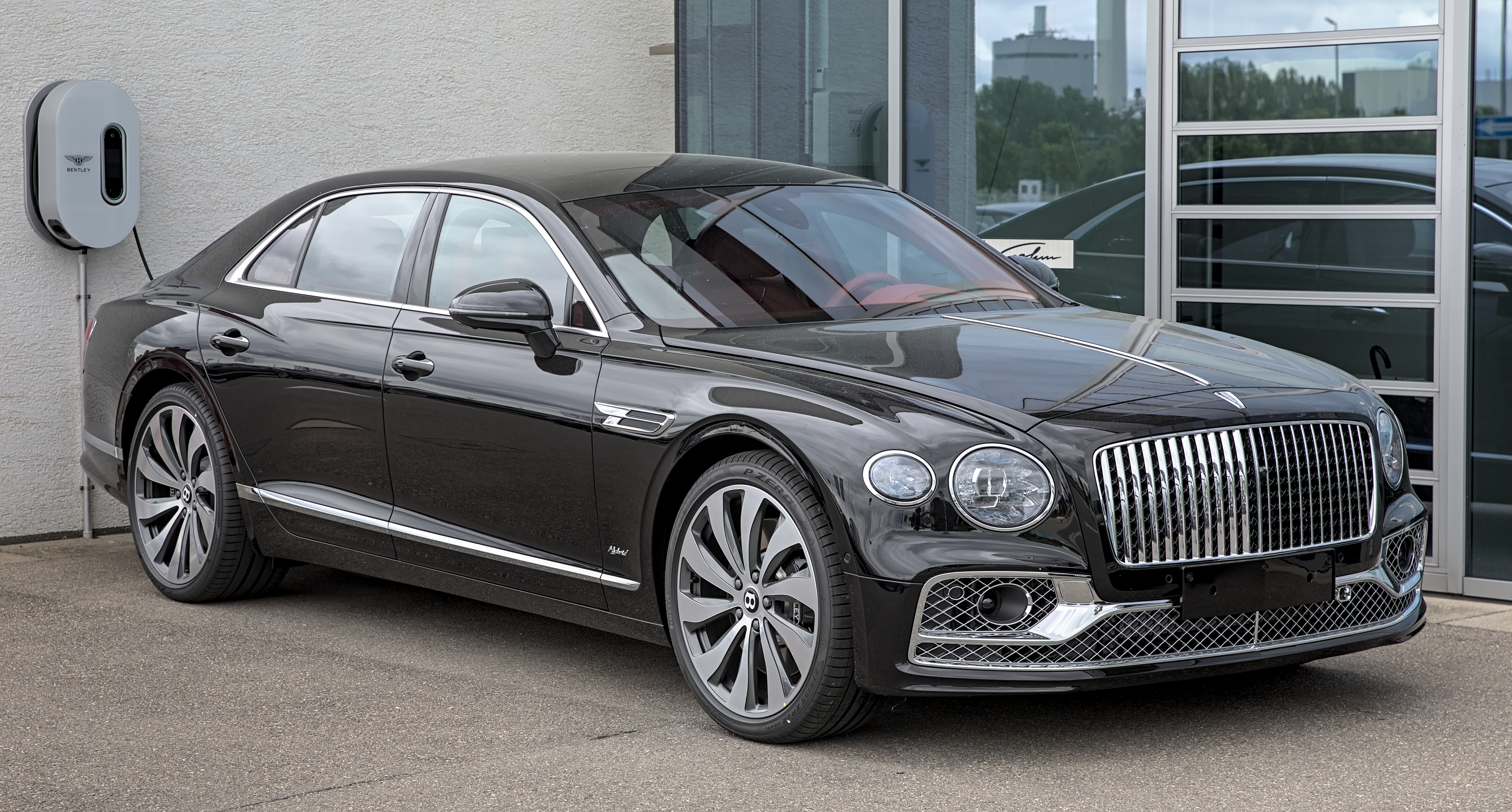

Overview
- Production: 2019–present
- Designer: Stefan Sielaff

Body and chassis
- Platform: Volkswagen Group MSB platform
- Related: Bentley Continental GT; Porsche Panamera (LWB)

Powertrain
- Engine: Pre-Facelift; 6.0 L W12 twin-turbo; 4.0 L V8 twin-turbo; Post-Facelift; 4.0 L V8 Ultra Performance Hybrid twin-turbo; 4.0 L V8 High Performance Hybrid twin-turbo; Both models; 2.9 L V6 twin-turbo PHEV
- Electric motor: 100 kW (134 hp; 136 PS) AC induction motor: PHEV; Permanent Magnet Syncronus motor (V8 Ultra Performance Hybrid and High Performance Hybrid)
- Power output: 782 PS (771 hp; 575 kW); 680 PS (671 hp; 500 kW)
- Transmission: 8-speed Porsche PDK
- Hybrid drivetrain: PHEV (Flying Spur Hybrid, Ultra performance and high performance V8 PHEV)
- Battery: 14.1 kWh Lithium ion
- Electric range: 25 mi (40 km)

Dimensions
- Wheelbase: 3,194 mm (125.7 in)
- Length: 5,316 mm (209.3 in)
- Width: 1,987 mm (78.2 in)
- Height: 1,484 mm (58.4 in)
- Kerb weight: 2,437 kg (5,373 lb) (W12); 2,330 kg (5,137 lb) (V8)

Chronology
- Predecessor: Bentley Mulsanne (indirect)

The third-generation Flying Spur was unveiled in June 2019. The car has been completely overhauled and is built on a brand-new platform, resembling the current Continental GT. The front received a new grille with vertical slats, akin to those of Rolls-Royce era Bentleys, while the rear features new taillights that incorporate a B motif. The bonnet mascot is now illuminated at night, electrically deployable, and capable of meeting pedestrian impact requirements. The interior has an optional rotating 12.3 in (31.2 cm) display and an all-new touch screen remote that allows rear occupants to control several systems.

Rear-wheel steering is new and is accompanied by air springs with 60 percent more volume than its predecessor. The all-wheel-drive system is also new and uses an electronically controlled clutch pack. Compared to the second generation model, the new Flying Spur gets close to 130 mm additional wheelbase.

=== Variants ===
- Flying Spur First Edition (2019‒2020)
- Flying Spur (2019‒present)
- Flying Spur Azure (2022‒present)
- Flying Spur S (2022‒2024)
- Flying Spur Speed (2023‒present)
- Flying Spur Mulliner (2021‒present)
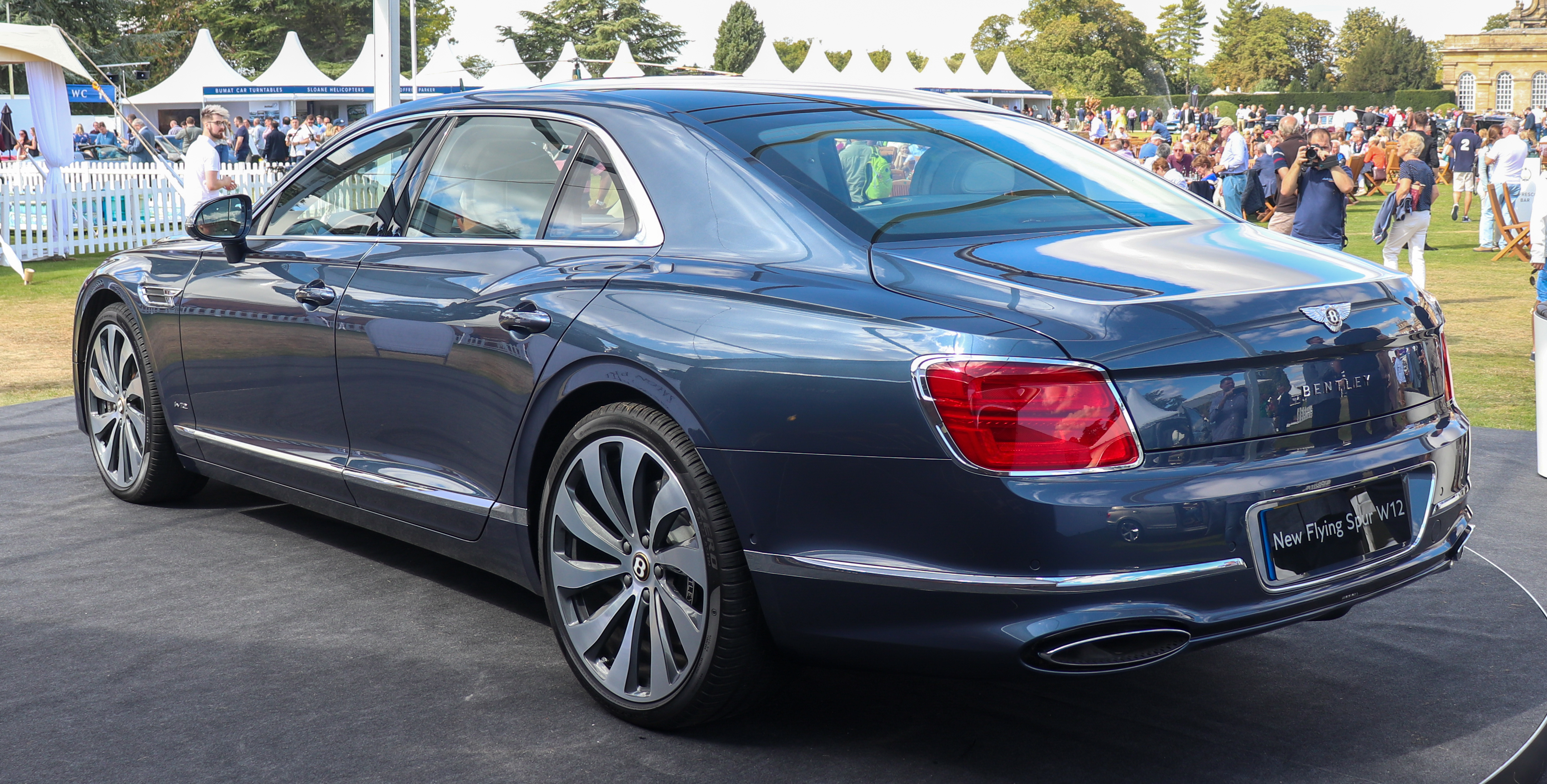
W12, rear view

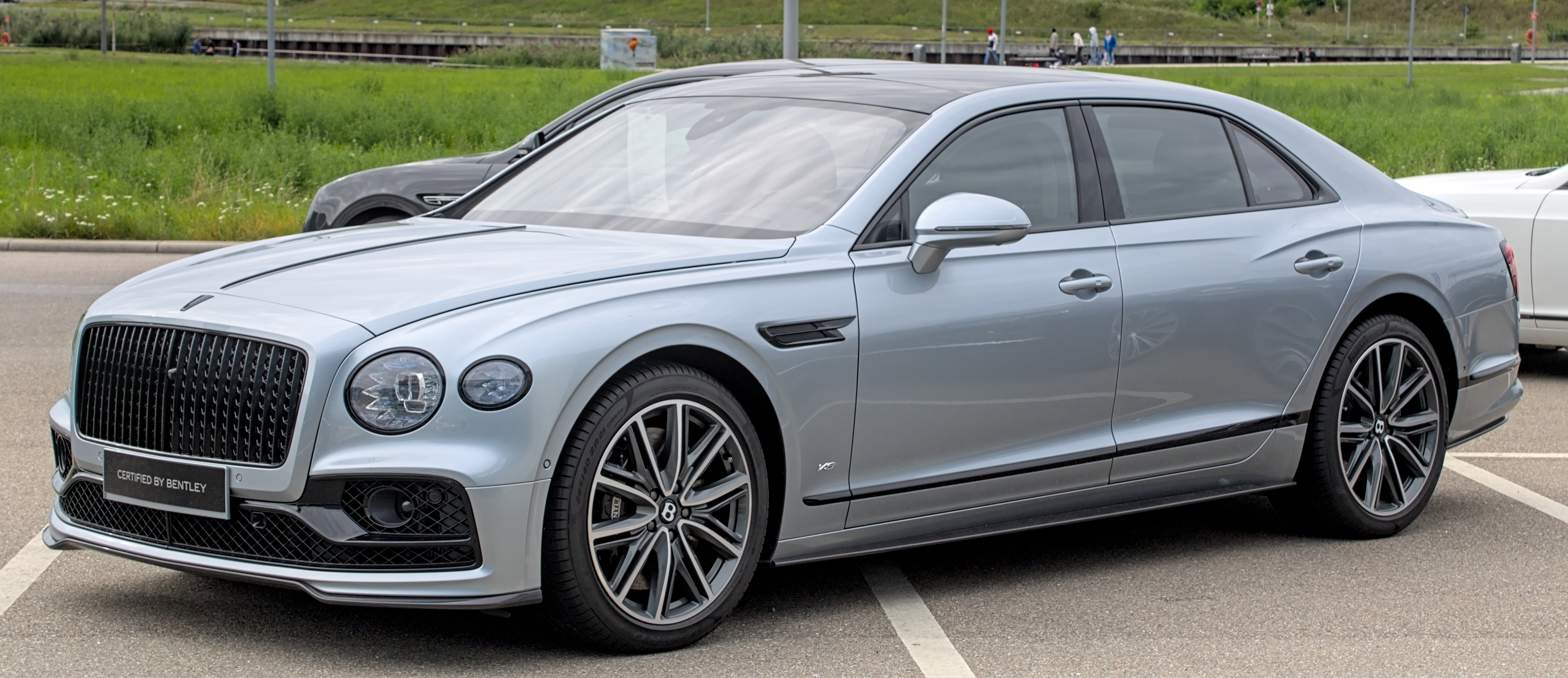
V8, front view

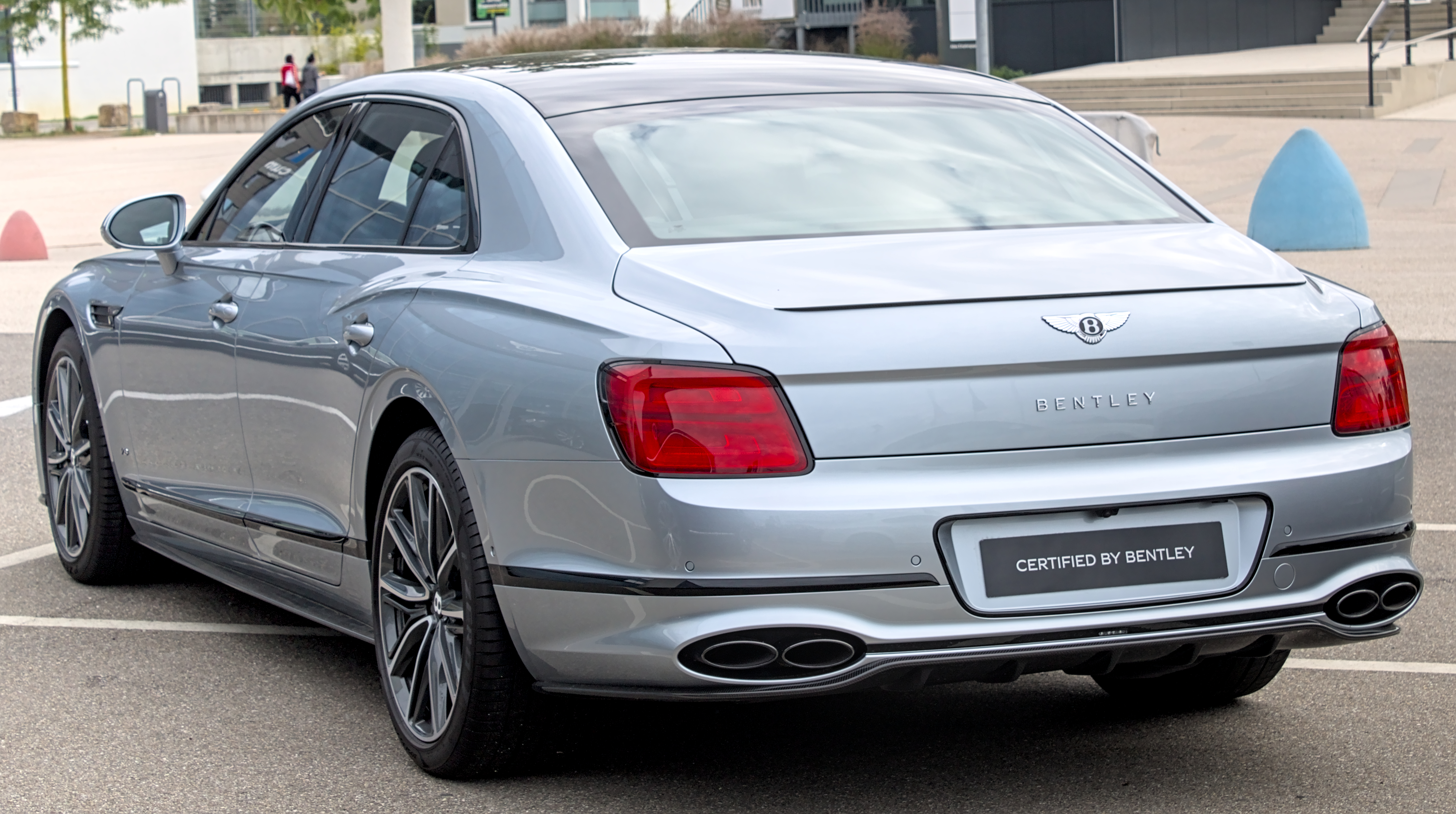
V8, rear view

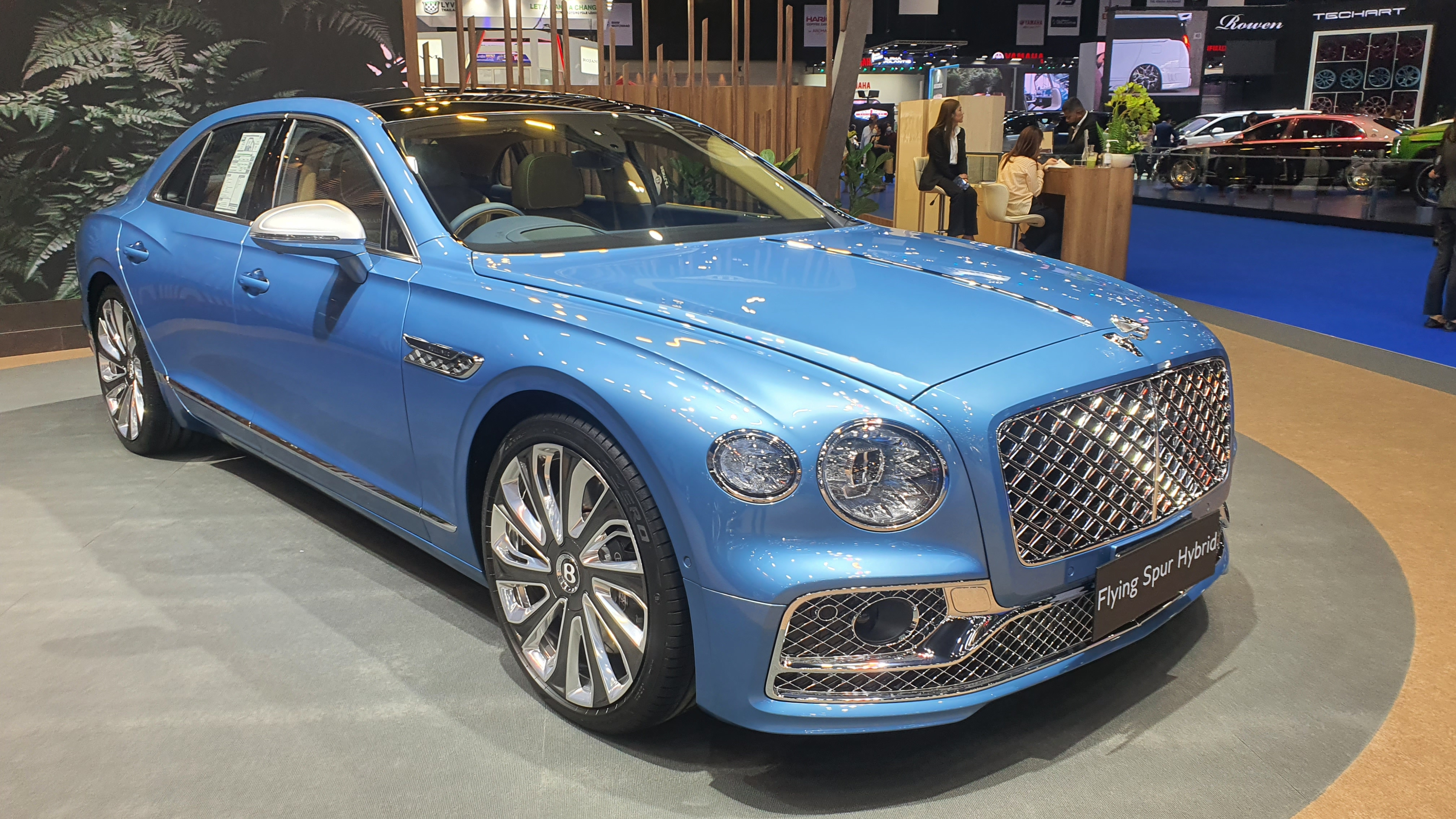
Mulliner Variant; V6 Hybrid

=== Powertrains ===
There are three powertrains available for the Flying Spur: a 6.0 L W12, a 4.0 L V8, and 2.9 L V6 plug-in hybrid, all of which have twin turbos. The W12 variant accelerates from 0–60 mph (0–97 km/h) in 3.7 seconds and reaches a maximum speed of 211 mph (340 km/h). It produces 626 horsepower (467 kW) and 664 pound-feet (900 N⋅m) of torque. It is available only on the Mulliner and the Speed Variants.

The V8 variant produces 549 hp (409 kW) and 568 lb⋅ft (770 N⋅m) of torque and accelerates from 0-62 mph in 4.1 seconds, with a top speed of 198 mph (319 km/h). It is available on all trim levels except for the Speed and Odyssean edition.

The plug-in hybrid variant uses a 2.9 liter V6 engine combined with a 25.9 kilowatt-hour battery to deliver a claimed electric range of 40 kilometers (25 miles) and a 0-60 time of 4.1 seconds. With a combined power of 536 hp (400 kW) and a top speed of 177 mph (285 km/h), it is the slowest of the three powertrains. It is available on all variants except for the Speed Variant.

The Flying Spur became the only Bentley sedan model after the production of the Mulsanne ended in the second quarter of 2020 without a direct successor.

In March 2021, Bentley issued a recall for a single Flying Spur due to an improper welding process used on the fuel tank.

Powertrains
Model	Drive type	Engine(s)		Max. Power		Max. Torque		Top Speed		0–100 km/h (0-62 mph)	
Flying Spur	All-wheel drive	4.0 L twin-turbo V8	2.9 L V6 (with electric motor)	399 kW (542 bhp)	394 kW (536 bhp)	770 N·m (568 ft·lb)	750 N·m (553 ft·lb)	319 km/h (198 mph)	285 km/h (177 mph)	4.0 seconds	4.1 seconds
Flying Spur Azure	All-wheel drive	4.0 L twin-turbo V8	2.9 L V6 (with electric motor)	399 kW (542 bhp)	394 kW (536 bhp)	770 N·m (568 ft·lb)	750 N·m (553 ft·lb)	319 km/h (198 mph)	285 km/h (177 mph)	4.0 seconds	4.1 seconds
Flying Spur S	All-wheel drive	4.0 L twin-turbo V8	2.9 L V6 (with electric motor)	399 kW (542 bhp)	394 kW (536 bhp)	770 N·m (568 ft·lb)	750 N·m (553 ft·lb)	319 km/h (198 mph)	285 km/h (177 mph)	4.0 seconds	4.1 seconds
Flying Spur Speed	All-wheel drive	6.0 L twin-turbo W12	*4.0 L twin-turbo V8 (with electric motor)	467 kW (626 bhp)	*575 kW (771 bhp)	900 N·m (664 ft·lb).	*n/a	333 km/h (207 mph)	*n/a	3.7 seconds	*n/a.
Flying Spur Mulliner	All-wheel drive	6.0 L twin-turbo W12	*4.0 L twin-turbo V8 (with electric motor)	467 kW (626 bhp)	*575 kW (771 bhp)	900 N·m (664 ft·lb).	*n/a	333 km/h (207 mph)	*n/a	3.7 seconds	*n/a.

=== 2024 facelift ===
The facelifted Flying Spur was unveiled in September 2024.

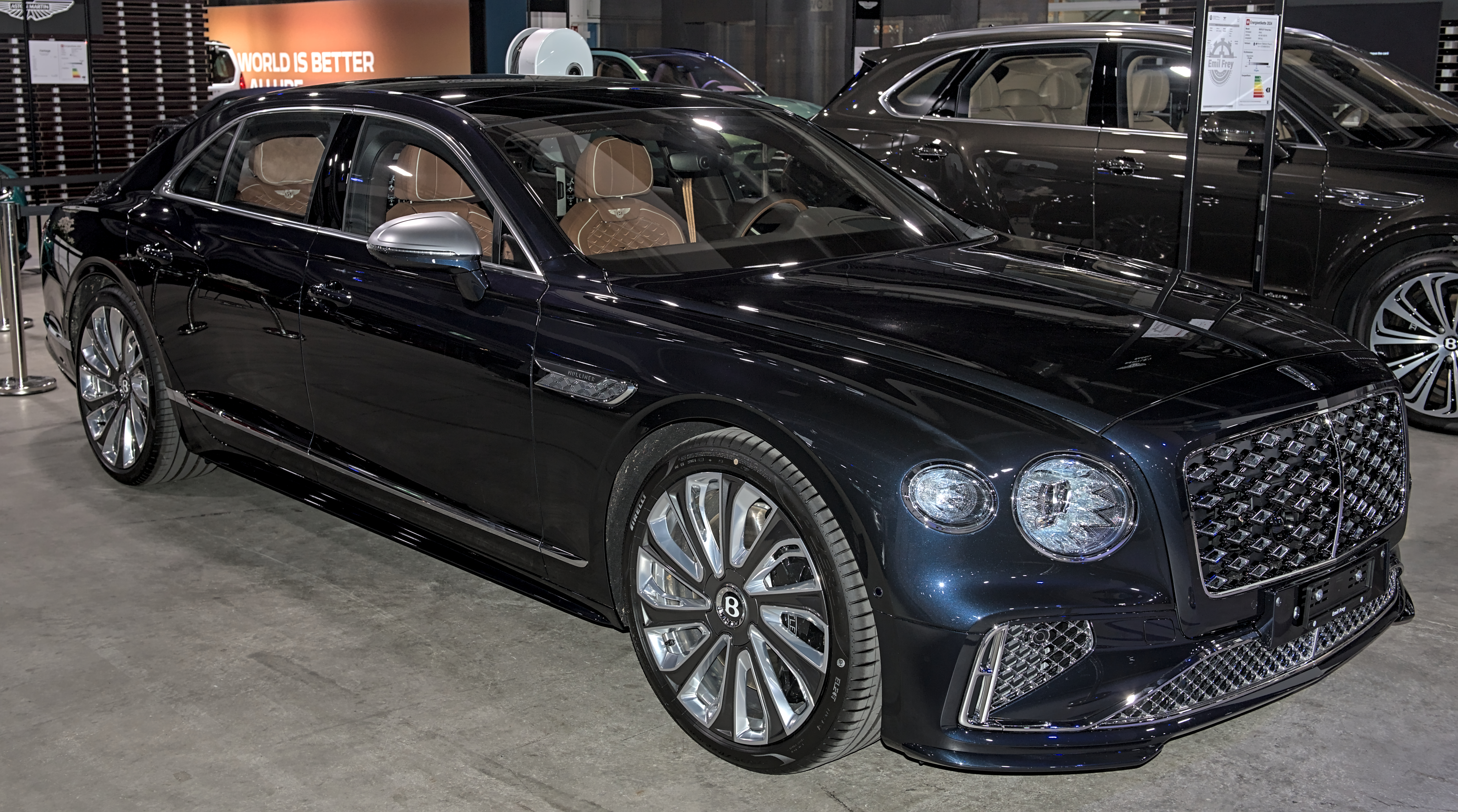
Mulliner Variant (facelift)

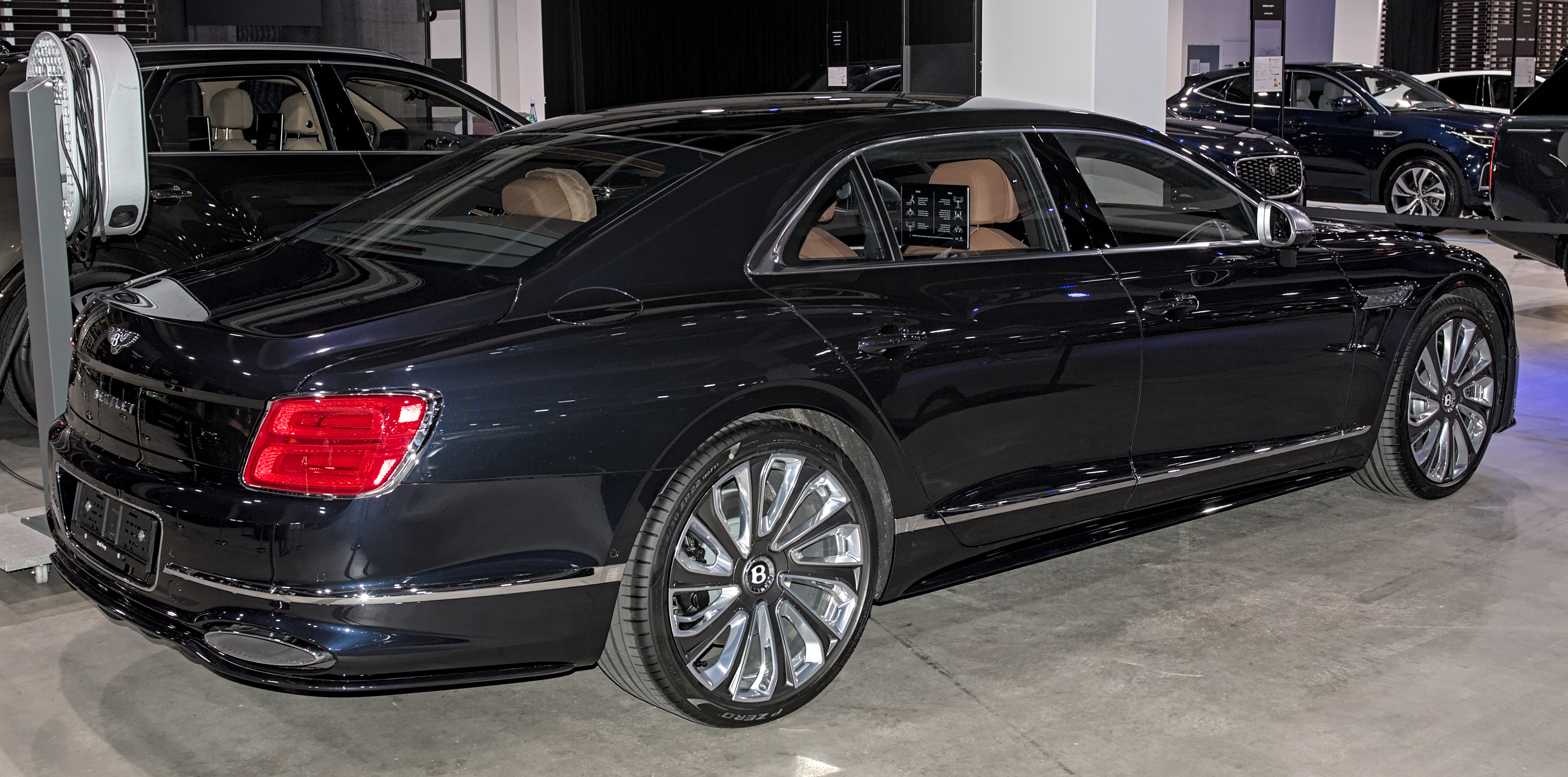
Mulliner Variant (facelift)

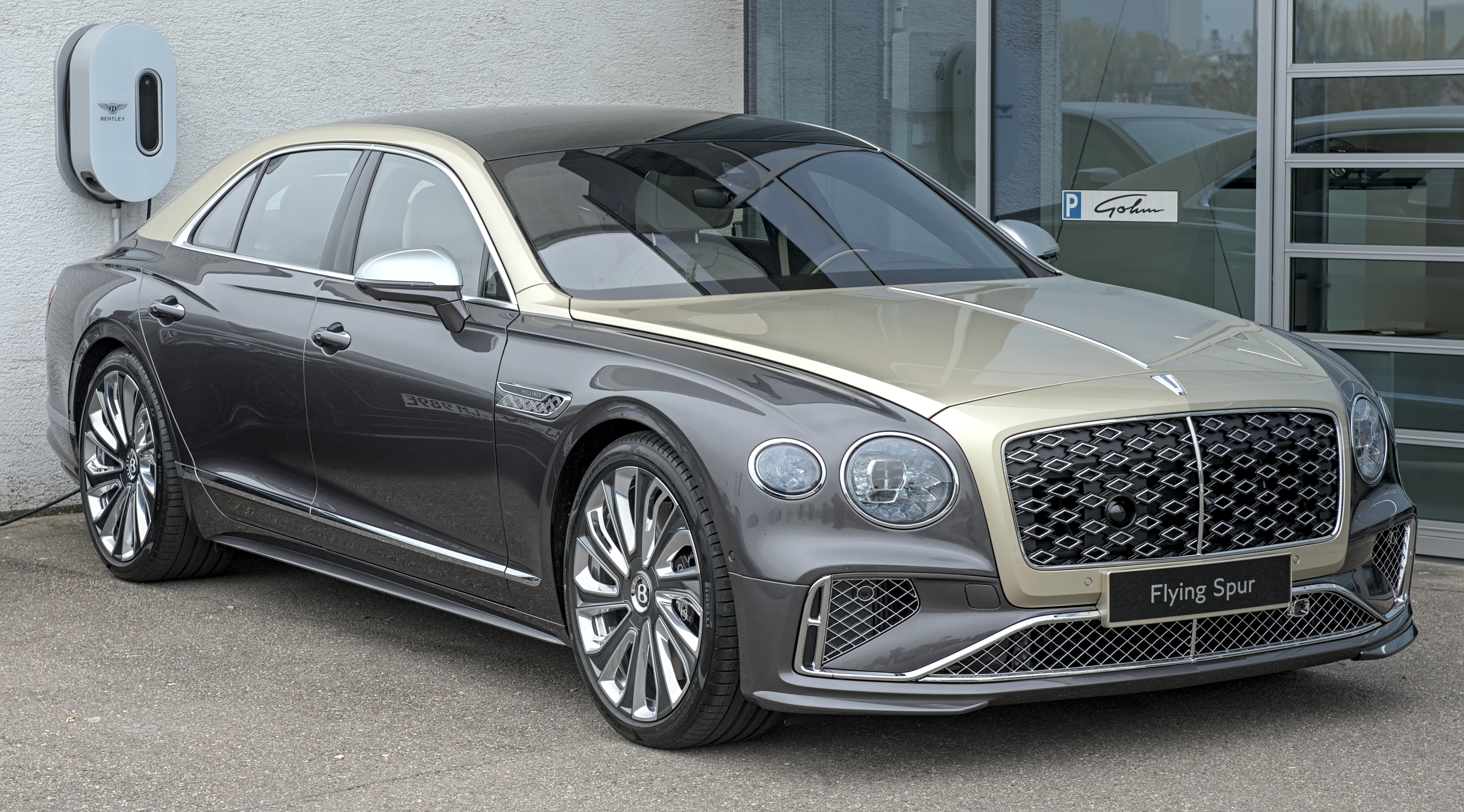
Flying Spur Mulliner

=== Special editions ===
==== Flying Spur Odyssean Edition (2021) ====
On 29 July 2021, Bentley announced a special edition of the Flying Spur, as a celebration of the new Flying Spur Hybrid. Dubbed the Odyssean Edition, it features exterior trims and 21" wheels both finished in Pale Brogar. The interior features open pore koa wood and piano linen console, tweed panels and a three-colour hide combination.

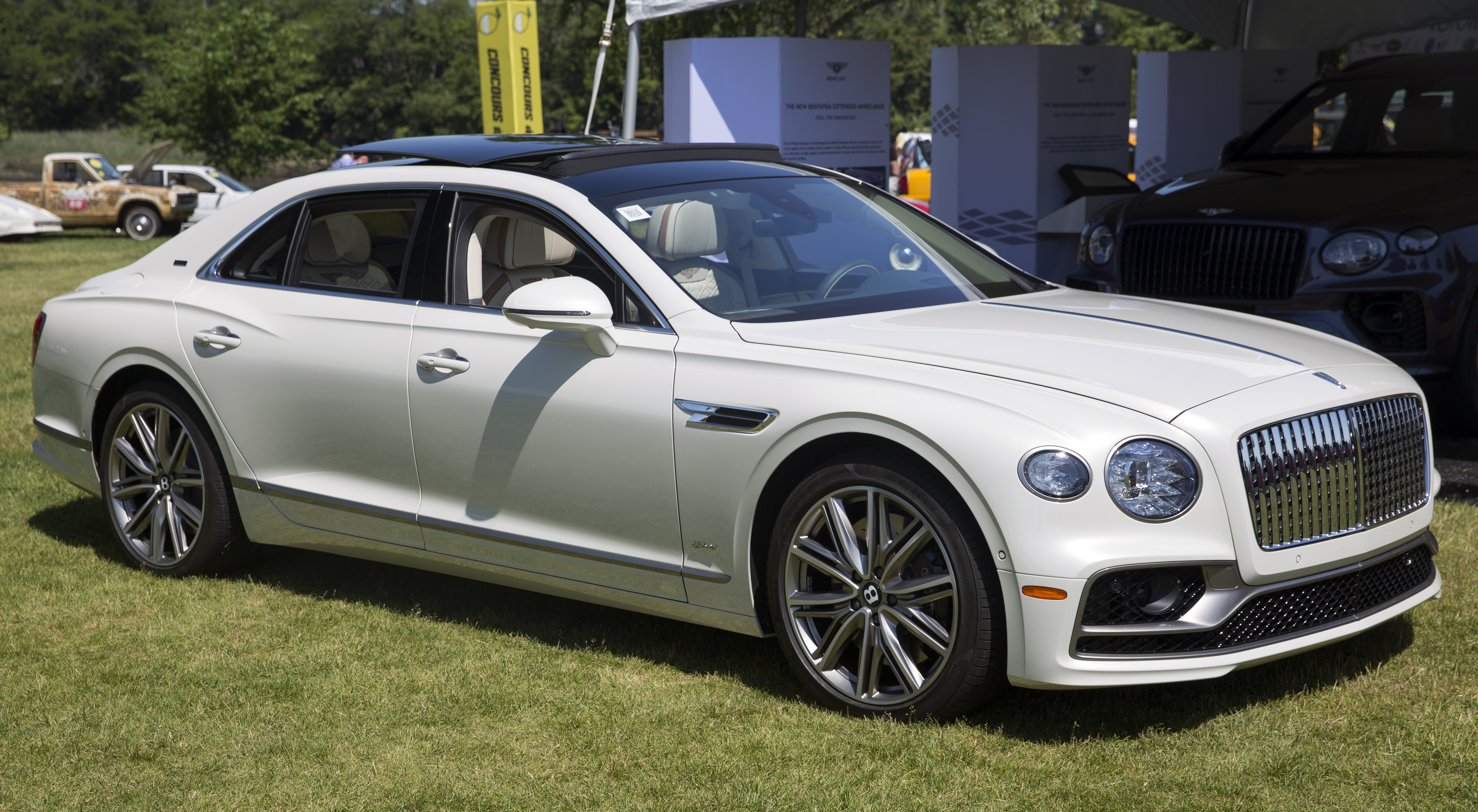
Odyssean Edition (Hybrid)

== Production ==
Year	Production
2005	4,271
2006	4,042
2007	2,270
2008	1,813
2009	1,358
2010	1,914
2011	2,354
2012	1,764
2013	3,960
2014	4,556
2015	3,660
2016	1,731
2017	2,295
2018	1,627
2019	102
2020	3,381
2021	3,947
2022	4,226
2023	3,178
