= Spyker C12 Zagato =

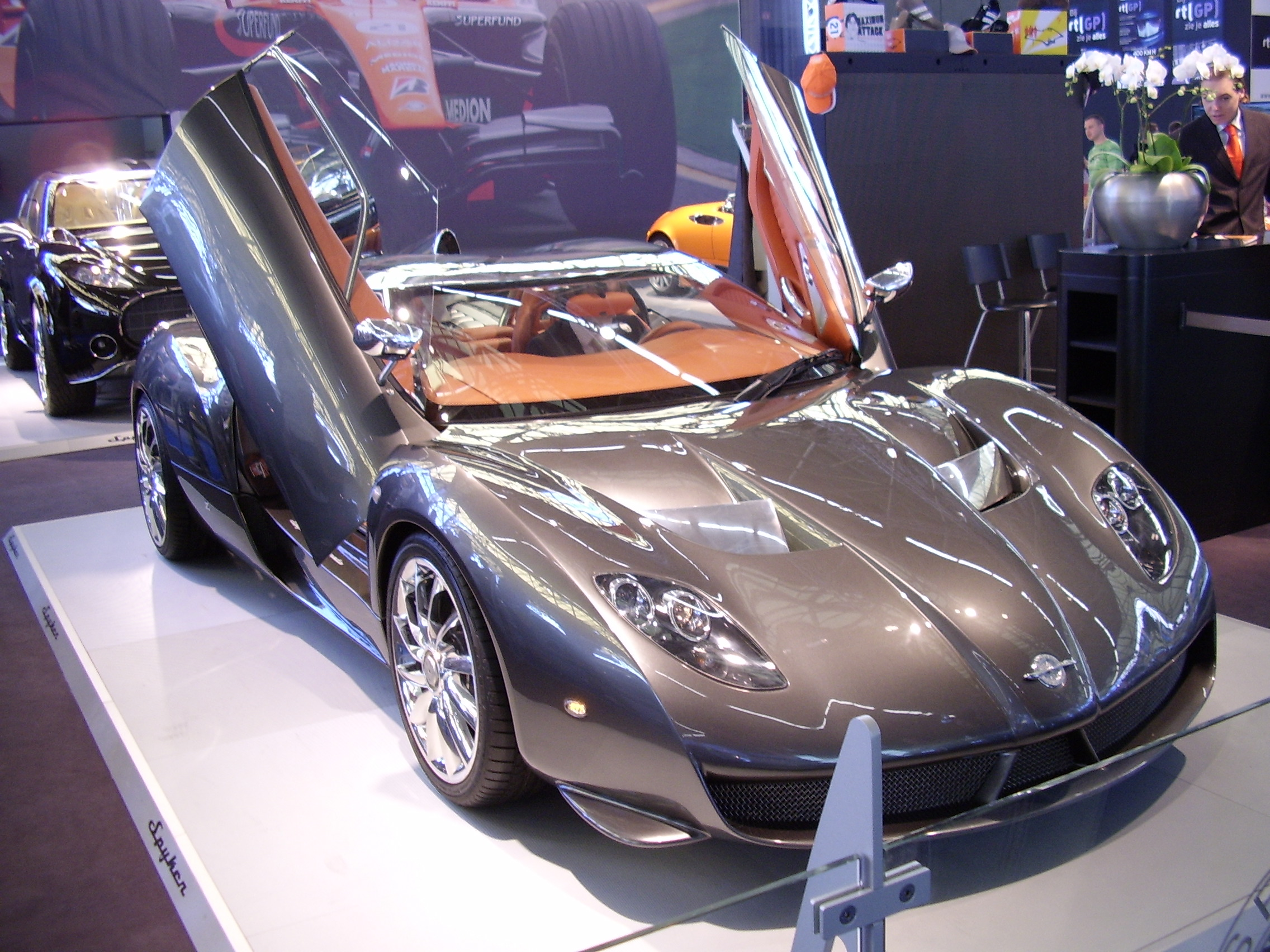

Overview
- Manufacturer: Spyker Cars
- Production: 2008; 1 built
- Designer: Norihiko Harada at Zagato

Body and chassis
- Class: Sports car (S)
- Body style: 2-door coupé
- Layout: Rear mid-engine, rear-wheel drive
- Doors: Scissor
- Related: Spyker C12 La Turbie

Powertrain
- Engine: VW Group 6.0 L W12, 500 hp (373 kW)
- Transmission: 6-speed manual 6-speed automatic

Dimensions
- Wheelbase: 2,680 mm (105.5 in)
- Length: 4,505 mm (177.4 in)
- Width: 2,031 mm (80.0 in)
- Height: 1,250 mm (49.2 in)
- Curb weight: 1,480 kg (3,263 lb)

The Spyker C12 Zagato is a limited edition, all-aluminium, mid-engine/rear-drive exotic luxury sports car from Dutch automobile manufacturer Spyker. It is based on the C12 platform, alongside the Spyker designed C12 La Turbie which debuted the previous year, and features a unique body designed with help from Italian design house Zagato.

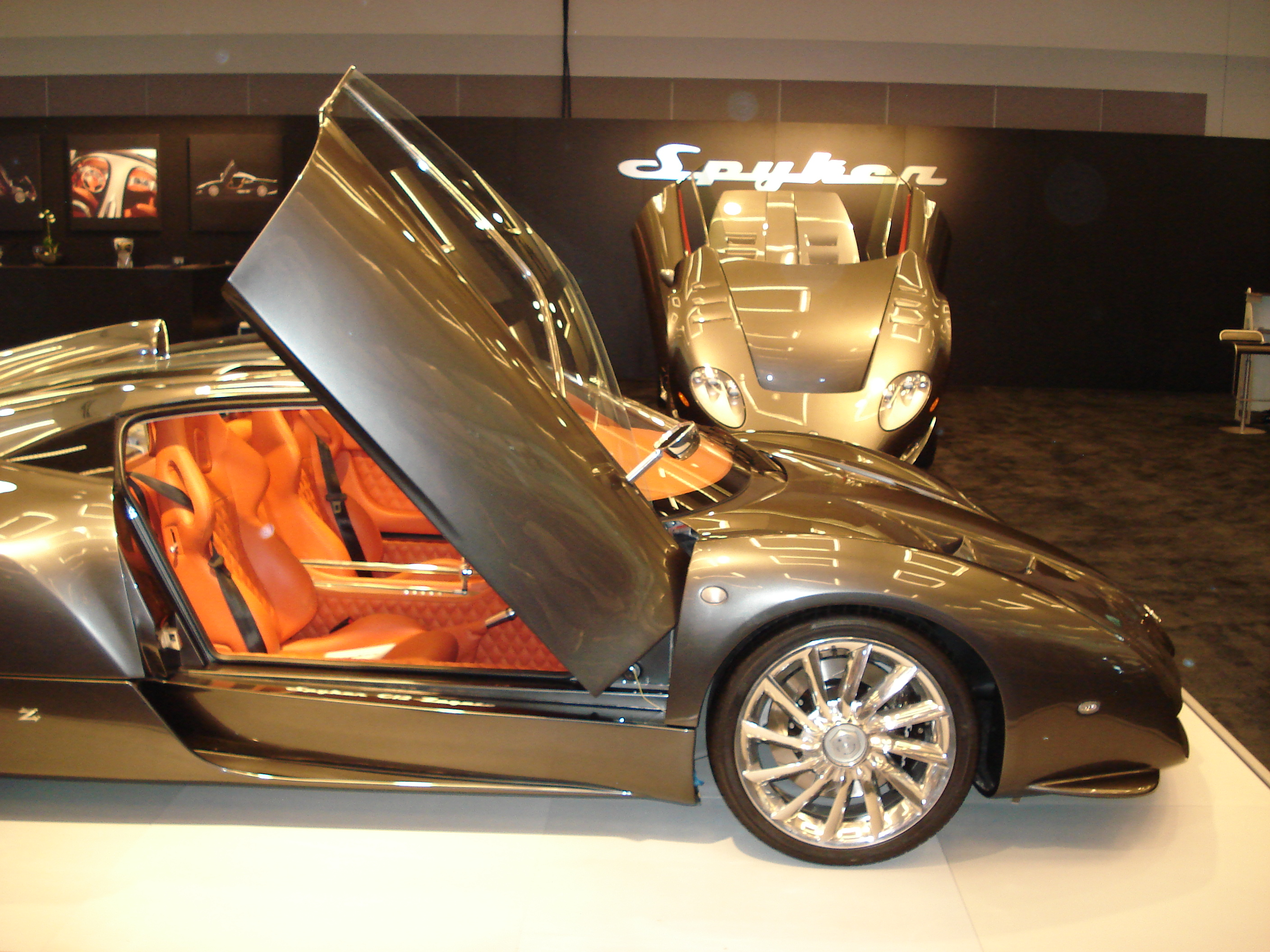
Spyker C12 Zagato at the 2007 Los Angeles Auto Show

On March 6, 2007, Spyker announced the C12 Zagato at the Salon International de l'Auto in Geneva. The Milanese design house Zagato co-designed the model. The C12 Zagato featured all-new design elements inspired by Formula One. Though the exterior styling is somewhat of a departure from the C8, it retained key features of the C8 such as the scissor doors, interior styling, and general aviation theme. The C12 Zagato is powered by a 6.0 L W12 engine sourced from VW Group (the same engine as featured in the Audi A8 and Volkswagen Phaeton). For the C12 Zagato, Spyker Cars have tuned the W12 to produce 500 PS. The C12 Zagato was to be offered with a choice of a 6-speed automatic gearbox with paddle-shifters or a traditional 6-speed manual. The Spyker C12 Zagato was priced at EUR 495,000 (approximately US$740,000 or £450,000), and Spyker planned to produce only 24 cars, with deliveries set to begin in early 2008. However, in July 2007, it was announced that C12 production was delayed, and a couple of months later in October announced that it was cancelled, as Spyker had decided to focus their resources on other models such as the C8 and the then-upcoming D8. Reportedly, only one prototype was built before production was cancelled.

== Performance ==
The C12 Zagato develops 493 hp (500 PS; 368 kW) and 610 N⋅m (450 lb⋅ft) from the specially-tuned W12 engine. With a KERB weight of 1,480 kg (3,263 lb), the Spyker will accelerate from 0 to 60 mph in 3.8 seconds, and then on to a top speed of 193 mph (311 km/h). Braking is accomplished by steel ventilated discs and features anti-lock braking.
