= Volkswagen Group W-12 engine =

Volkswagen-Audi/Bentley W12 engine
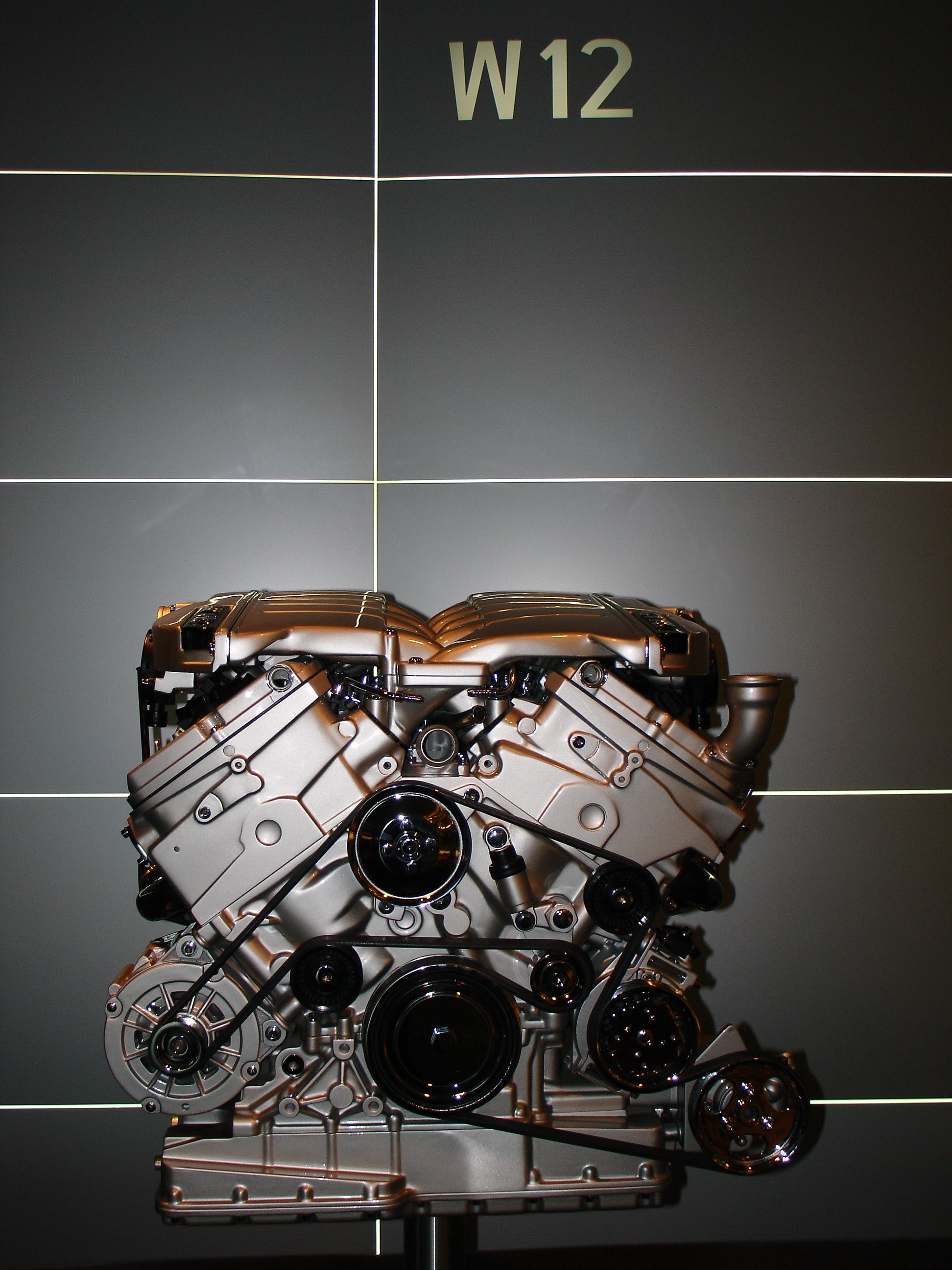

Overview
- Manufacturer: Volkswagen Group
- Production: 2001-April 2024

Layout
- Configuration: 72° W12
- Displacement: 6.0 L (5,998 cc), 6.0 L (5,952 cc)
- Cylinder bore: 84 mm (3.31 in)
- Piston stroke: 90.2 mm (3.55 in), 89.5 mm (3.52 in)
- Valvetrain: 48-valve, DOHC, four-valves per cylinder
- Compression ratio: 10.7:1

Combustion
- Turbocharger: Twin-turbocharged
- Fuel system: Fuel injection
- Fuel type: Gasoline
- Oil system: Dry sump - First Gen/Wet Sump - Post 2003

Output
- Power output: 414–700 hp (309–522 kW)
- Torque output: 405–750 lb⋅ft (549–1,017 N⋅m)

Dimensions
- Dry weight: 239 kg (527 lb)

Volkswagen Group have produced a number of W12 internal combustion piston engines for their Volkswagen, Audi, and Bentley marques, since 2001.

== Overview ==
The only mass-production W12 engine is the Volkswagen 6.0 WR12 48v, a four-bank design which was released in 2001. This engine has been used in several models from the brands Audi, Bentley, and Volkswagen, and in 2003 a turbocharged version was released.

The engine is constructed by mating two narrow-angle 15° VR6 engines at an inclined angle of 72°. The narrow angle of each set of cylinders allows just two overhead camshafts to drive each pair of banks, so the W12 engine has the same number of camshafts as a V12 engine. The W12 engine has a very compact design for a 12-cylinder engine, with the overall size of the 6.0 L (366 cu in) engine being smaller than Volkswagen's contemporary 4.2 L (256 cu in) V8 engine.

The first application of the Volkswagen W12 was the 2001 Volkswagen W12, a mid-engined concept car which set the 24‑hour world endurance record in 2001 with a distance of 7,085.7 kilometres (4,402.8 mi) and an average speed of 295 km/h (183 mph). The first production car to use the W12 engine was the 2001 Audi A8 (D2). Other cars to use the W12 engine are the 2005-present Bentley Continental Flying Spur, 2015–present, 2004-2011 Volkswagen Phaeton W12 and the 2005-2010 Volkswagen Touareg W12. The engine was also used in the 2006 Spyker C12 La Turbie and 2008 Spyker C12 Zagato low-volume sports cars.

== Variants ==
=== 6.0 WR12 48v ===
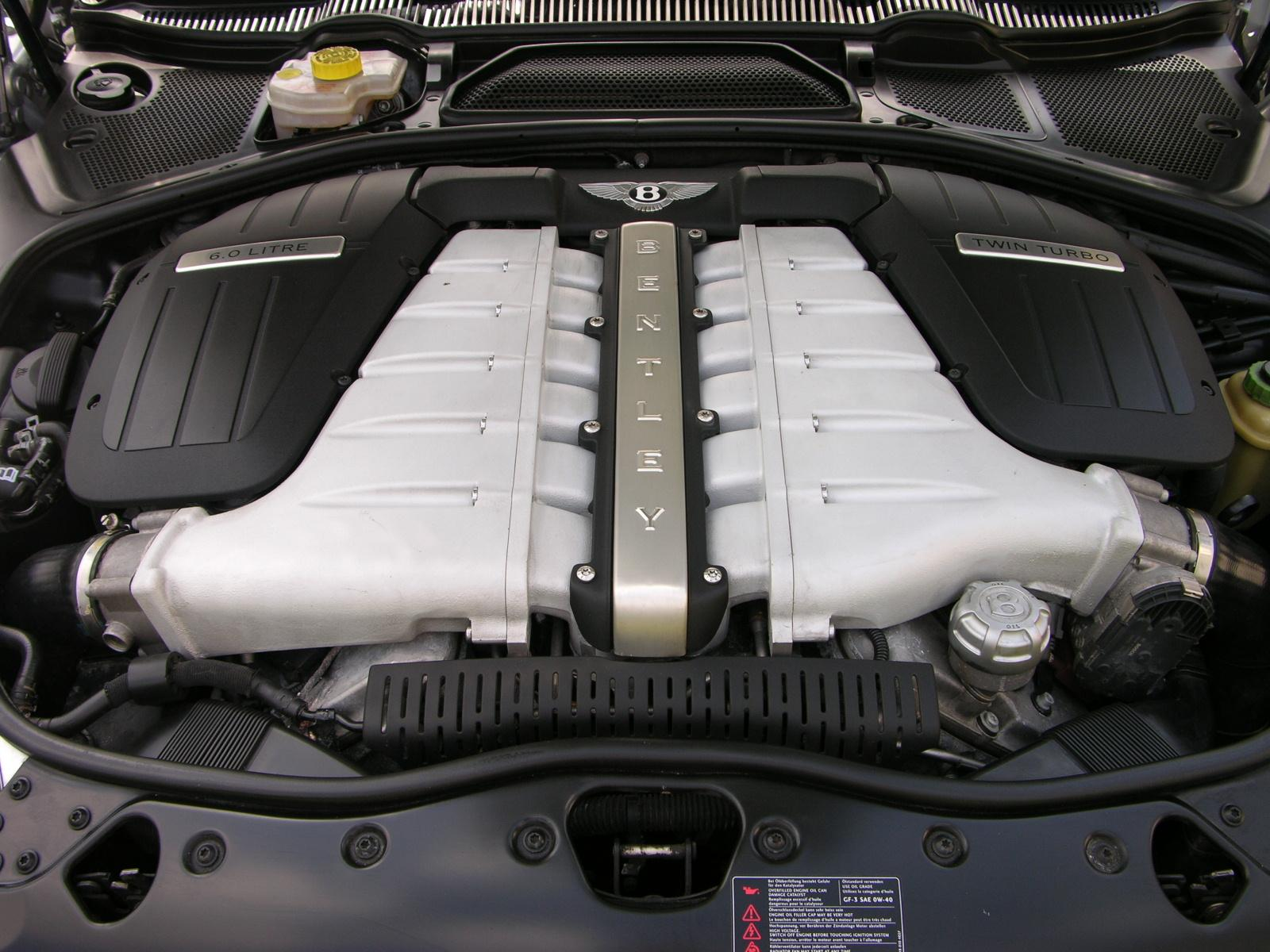
Bentley Continental GT W12 engine

This W12 badged W12 engine is twelve cylinder W engine of two rows of (staggered) 6 cylinders, formed by joining two imaginary 15° VR6 engine ('shortened inline-engine') cylinder blocks, placed on a single crankshaft, with each cylinder 'double-bank' now at a 72° angle.

This Volkswagen Group engine is also used with slight modification, and with the addition of two turbochargers in the Bentley Continental Flying Spur. It has also been used in a 600 hp (450 kW; 610 PS) form aboard the Volkswagen W12 prototype sports car to establish a 24-hour record of 323 km/h (200.7 mph) in 2002 at the Nardò Ring in Italy.

Identification
Parts code prefix: 07C:
Engine displacement & engine configuration
5,998 cc (366.0 cu in) 72° W12 engine; bore x stroke: 84.0 mm × 90.2 mm (3.31 in × 3.55 in), stroke ratio: 0.93:1 – undersquare/long-stroke, 499.9 cc per cylinder, compression ratio: 10.7:1: 5,952 cc (363.2 cu in) 72° W12 engine; bore x stroke: 84.0 mm × 89.5 mm (3.31 in × 3.52 in), stroke ratio: 0.93:1 – undersquare/long-stroke, 496 cc per cylinder, compression ratio: 10.7:1:
Cylinder block & crankcase
Homogeneous monoblock low-pressure chill die cast hypereutectic 'Alusil' aluminium-silicon alloy (AlSi_{17}Cu_{4}Mg); torsionally stiff aluminium alloy crankcase with high-resistance cylinder liners, simplex roller chain driven oil pump; die-forged steel 21.2 kg crankshaft, seven main bearings, crankpins offset to achieve a constant firing order as on a V6 engine:
Cylinder heads & valvetrain
Cast aluminium alloy; four valves per cylinder, 48 valves total, low-friction roller finger cam followers with automatic hydraulic valve clearance compensation, double overhead camshaft driven from the flywheel side via a two-stage chain drive utilising three 3/8" simplex roller chains, continuous vane-adjustable variable valve timing for intake and exhaust camshafts with up to 52 degrees timing range for the flow-optimised inlet ports, 22 degrees on the exhaust camshafts:
Aspiration
Two air filters, two hot-film air mass meters, two throttle bodies each with electronically controlled Bosch 'E-Gas' throttle valves, four-part two-channel cast magnesium alloy intake manifold; Bentley versions also use twin-turbos – one turbocharger per VR cylinder bank:
Fuel system, ignition system, engine management
Two linked common rail fuel distributor rails, multi-point electronic sequential indirect fuel injection with twelve intake manifold-sited fuel injectors; centrally positioned NGK longlife spark plugs, mapped direct ignition with 12 individual direct-acting single spark coils; Bosch Motronic ME 7.1.1 electronic engine control unit (ECU), cylinder-selective knock control via four knock sensors, permanent lambda control, water-cooled alternator:
Exhaust system
Two vacuum-controlled secondary air injection pumps for direct injection into exhaust ports to assist cold start operation, four exhaust manifolds with four integrated ceramic catalytic converters, eight heated oxygen sensors monitoring pre- and post catalyst exhaust gases:
Dimensions
Length: 513 mm (20.2 in): Height: 715 mm (28.1 in): Width: 710 mm (28.0 in), then 690 mm (27.2 in)
DIN-rated motive power & torque outputs – Audi / Volkswagen, ID codes
309 kW (420 PS; 414 bhp); 550 N⋅m (406 lbf⋅ft) — Audi A8: AZC (01/01-09/02), VW Phaeton: BAN (04/02-05/05)
331 kW (450 PS; 444 bhp) at 6,200 rpm, 580 N⋅m (430 lbf⋅ft) at 4,000 rpm, 560 N⋅m (413 lbf⋅ft) at 2,300–5,300 rpm — Audi A8: BHT, BSB, BTE (12/03-07/10)
331 kW (450 PS; 444 bhp) at 6,000 rpm; 560 N⋅m (413 lbf⋅ft) at 2,750–5,000 rpm — Phaeton: BRN, BTT (05/05-03/16)
331 kW (450 PS; 444 bhp) at 6,000 rpm; 600 N⋅m (443 lbf⋅ft) at 3,300 rpm — Touareg: BJN, CFRA (08/04-05/10)
DIN-rated motive power & torque outputs – Bentley twin turbo
412 kW (560 PS; 553 bhp) at 6,100 rpm; 650 N⋅m (479 lbf⋅ft) at 1,600–6,100 rpm — standard models: BWR, BEB, MTBHT
449 kW (610 PS; 602 bhp) at 6,000 rpm; 750 N⋅m (553 lbf⋅ft) at 1,700–5,600 rpm — "Speed" models: CKHC, BWRA
522 kW (710 PS; 700 bhp) at 5,900 rpm; 1,017 N⋅m (750 lbf⋅ft) at 2,050–4,500 rpm — "Supersports" model
Applications (5998cc)
Audi A8 (AZC: 03/01-09/02, BHT: 02/04-, BSB: 10/04-, BTE: 02/05-), Volkswagen Phaeton (BAN: 05/02-05/05, BRN: 05/05-10/08, BTT: 05/05-10/08), Volkswagen Touareg sport (BJN: 08/04-, CFRA: 02/08-), Bentley Continental GT, Bentley Continental Flying Spur:

==== Applications (5952cc) ====
Bentley Continental GT, Bentley Continental Flying Spur, Bentley Bentayga

==== 6.0 WR12 48v TFSI ====
This engine produces 430 kW (585 PS; 577 bhp) of power and 800 N⋅m (590 lbf⋅ft) of torque. It would mostly share the same technical specifications with its turbocharged 6.0-liter predecessor, other than the fact that it was modified to meet new WLTP emission standards. This new engine was promised to be made available on the fourth generation A8, following S8 and 60 TFSI/TDI models. However, as of August 2020, only examples of the W12 variant were press cars. It is rumoured that the W12 variant is only available as special orders in selected European dealerships.

=== 6.3 WR12 48v FSI (CEJA) (6299cc) ===
This engine has a cylinder bore of 86 mm and a cylinder stroke of 90.4 mm, for a precise displacement (to the nearest cc) of 6299 cc. It produces 500 PS (368 kW; 493 bhp) of power and 625 N⋅m (461 lbf⋅ft) of torque. This new engine was made available on the 3rd generation A8. It had more compact dimensions than a comparable V8 engine FSI direct injection with twin high-pressure fuel pumps, twin fuel rails, and six-port high-pressure injectors.

Applications
A8 L W12 6.3 FSI quattro (CEJA)

== Applications ==
- Volkswagen W12
- Audi A8
- Bentley Continental GT
- Bentley Flying Spur
- Bentley Bentayga
- Volkswagen Touareg W12
- Spyker C12 La Turbie
- Spyker C12 Zagato
- Volkswagen Phaeton
