= Porsche Engineering =

Engineering subsidiary

Porsche Engineering Group GmbH
- Type: Subsidiary
- Industry: Engineering services
- Founded: 2001
- Headquarters: Weissach, Germany
- Services: Vehicle engineering, software development and testing
- Number of employees: c. 2,000 (2026)
- Parent: Porsche AG
- Website: www.porscheengineering.com

Porsche Engineering (Porsche Engineering Group GmbH) was established in 2001 as a wholly owned subsidiary of Porsche AG, with headquarters in Weissach, and traces its history back to 1931 when Porsche created its first engineering office subsidiary. Porsche Engineering Group has been re-organized into Porsche Consulting (subsidiary of Porsche AG) and Porsche Engineering (subsidiary of Porsche SE).

Porsche Engineering has offered consultancy services to various other car manufacturers for many years including Audi, Mercedes-Benz, Opel, Studebaker, Lada, SEAT, and Zastava Automobiles. Since 2012 the company has managed the former FIAT owned Nardò Ring in Italy.

== Operations ==
Porsche Engineering develops and tests vehicles, components and software for Porsche and other customers. It is based at Porsche's development centre in Weissach, Germany, with additional teams in Bietigheim-Bissingen, Mönsheim, Leipzig and Wolfsburg.

The company opened its Prague office in 2001 and expanded to Ostrava in 2018. Work in Prague includes body and chassis engineering, computer simulation, electronics and software. The Ostrava teams develop software and integrate and test vehicle electronics. Both offices contributed to the Porsche Taycan's battery-management software, which calculates the battery's remaining charge and monitors its condition.

Porsche Engineering opened its first Romanian office in Cluj-Napoca in 2016, followed by Timișoara in 2021. Engineers at both locations work on driver-assistance systems, infotainment, connectivity and electric vehicles. Their work also includes artificial intelligence and data processing.

The Nardò Technical Center in southern Italy has been part of Porsche Engineering since 2012. The test centre covers 700 hectares and has 20 tracks and testing facilities, including a 12.6-kilometre high-speed ring. A battery testing centre opened in 2021, followed by a software development office in nearby Lecce in 2023.

The company's offices in Shanghai and Beijing develop vehicle technologies for the Chinese market, including automated driving and connectivity systems. In November 2025, the Shanghai operation became part of a shared research and development centre with Porsche's local Technical Division and Porsche Digital China.

== Selected projects ==
Project	Year(s)	Porsche's contribution
Studebaker Type 542	1952–1954	Four-door saloon prototype for Studebaker; never entered production.
TAG-Porsche Formula One engine	1983	Design and manufacture of McLaren's turbocharged V6 engine, funded by TAG.
SEAT Ibiza	1984	Joint development of the first Ibiza's petrol engines, marketed as "System Porsche".
Lada Samara	1984	Drivetrain engineering assistance.
Linde forklifts	1985 onwards	Industrial design of the 351 series and later models, including the driver's workspace and controls.
Škoda Favorit	1987	Assistance with engine mounts, front-axle geometry and cabin-noise reduction, with prototype testing at Weissach.
Mercedes-Benz 500 E	1990	Vehicle development and testing, body assembly and final assembly.
Audi RS2 Avant	1994	Joint development with Audi and assembly at Zuffenhausen.
Opel Zafira	1999	Body engineering and integration of the powertrain, chassis and electrical systems for the first-generation model.
Harley-Davidson V-Rod	2001	Joint development with Harley-Davidson of the liquid-cooled Revolution V-twin engine.
Scania truck cabs	2016	Cab structures developed jointly with Scania for its new truck range.
Aurus V8 engine	2018	Joint engine development with NAMI to NAMI's specifications.
Frauscher 850 Fantom Air	2023	Adaptation of Porsche Macan electric-drive components for marine use, including mechanical and electrical systems, control software and testing.
