= Nardò Ring =

Test track in Nardò, Italy

Coordinates: 40°19′38″N 17°49′34″E

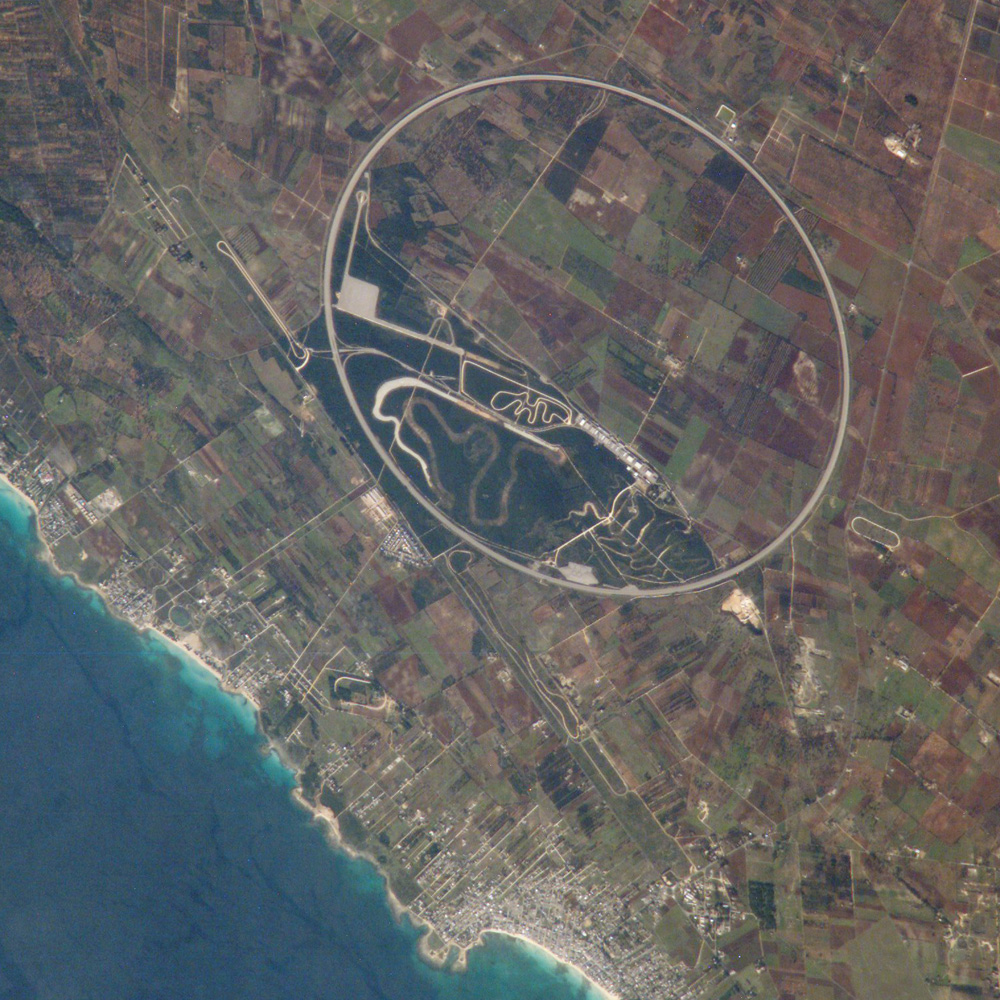
Space photograph of Nardò Ring. The image was taken from the ISS at an angle making it appear elliptical.

The Nardò Ring, originally known as Pista di prova di Nardò della Fiat (Fiat's Nardò test track) when it was built in 1975, is a high speed test track located at more than 23 kilometres (14 mi) north-west of the town of Nardò, Italy, in the southern region of Apulia, in the Province of Lecce. It was acquired by Porsche Engineering in 2012 from its former owners, Prototipo SpA. Porsche now calls the site Nardò Technical Center.

== Description ==
The track is 12.5 kilometres (7.8 mi) long and is round, has four lanes for cars and motorcycles totaling 16 metres (52 ft) in width and has a separate inner ring for trucks at a width of 9 metres (30 ft). In the cars/motorcycle ring the lanes are banked at such a degree that a driver in the outer most lane doesn't need to turn the wheel while driving at speeds of up to 240 km/h (149 mph). In essence, at the so-called neutral speed which is different for the four lanes, one can drive as if in a straight lane (The centripetal force required to drive in a circle is provided by the ground reaction force, which is angled away from vertical and therefore has a horizontal component pushing the vehicle into the turn).

Extremely fast cars still require the steering wheel to be turned when going faster than the neutral speed. For example, the Koenigsegg CCR which set a speed record for a production car at the Nardò Ring did so with the steering wheel at a 30° angle. This speed record has since been beaten by the Bugatti Veyron at Volkswagen Group's private Ehra-Lessien straight line test track in Germany, and hence the CCR only holds the speed record for the Nardò Ring. In the process of fighting a turn as needed when going faster than the neutral speed quite a bit of potential top speed is lost and hence a fast car will go faster in a straight line than what is possible on the Nardò Ring. Even at the neutral speed, in a banked turn a car runs a bit heavier than it would in a straight line, since the downforce created by the banking increases the rolling resistance on the tires.

The neutral speed for the four car/motorcycle lanes are:

- Lane 1 – 100 km/h (62 mph)
- Lane 2 – 140 km/h (87 mph)
- Lane 3 – 190 km/h (118 mph)
- Lane 4 – 240 km/h (149 mph)

During regular weekly working activity the maximum speed allowed on the circular track is 240 km/h (149 mph). Higher speeds are only allowed at times when a client gets the track for its exclusive use.

The neutral speed for the truck ring is between 80 km/h (50 mph) and 140 km/h (87 mph) over the width of the track, highest in the outer most part of the lane.

The plant also includes other tracks; the most important is 6.222-kilometre (3.866 mi) handling circuit, completely inside the circular one. It is characterised by a long main straight and sixteen curves of different radius and variable lateral slope. It can provide useful results for durability, reliability, vehicle dynamics and tire tests of both cars and motorbikes.

The track was featured in British TV series Top Gear in 1992, showing footage of the Jaguar XJ220, driven by Martin Brundle on a top speed test. It was again featured in the series 18 opener of the 2002 reboot format of Top Gear, when the then presenters of the show Jeremy Clarkson, Richard Hammond and James May drove in a Lamborghini Aventador, a Noble M600 and a McLaren MP4-12C, respectively, to see who could reach the highest speed. The rough surface of the track figured prominently in the latter episode, and it was resurfaced in 2018.

== Records set on the Nardò Ring ==
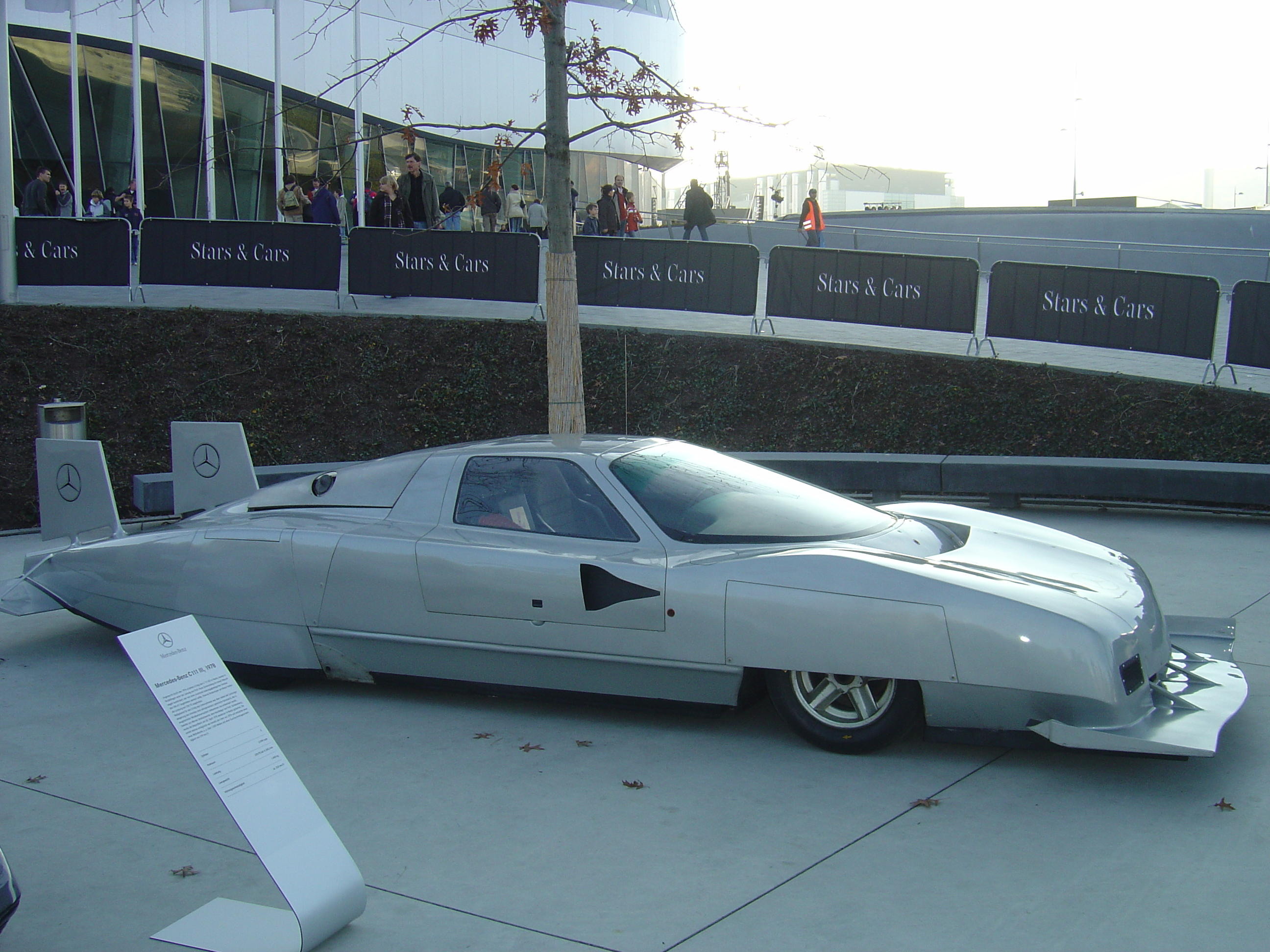
The Mercedes-Benz C111-IV that set the speed record in 1979

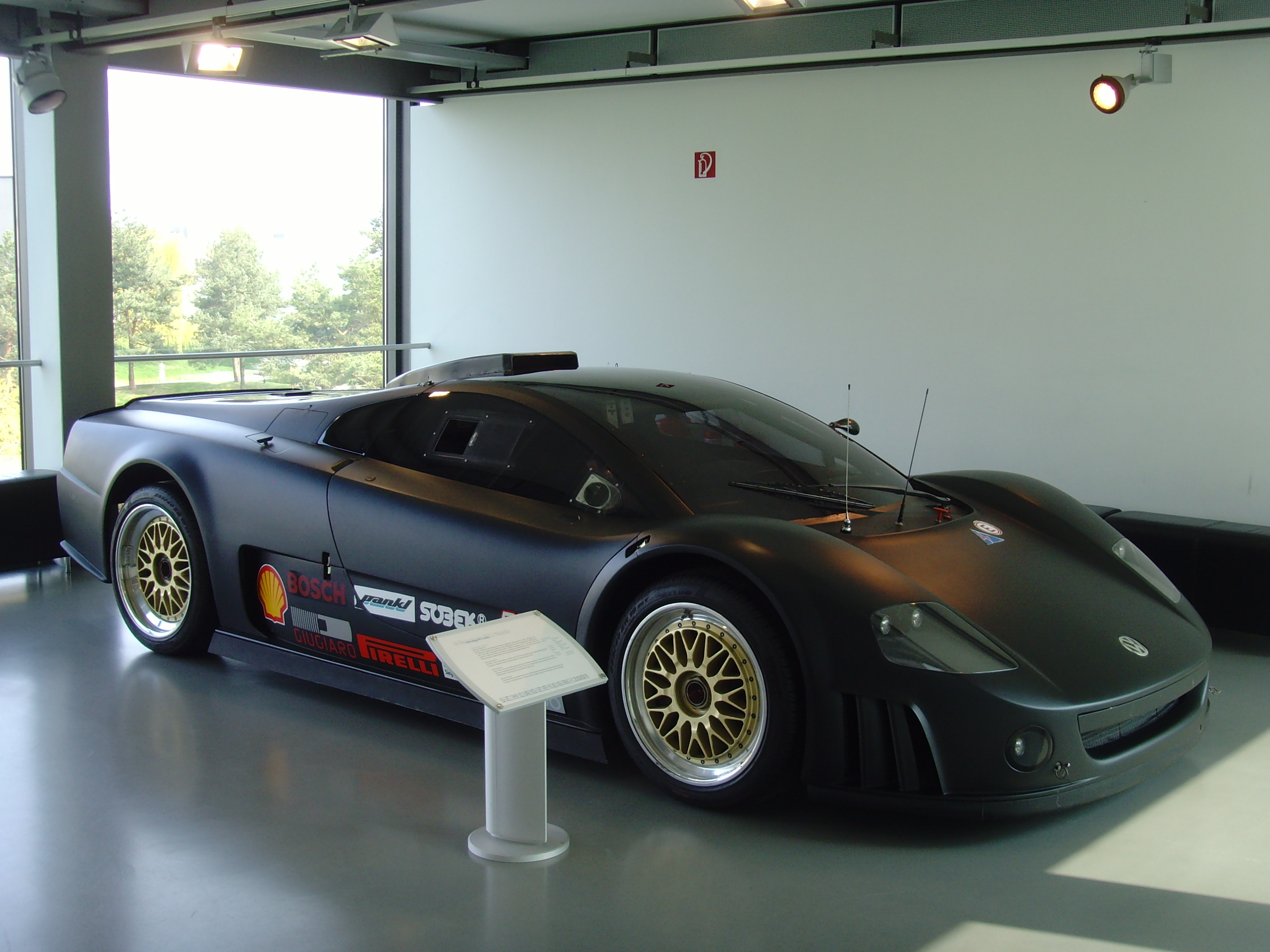
The Volkswagen Nardò that set the record on the Nardò ring. The record is still unbeaten today.

Near the track entrance there is a board showing some of the world records that have been established on the ring.

- On 13 May 1979 a 125cc Honda sets the 24-hour average speed world record: 137.866 km/h (85.666 mph)
- On 5 May 1979, a car broke 400 km/h (249 mph) for the first time, the Mercedes-Benz C111-IV reached a speed of 403.978 km/h (251.020 mph), establishing the Italian speed record. The car was able to complete a full ring lap in 1 minute and 57 seconds
- In 1980 the Volkswagen ARVW set the speed record for a diesel car reaching a speed of 362.07 km/h (224.98 mph)
- On 7 November 1982 a Porsche 928 S sets the 24-hour speed record, covering 6,033 kilometers at an average speed of 251.4 km/h (156.2 mph)
- On 28 November 1982 an Alfa Romeo Giulietta sets the average speed record over a distance of 50,000 kilometres (31,069 mi): 175.628 km/h (109.130 mph)
- Between 17 and 21 August 1983, three Mercedes-Benz 190E 2.3-16 cars set endurance records for 25,000 km (15,534 mi), 40,234 km (25,000 miles), 50,000 km (31,069 mi), the latter being run in 201 hours, 39 minutes and 43 seconds at an average 247.94 km/h (154.06 mph).
- On 14 September 1986, the Elf R prototype motorcycle set six world records, including an average speed of 243.572 km/h (151.349 mph) over 10 kilometres (6 miles) and a top speed of 321 km/h (199 mph)
- On 4 April 1988, an Audi 200 quattro set the world speed record on 500 miles (800 km) with an average speed of 324.509 km/h (201.641 mph) and on 1,000 kilometres (621 mi) at 326.403 km/h (202.817 mph)
- On 29 August 1993 a Honda NR 750cc ridden by Loris Capirossi set the world record for top speed 304.032 km/h (188.917 mph). The record is also established with a standing start on the kilometre at 299.825 km/h (186.303 mph) and on the 10 kilometres (6 mi) at 283.551 km/h (176.190 mph)
- In 1993 a Porsche 928 GTS beats the previous record covering in 24 hours 6,377.25 km (3,962.64 mi) at an average speed of 265.72 km/h (165.11 mph)
- On 2 June 1994, the Violent Violet electric motorcycle designed by engineer Fabio Fazi and driven by Max Biaggi set five world speed records for electric motorcycles: 1/4 mile (400 m), kilometre and mile from standstill, kilometre launched (164.498 km/h [102.214 mph]) and top speed of 168 km/h (104 mph)
- On 2 July 1994 a Bugatti EB110GT set a speed record for a methane-powered car, with road homologation, reaching a speed of 344.7 km/h (214.2 mph)
- In 1994 the Bertone Z.E.R. managed to set the speed record for an electric car on 1 kilometre (0.62 mi) by driving it at an average speed of 303.977 km/h (188.883 mph)
- On 27 August 1995 an Aprilia 250cc set the record on the kilometre launched with an average speed of 254.021 km/h (157.841 mph);
- On 3 June 2000, a Suzuki GSX 1300R set the world speed record on the running kilometre with 306.598 km/h (190.511 mph);
- On 16 February 2002, a production Lamborghini Murciélago set the average speed record over 1 hour at 305.041 km/h (189.544 mph) and over 161 kilometres (100 miles) at 320.254 km/h
- On 23 February 2002 a Volkswagen W12 also known as Volkswagen Nardò took the world record for all speed classes over 24 hours covering a distance of 7,740.576 kilometres (4,809.771 mi) at an average speed of 322.891 km/h (200.635 mph)
- In 2004, the Eliica electric concept car, featuring 8-wheel drive, reached a speed of 370 km/h (230 mph)
- On 28 February 2005 a Koenigsegg CCR, driven by Loris Bicocchi, set the speed record for a production car at 388 km/h (241 mph)
- On 25 May 2008 a Mercedes-Benz Truck Actros BlueTec III sets the efficiency record for a 40-tonne truck with an average consumption of 19.44 litres per 100 kilometres (5.1 km/L; 14.5 mpg_{‑imp}; 12.1 mpg_{‑US}) with a total distance traveled of 12,728 kilometres (7,909 mi)
- On 18 August 2019, a pre-series model of the electric Porsche Taycan covered the distance of 3,425 kilometres (2,128 mi) in 24 hours
- On 9 June 2023, a Triumph Tiger Explorer 1200 GT, driven by Iván Cervantes, covered the distance of 4,012.53 kilometres (2,493.27 mi) in 24 hours to claim the record for ‘The greatest distance on a motorcycle in 24 hours (individual)’.
- On 7 April 2024, a pre-series model of the electric Mercedes-Benz CLA covered the distance of 3,717 kilometres (2,310 mi) in 24 hours.
- In August of 2025, two battery electric Mercedes Concept AMG GT XX set a total of 25 World records after covering the distance of 24,901 miles (40,074 km) in under 8 days.

== Loris Bicocchi accident in the Bugatti Veyron prototype ==
During one of the first secret speed tests on a Bugatti Veyron prototype, driven by Loris Bicocchi, one of the wheels exploded carrying the fender with it. The fender raised and brought the front hood with it which collapsed and smashed the windshield, causing the car to lose control and slamming into the guard rail at a speed of 398 kilometres per hour (247 mph).

Although the car's brakes failed, Bicocchi managed to slow the car by scraping along the guardrail, escaping with only minor injuries.

Bicocchi received an invoice from the Nardò Technical Center where they said he damaged 1,800 metres (5,900 ft; 2,000 yd) of guardrail. Bugatti then took charge of the expenditure.

== See also ==
- Volkswagen Nardò
- Langhorne Speedway
