= Porsche 356 =

1948–1965 sports car

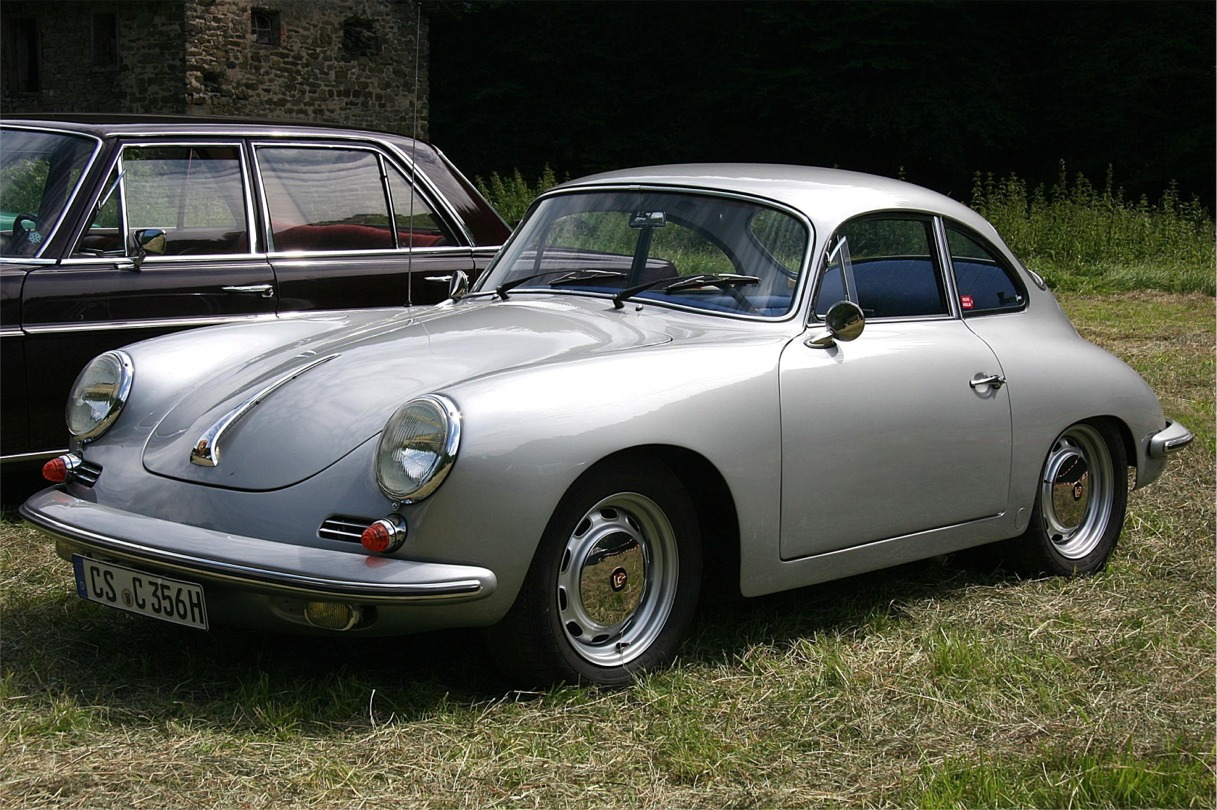
- Porsche 356 C coupé

Overview
- Manufacturer: Porsche Konstruktionen GesmbH (1948–1949); Dr. Ing. h. c. F. Porsche GmbH (1950–1965)
- Production: 1948–1965
- Assembly: Austria: Gmünd (1948–1949); Germany: Zuffenhausen (1950–1965)
- Designer: Ferry Porsche, Erwin Komenda

Body and chassis
- Class: Sports car
- Body style: 2-door coupé; 2-door convertible; 2-door roadster
- Layout: Rear-engine, rear-wheel-drive
- Related: Porsche 356/2; Volkswagen Beetle

Dimensions
- Wheelbase: 2,100 mm (82.7 in)
- Length: 3,870–4,010 mm (152.4–157.9 in)
- Width: 1,660 mm (65.4 in)
- Height: 1,220–1,320 mm (48.0–51.8 in)
- Curb weight: 771–1,041 kg (1,700–2,296 lb)

Chronology
- Successor: Porsche 911/912

The Porsche 356 is a rear-engine sports car, and the first-ever production Porsche model.

The 356 is a lightweight and nimble-handling, rear-engine, rear-wheel drive, two-door available both in hardtop coupé and open configurations. Engineering innovations continued during the years of manufacture, contributing to its motorsports success and popularity. Production started in 1948 at Gmünd, Austria, where Porsche built approximately 50 cars. In 1950, the factory relocated to Zuffenhausen, Germany, and general production of the 356 continued until April 1965, well after the replacement model 911 made its September 1964 debut. Of the 76,000 originally produced, approximately half survive. The 356 was first produced by Austrian company Porsche Konstruktionen GesmbH (1948–1949), and then by German company Dr. Ing. h. c. F. Porsche GmbH (1950–1965). It was Porsche's first production automobile. Earlier cars designed by the Austrian company include Cisitalia Grand Prix race car, the Volkswagen Beetle, and Auto Union Grand Prix cars.

The original price in 1948 for the 356 coupe was US$3,750 (equivalent to $50,300 in 2025) (official general USD inflation). The 356 cabriolet cost US$4,250 (equivalent to $57,000 in 2025).

== History ==
In 1948, the mid-engine, tubular chassis prototype Porsche 356/1 was completed. Although the prototype had a rear-mid engine placement, the production rear-engined 356 is considered by Porsche to be its first car.

Porsche 356 production
Type	Quantity
356 (1948–1955)	7,627
356 A (1955–1959)	21,045
356 B (1959–1963)	30,963
356 C (1963–1965/66)	16,678
Total	76,313

The 356 was created by Ferdinand "Ferry" Porsche (son of Ferdinand Porsche, founder of the German company), who founded the Austrian company with his sister, Louise. Like its cousin, the Volkswagen Beetle (which Ferdinand Porsche Sr. had designed), the 356 is a four-cylinder, air-cooled, rear-engine, rear-wheel-drive car with unitized pan and body construction. The chassis was a completely new design, as was the 356's body, designed by Porsche employee Erwin Komenda. At the same time, certain mechanical components, including the engine case and some suspension components, were based on and initially sourced from Volkswagen. Ferry Porsche described the thinking behind the development of the 356 in an interview with the editor of "Panorama", the PCA magazine, in September 1972. "...I had always driven very speedy cars. I had an Alfa Romeo, also a BMW, and others. ….By the end of the war, I had a Volkswagen Cabriolet with a supercharged engine, and that was the basic idea. I saw that if you had enough power in a small car, it is nicer to drive than if you have a big car which is also overpowered. And it is more fun. On this basic idea, we started the first Porsche prototype. To make the car lighter, to have an engine with more horsepower…that was the first two-seater that we built in Carinthia (Gmünd)".

The first 356 was road certified in Austria on June 8, 1948, and was entered in a race in Innsbruck, where it won its class. Porsche re-engineered and refined the car with a focus on performance. Volkswagen and Porsche shared fewer parts as the 1950s progressed. Porsche handcrafted the early 356 automobile bodies at Gmünd in aluminum, but when production moved to Zuffenhausen, Germany, in 1950, models produced there were steel-bodied. The aluminum-bodied cars from that very small company are what are now referred to as "prototypes". Porsche contracted Reutter to build the steel bodies and eventually bought the Reutter company in 1963. The Reutter company retained the seat manufacturing part of the business and changed its name to "Recaro".

Little noticed at its inception, mostly by a small number of auto racing enthusiasts, the first 356s sold primarily in Austria and Germany. It took Porsche two years, starting with the first prototype in 1948, to manufacture the first 50 automobiles. By the early 1950s, the 356 had gained some renown among enthusiasts on both sides of the Atlantic for its aerodynamics, handling, and excellent build quality. The class win at Le Mans in 1951 was a factor. It was common for owners to race the car as well as drive them on the streets. They introduced the four-cam racing "Carrera" engine, a totally new design and unique to Porsche sports cars, in late 1954. Increasing success with its racing and road cars brought Porsche orders for over 10,000 units in 1964, and, by the time 356 production ended in 1965, approximately 76,000 had been produced.

The 356 was built in four distinct series, the original ("pre-A"), followed by the 356 A, 356 B, and finally the 356 C. To distinguish among the major revisions of the model, 356s are generally classified into a few major groups. The 356 coupés and "cabriolets" (soft-tops) built through 1955 are readily identifiable by their split (1948 to 1952) or bent (centre-creased, 1953 to 1955) windscreens. In late 1955, the 356 A appeared, with a curved windshield. The A was the first road going Porsche to offer the Carrera four-cam engine as an option. In late 1959, the T5 356 B appeared; followed by the redesigned T6 series 356 B in 1962. The final version was the 356 C, little changed from the late T6 B cars but disc brakes replaced the drums.

Prior to the completion of 356 production, Porsche had developed a higher-revving 616/36 version of the 356's four-cylinder pushrod engine for installation in a new 912 model that commenced production in April 1965. Although the 912 used numerous 356 components, Porsche did not intend for the 912 to replace the 356.

When the decision was made to replace the 356, the 901 (later 911) was the road car designed to carry the Porsche name forward. The 912 was developed as the "standard version" of the 911 at the DM 17,500 price of a 356 1600 SC, while the complex but faster and heavier six-cylinder 911 was priced more than fifty percent higher. Customers purchased nearly 33,000 912 coupés and Targas powered by the Type 616 engine that had served Porsche so well during the 356 era.

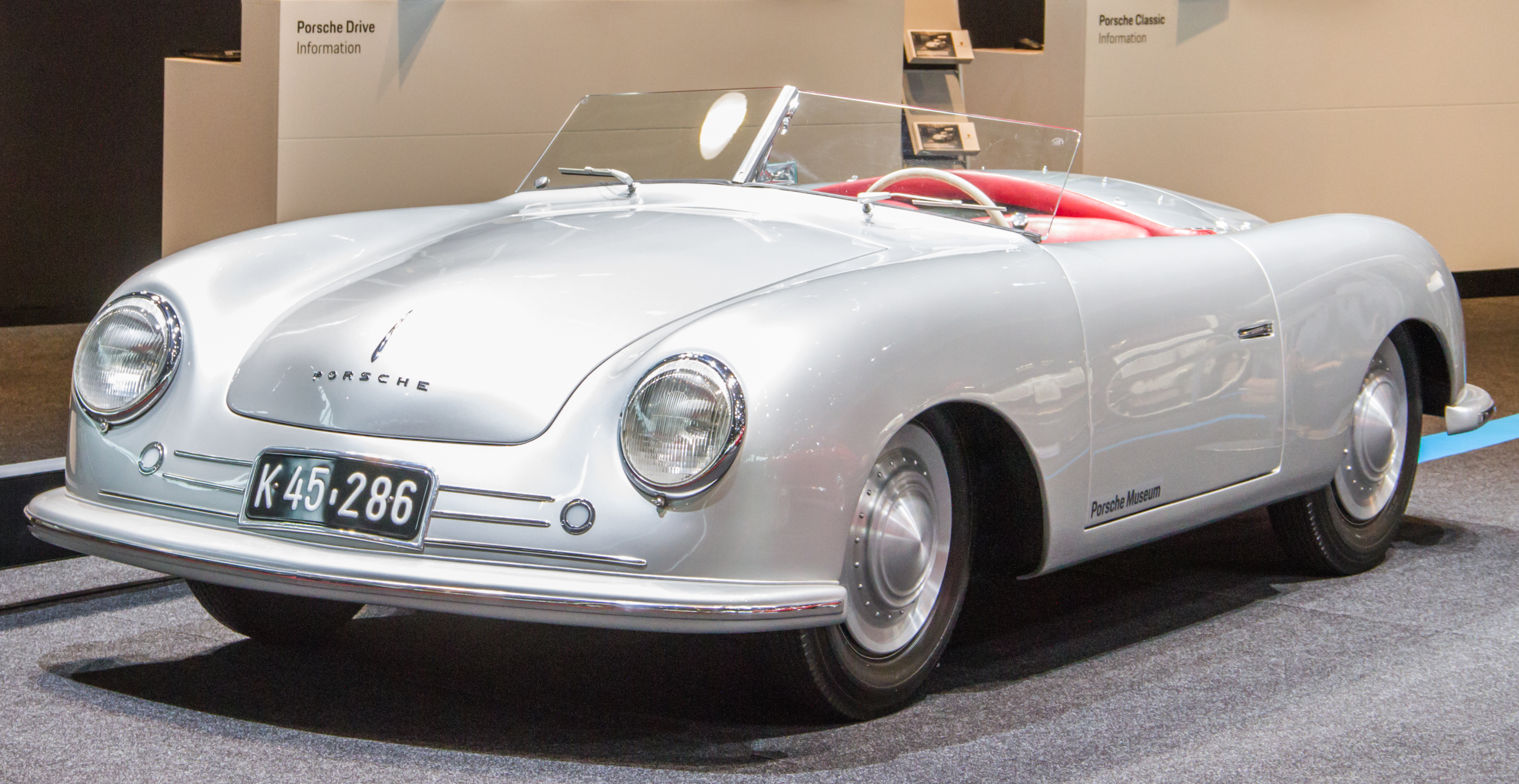
356 No. 1 – mid-engine prototype

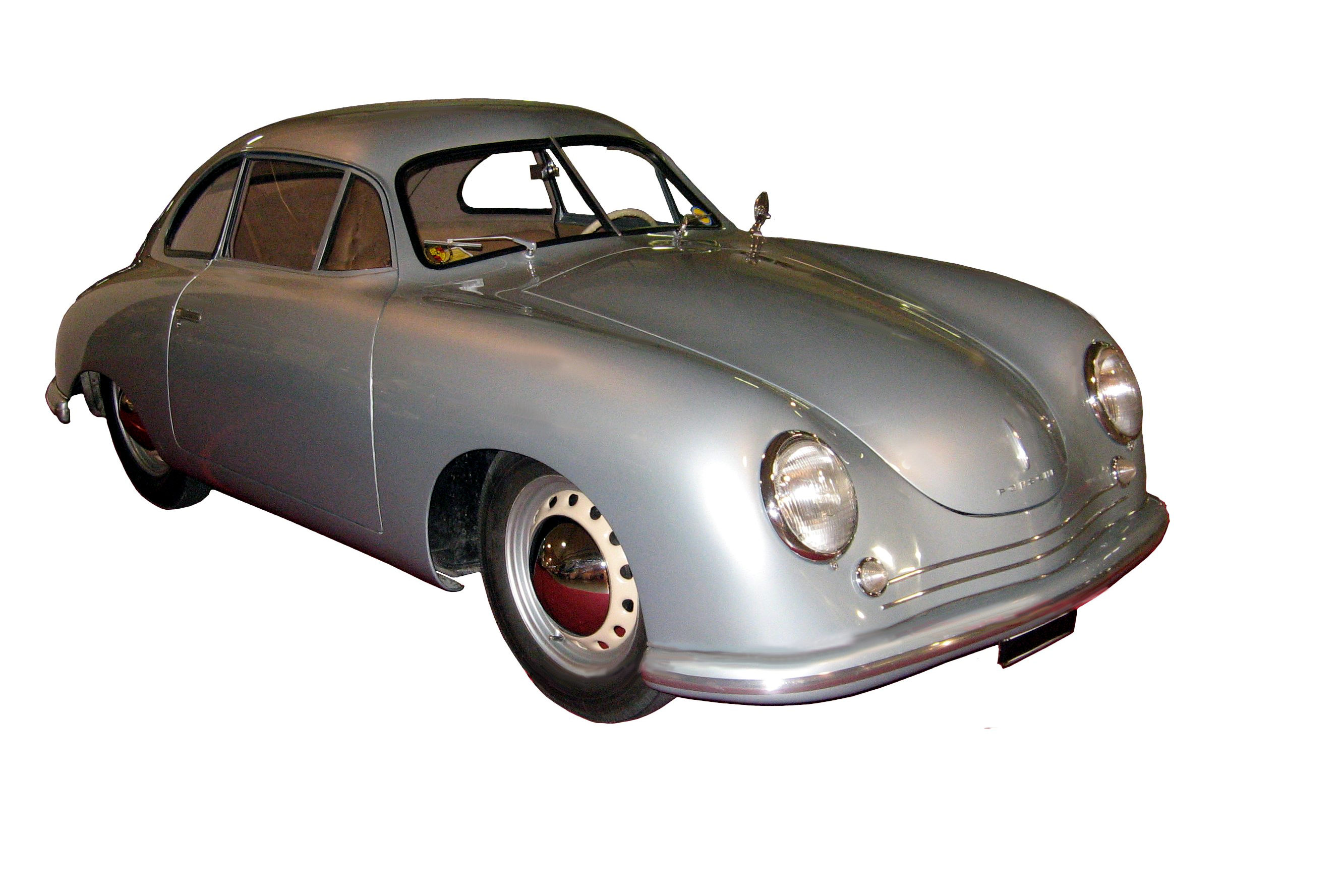
1948 coupé built in Gmünd

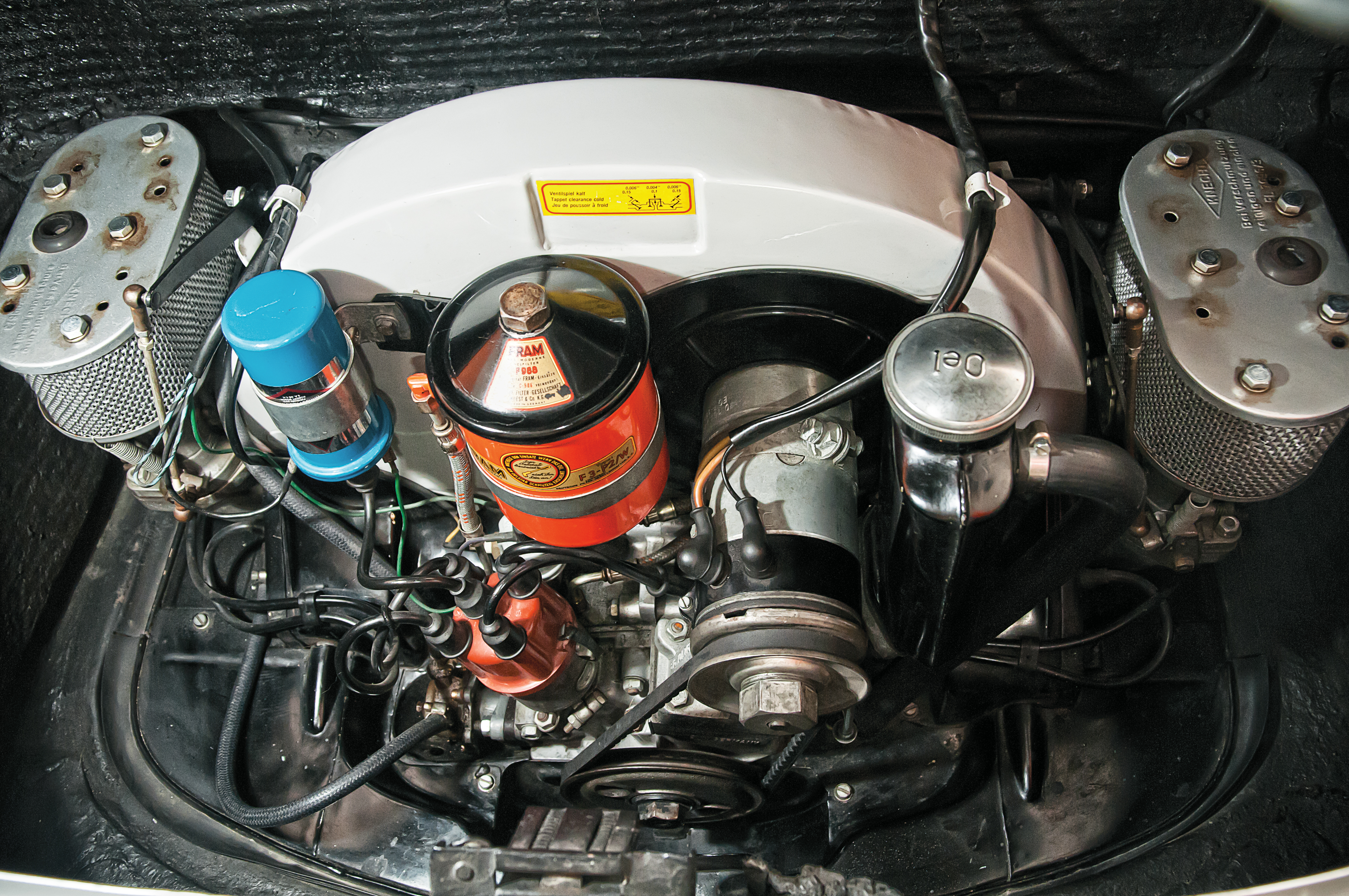
356 engine layout shows VW ancestry

== Models ==
=== 356 "pre-A" ===
Porsche 356
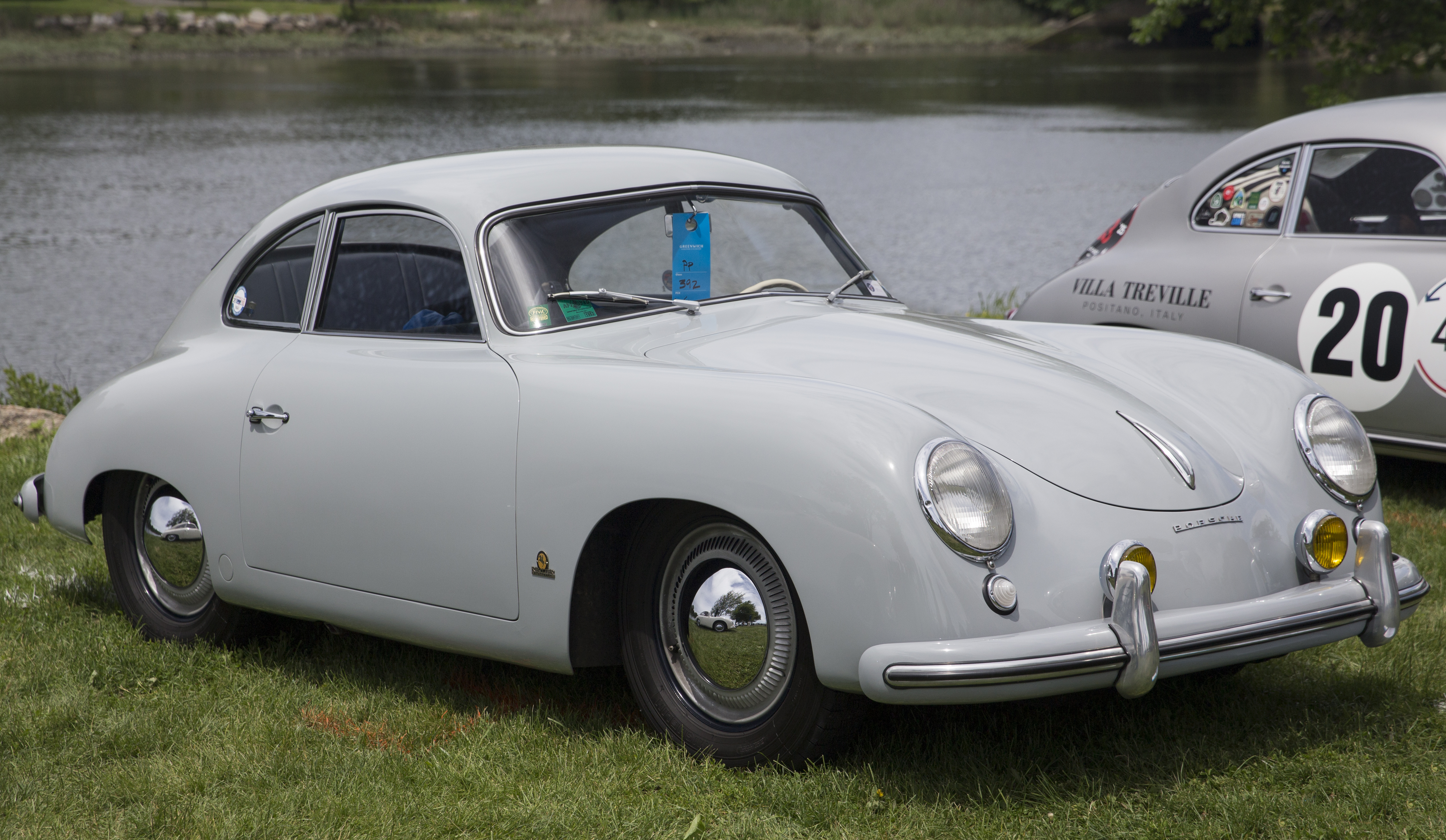
- 1953 Porsche 356, with the V-shaped windshield

Overview
- Production: 1948–1955

Powertrain
- Engine: 1.1 L Type 369 B4 (1948–1953, 1100); 1.3 L Type 506 B4 (1300); 1.3 L Type 506/1 B4 (1300 A); 1.3 L Type 589 B4 (1953–1954, 1300 S); 1.5 L Type 527 B4 (1951–1952, 1500); 1.5 L Type 528 B4 (1952–1953, 1500 S); 1.5 L Type 528/2 B4 (1954–1955, 1500 S); 1.5 L Type 546 B4 (1952–1953, 1500); 1.5 L Type 546/2 B4 (1954–1955, 1500)
- Transmission: four-speed manual

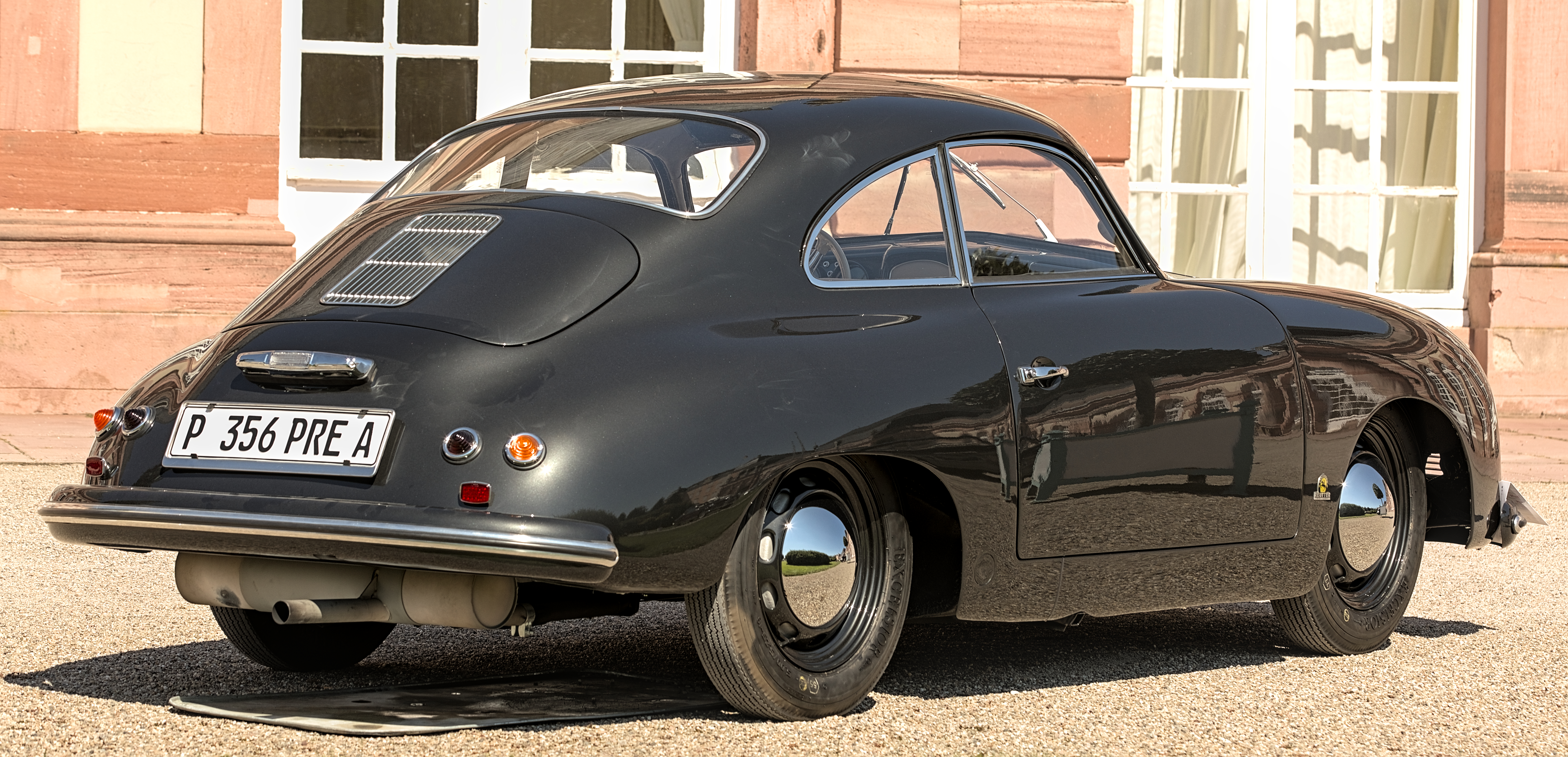
Porsche 356 "pre-A" coupé rear

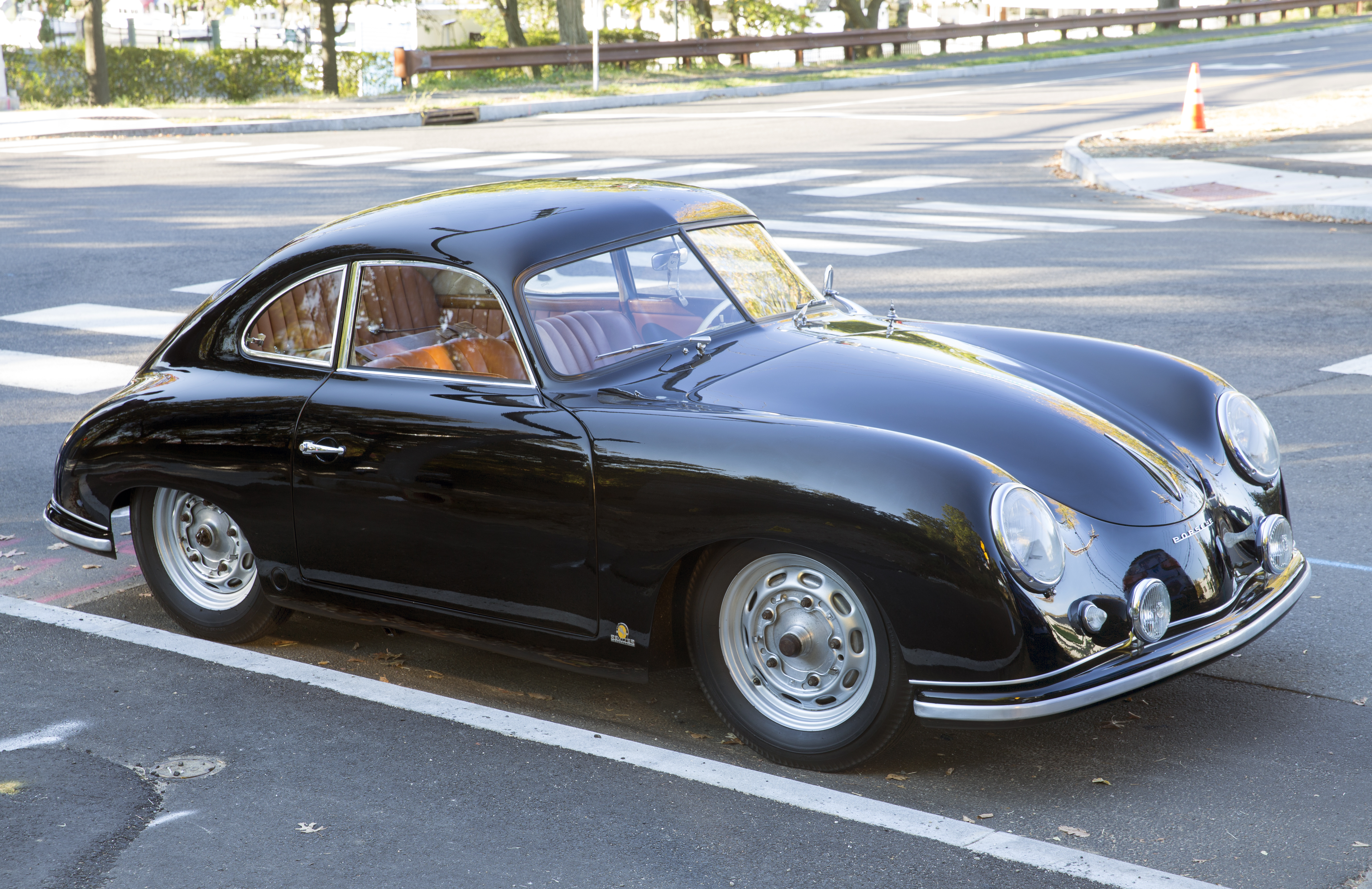
1952 Porsche 356 1500 Super "pre-A" coupé; early version still fitted with the split windscreen

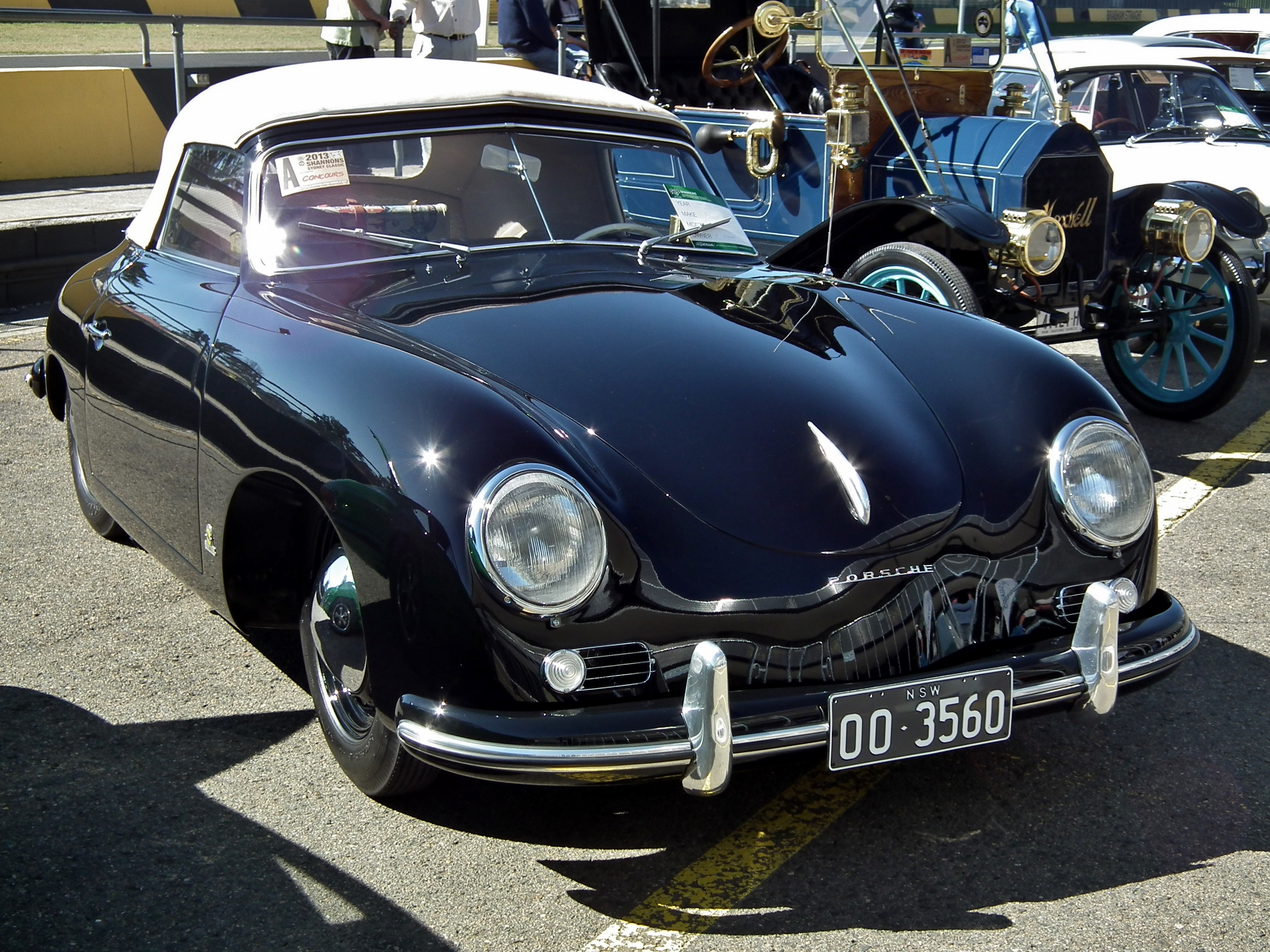
1954, 356 Cabriolet

From the earliest, 1,100 cc Gmünd beginnings, the overall shape of the 356 remained more or less set. In 1951, 1,300 and 1,500 cc engines with considerably more power were introduced. In April 1952, the split windscreen was replaced by a slightly V-shaped, single windshield, which fit into the same shape opening. In 1953, the 1300 S or "Super" was introduced, and the 1,100 cc engine was dropped.

In late 1954, Max Hoffman, the sole US importer of Porsches, convinced Porsche to build a stripped down roadster version with minimal equipment and a cut-down windscreen.

Towards the end of the original 356's time (in 1955, when the 356 A was about to be introduced), Hoffman, wanting a model name rather than just a number, got the factory to use the name "Continental" which was applied mostly to cars sold in the United States. Ford, makers of the soon-to-be-presented Continental Mark II and owners of the naming rights, objected. This name was used only in 1955 and today this version is especially valued. For 1956, the equivalent version was briefly sold as the "European", in order to use up a batch of front fenders with pre-punched holes for a script logo to be installed. Today, all of the earliest Porsches are highly coveted by collectors and enthusiasts worldwide, based on their design, reliability and sporting performance.

The M422 Mighty Mite, a military light utility vehicle built for the United States Marine Corps, originally used the engine from the 1300 S, but the production M422 had to use a different engine due to regulations requiring US-built equipment in US military vehicles.

=== 356 A ===
Porsche 356 A
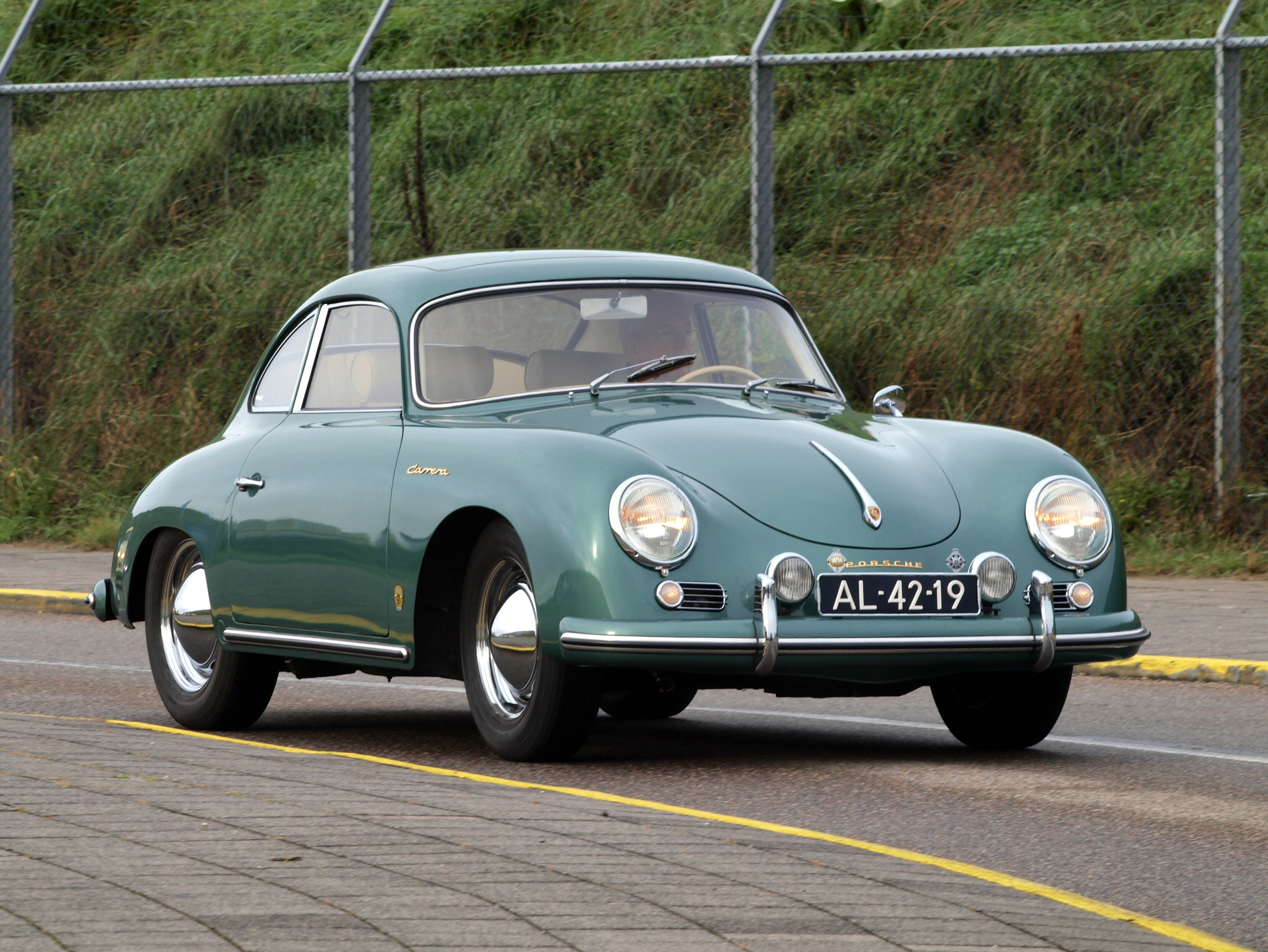

Overview
- Production: 1955–1959

Powertrain
- Engine: 1.3 L Type 506 B4 (1300); 1.3 L Type 506/2 B4 (1300 S); 1.5 L Type 547/1 B4 (Carrera 1500 GS/GT, 1955–1959); 1.5 L Type 692/0 B4 (Carrera 1500 GT, 1958); 1.5 L Type 692/1 B4 (Carrera 1500 GT, 1958); 1.6 L Type 616/1 B4 (1600); 1.6 L Type 616/2 B4 (1600 S); 1.6 L Type 692/2 B4 (Carrera 1600 GS)
- Transmission: four-speed manual

In late 1955, with numerous small but significant changes, the 356 A was introduced. Its internal factory designation, "Type 1", gave rise to its nickname "T1" among enthusiasts. In the US, 1,200 early 356s had been badged as the "Continental" and then a further 156 from autumn 1955 to January 1956 as an even rarer T1 "European" variant after which it reverted to its numerical 356 designation. In early 1957, a second revision of the 356 A was produced, known as Type 2 (or T2). Production of the Speedster peaked at 1,171 cars in 1957 and then started to decline. The four-cam "Carrera" engine, initially available only in the spyder race cars, became an available option starting with the 356 A.

Within the last 25 years, replicas of the 356 A have become very popular.

The most typical engine was a 1,582 cc (1.6 L; 96.5 cu in) 4-cylinder boxer, which was air-cooled, naturally aspirated with dual downdraft Zenith carburetors, had a 2 valve per cylinder OHV valvetrain, and produced 60 PS (59 hp; 44 kW) at 4,500 rpm and a maximum torque of 110 N⋅m (81 lb⋅ft; 11 kg⋅m) at 2,800 rpm.

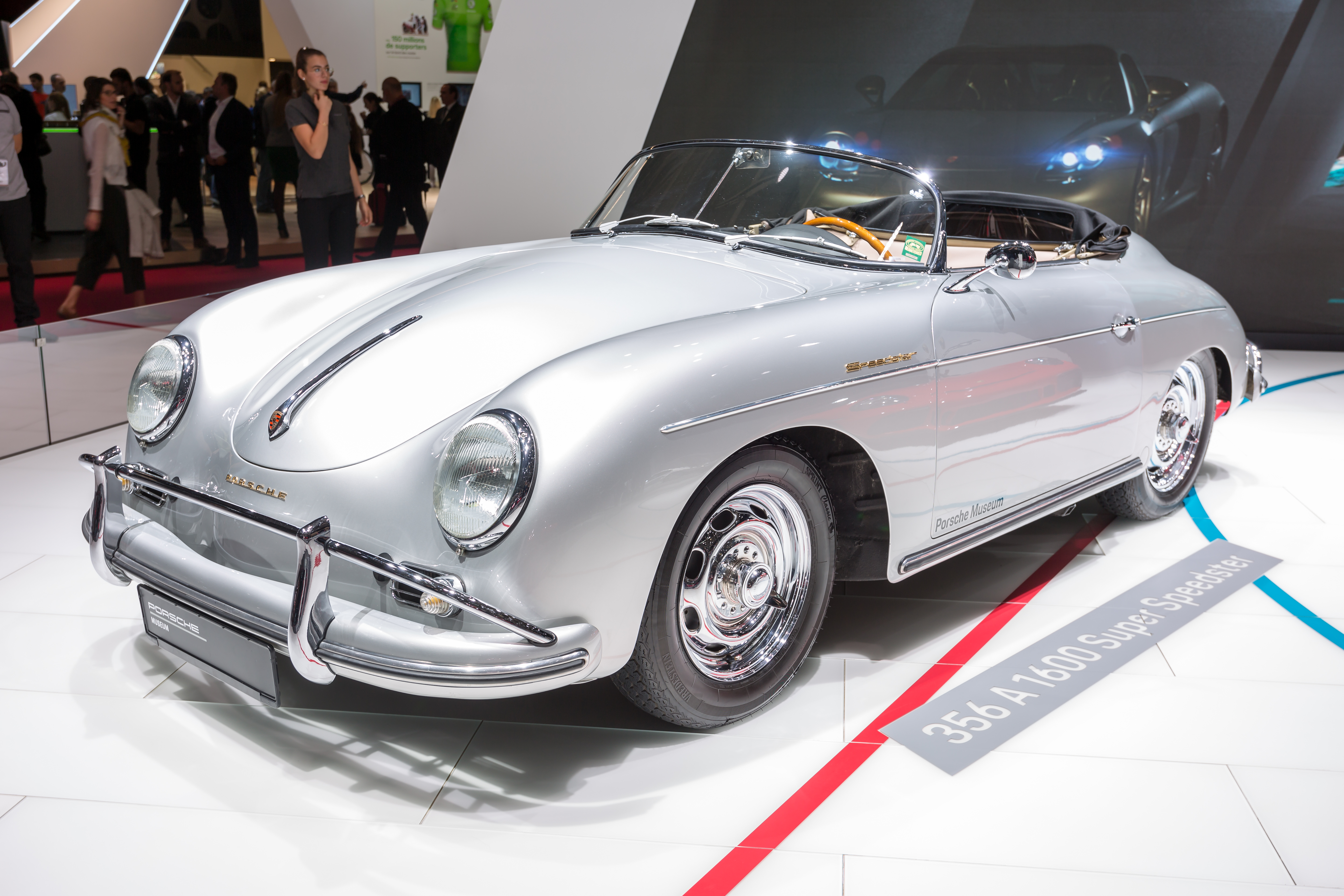
356 Speedster

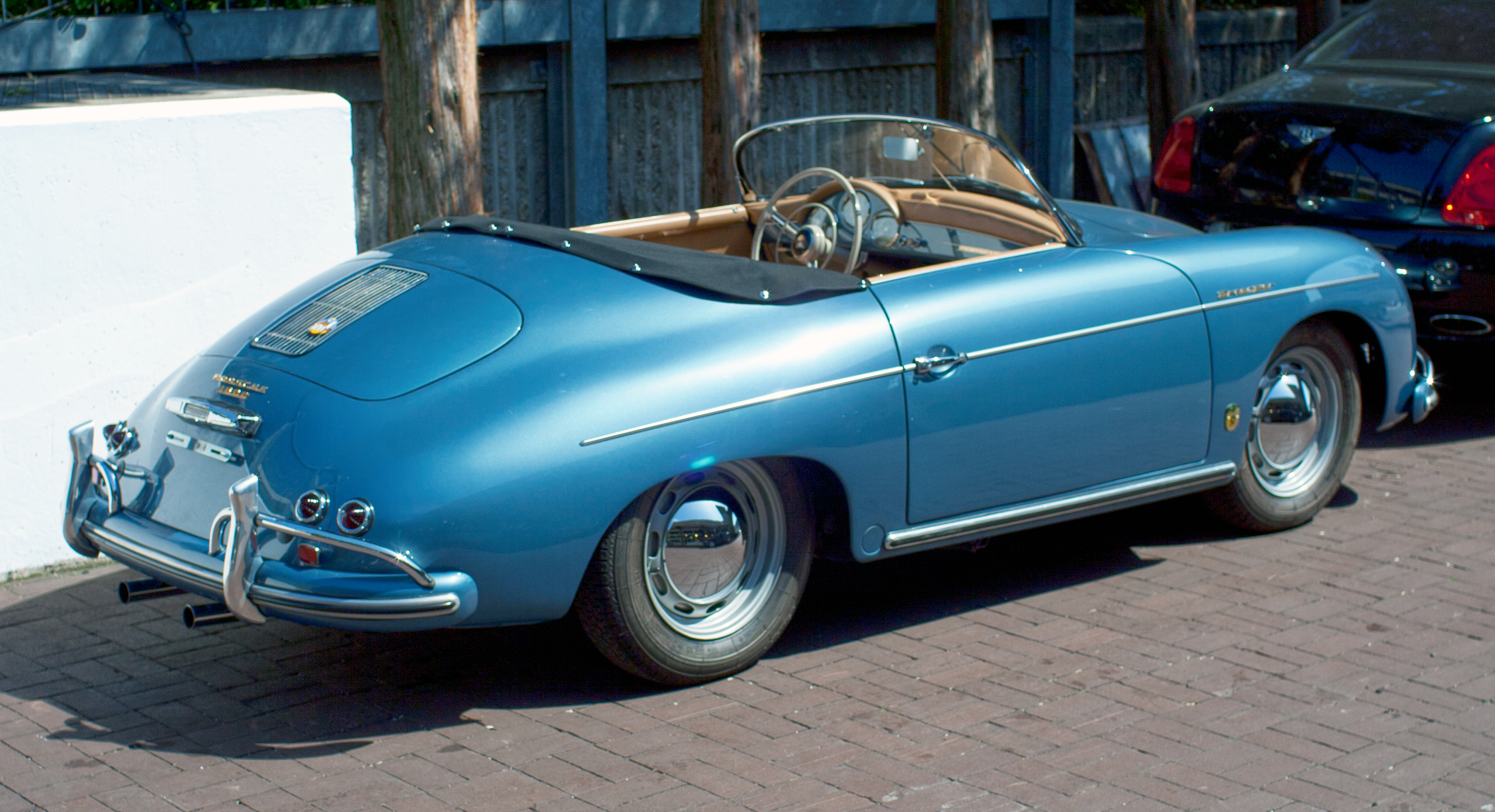
1957 356 Speedster rear

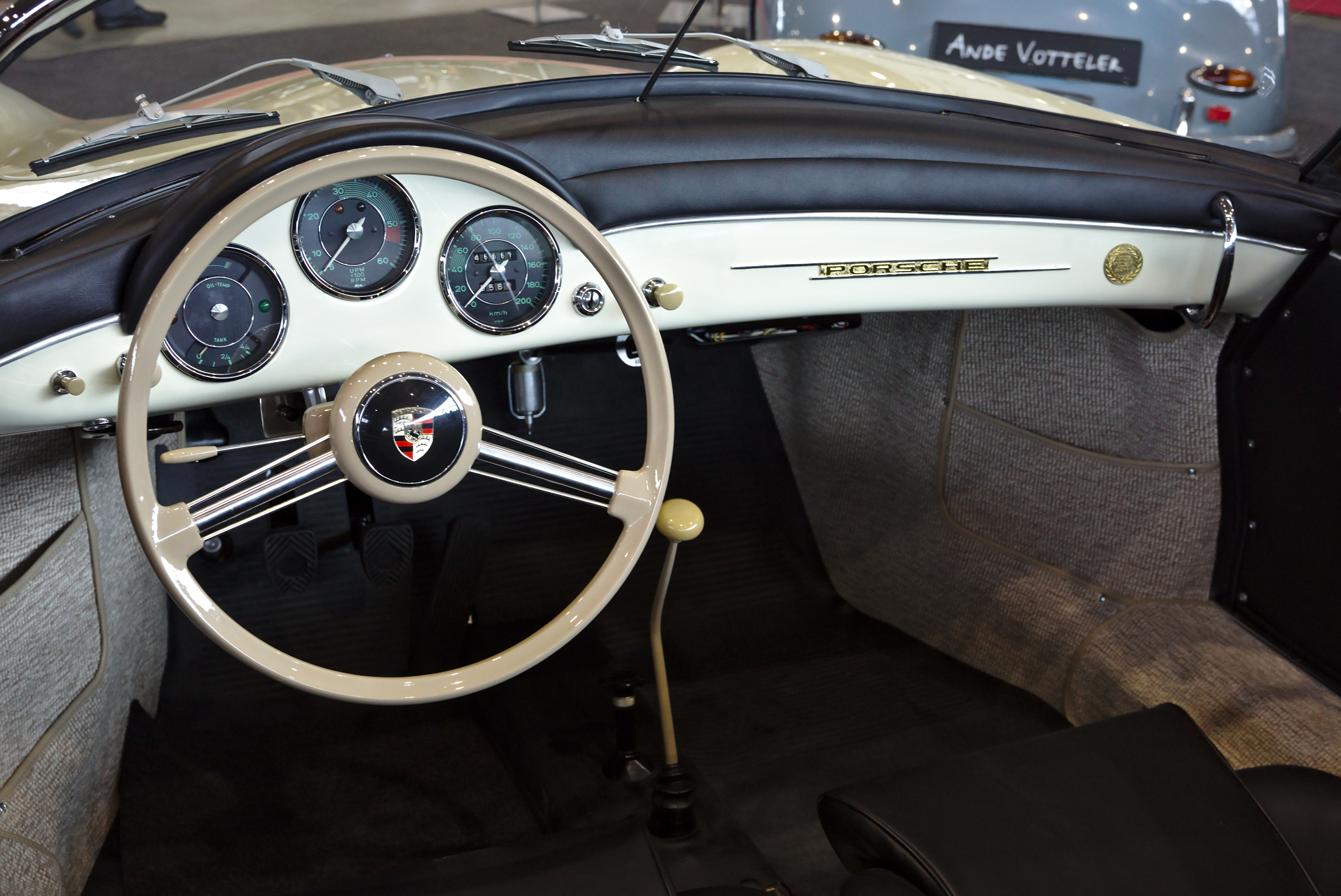
356 A Speedster interior

=== 356 B ===
Porsche 356 B
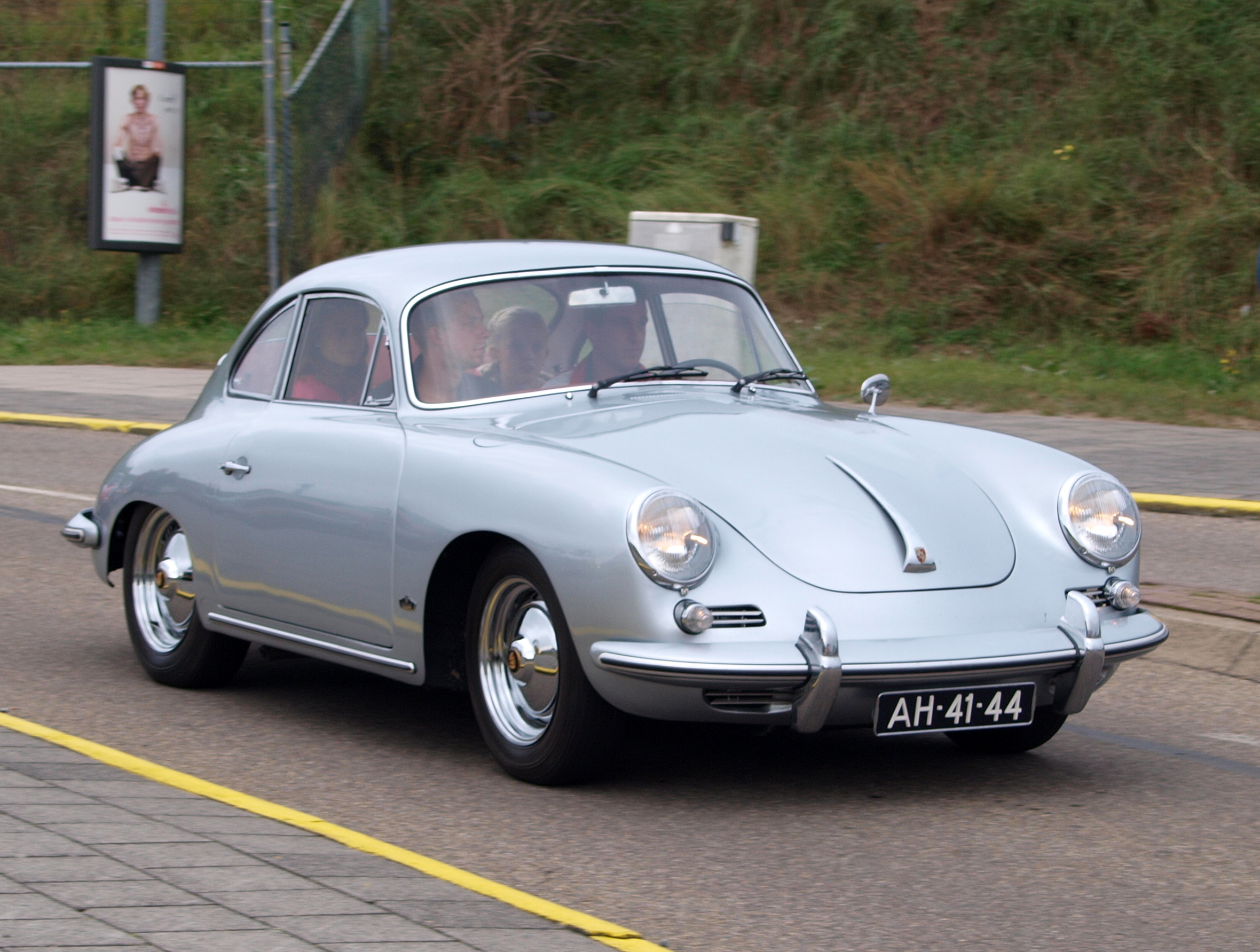

Overview
- Production: 1960–1963

Powertrain
- Engine: 1.6 L Type 616/1 B4 (1600); 1.6 L Type 616/2 B4 (1600 S, 1960–1962); 1.6 L Type 616/7 B4 (1600 Super 90); 1.6 L Type 616/12 B4 (1600 S, 1962–1963); 1.6 L Type 692/3 B4 (1600 Carrera GS GT, 1960); 1.6 L Type 692/3A B4 (1600 Carrera GS GT, 1961); 2.0 L Type 587/1 B4 (Carrera 2 GS)
- Transmission: four-speed manual

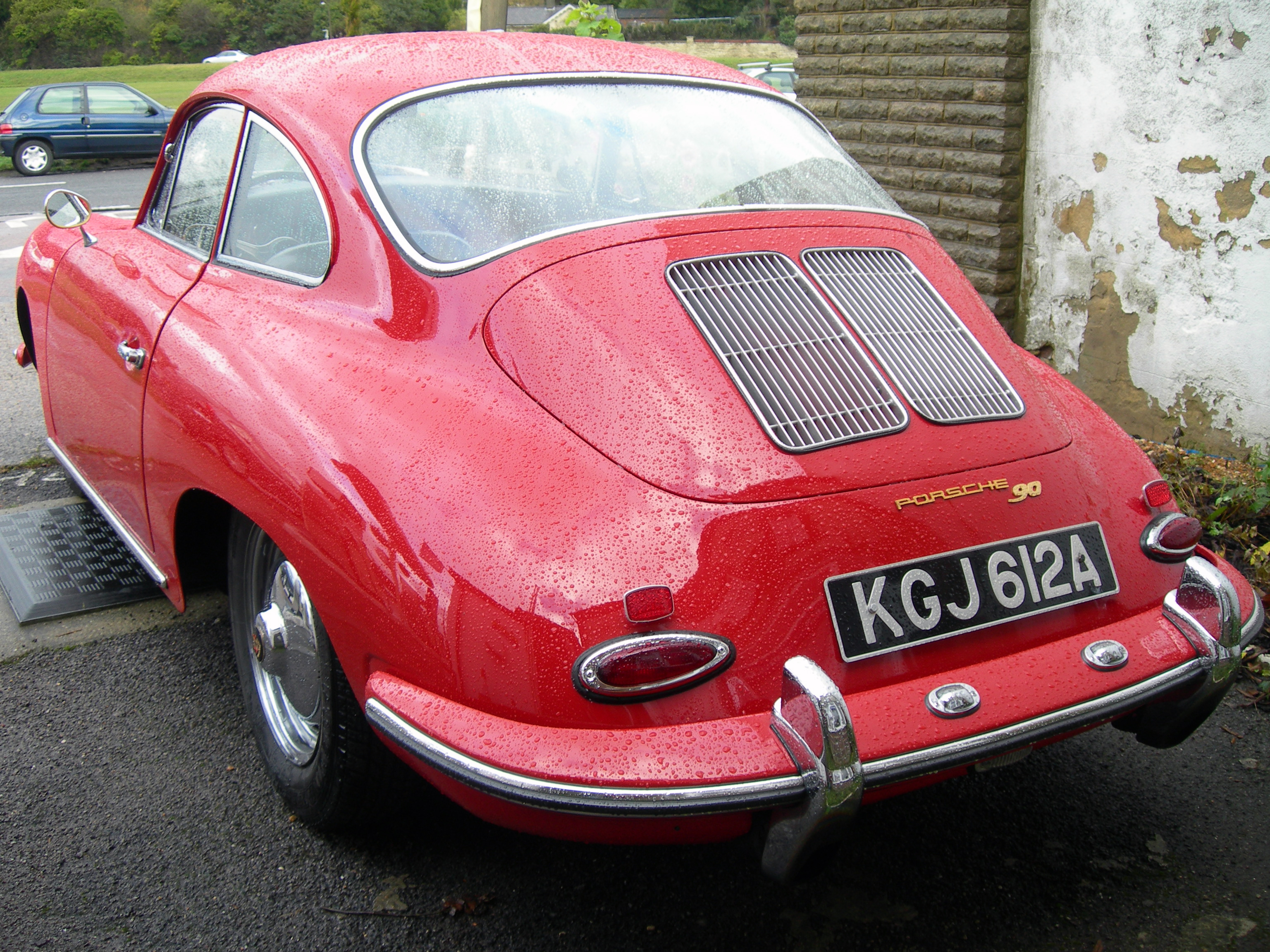
1963 Porsche 356 B 90 coupé (T6, with twin grilles on the engine cover)

In late 1959, significant styling and technical refinements gave rise to the 356 B (a T5 body type). The mid-1962 356 B model was changed to the T6 body type (twin grilles on the engine compartment cover, an external fuel filler in the right front wing/fender and a larger rear window in the coupé). Porsche did not draw attention to these (quite visible) changes, initially keeping the same model designation. However, when the T6 got disc brakes, with no other visible alterations, they called it the model C, or the SC when it had the optional, more powerful engine. A unique "Karmann hardtop" or "notchback" 356 B model was produced in 1961 and 1962. The 1961 production run (T5) was essentially a cabriolet body with the optional steel cabriolet hardtop welded in place. The 1962 line (T6 production) was a very different design in that the new T6 notchback coupé body did not start life as a cabriolet, but with its own production design. In essence, it had the cabriolet rear end design, the T6 coupé windshield frame and a unique hard top. Both years of these models have taken the name "Karmann notchback".

=== 356 C ===
Porsche 356 C
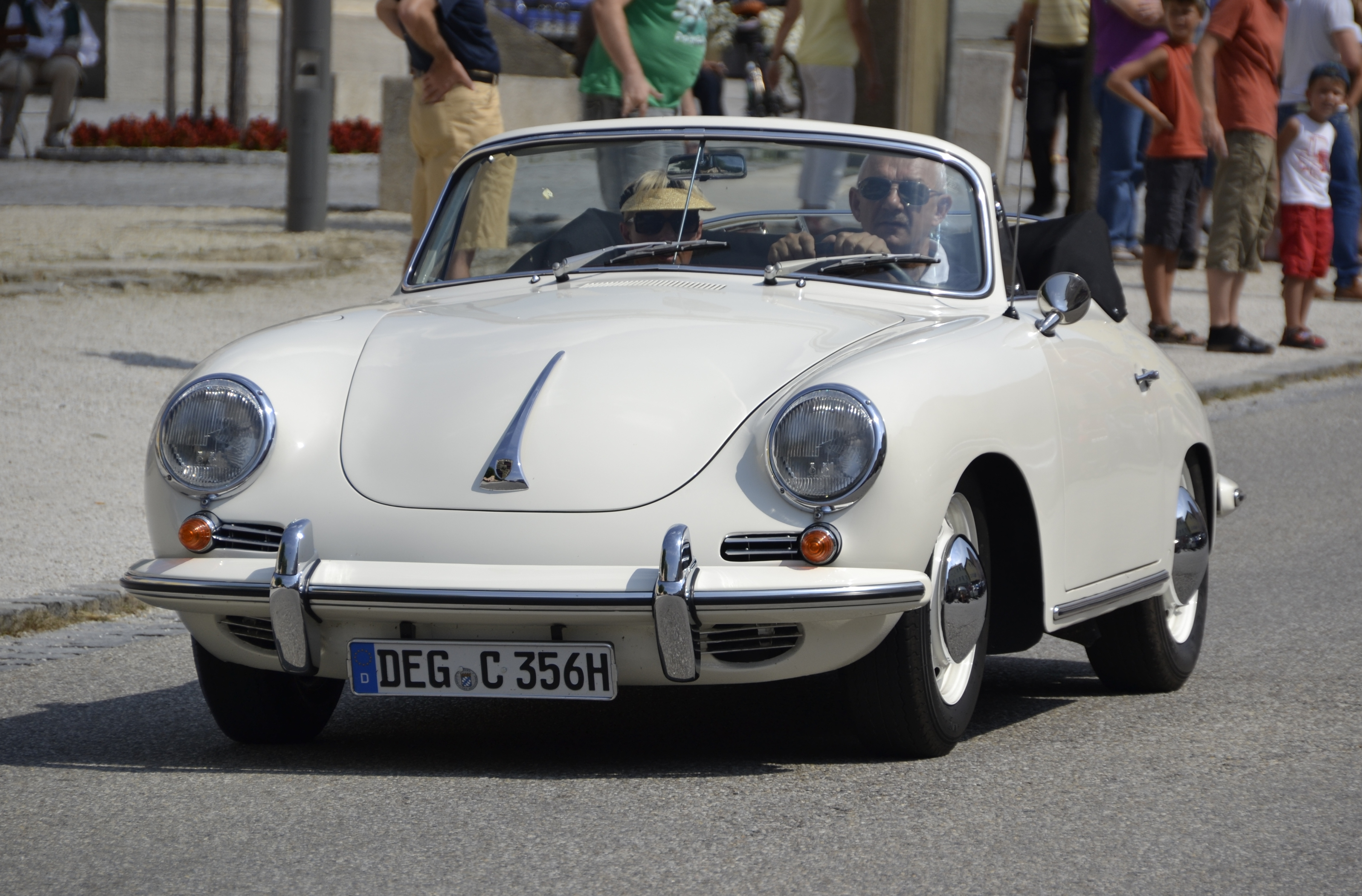
- Porsche 356 C cabriolet

Overview
- Production: 1964–1965

Powertrain
- Engine: 1.6 L Type 616/15 B4 (1600 C); 1.6 L Type 616/16 B4 (1600 SC); 1.6 L Type 616/26 B4 (1600 SC, police car); 2.0 L Type 587/1 B4 (Carrera 2); 2.0 L Type 587/2 B4 (Carrera 2)
- Transmission: four-speed manual

The last revision of the 356 was the 356 C introduced for the 1964 model year. It featured disc brakes all around, radial Pirelli Cinturato tyres, as well as an option for the most powerful pushrod engine Porsche had ever produced, the 95 hp (71 kW) "SC". Production of the 356 peaked at 14,151 cars in 1964, the year that its successor, the new Porsche 911, was introduced to the US market (it was introduced slightly earlier in Europe). The company continued to sell the 356 C in North America through 1965 as demand for the model remained quite strong in the early days of the heavier and more "civilized" 911.

The last ten 356s (cabriolets) were assembled for the Dutch Rijkspolitie, the highway patrolling predecessor of the Netherlands police force, in March 1966 as 1965 models. Using Porsches to control traffic and speeders was so successful on Dutch express-ways, that the Dutch national police branch kept using Porsche 911s into the watercooled era that began in 1998.

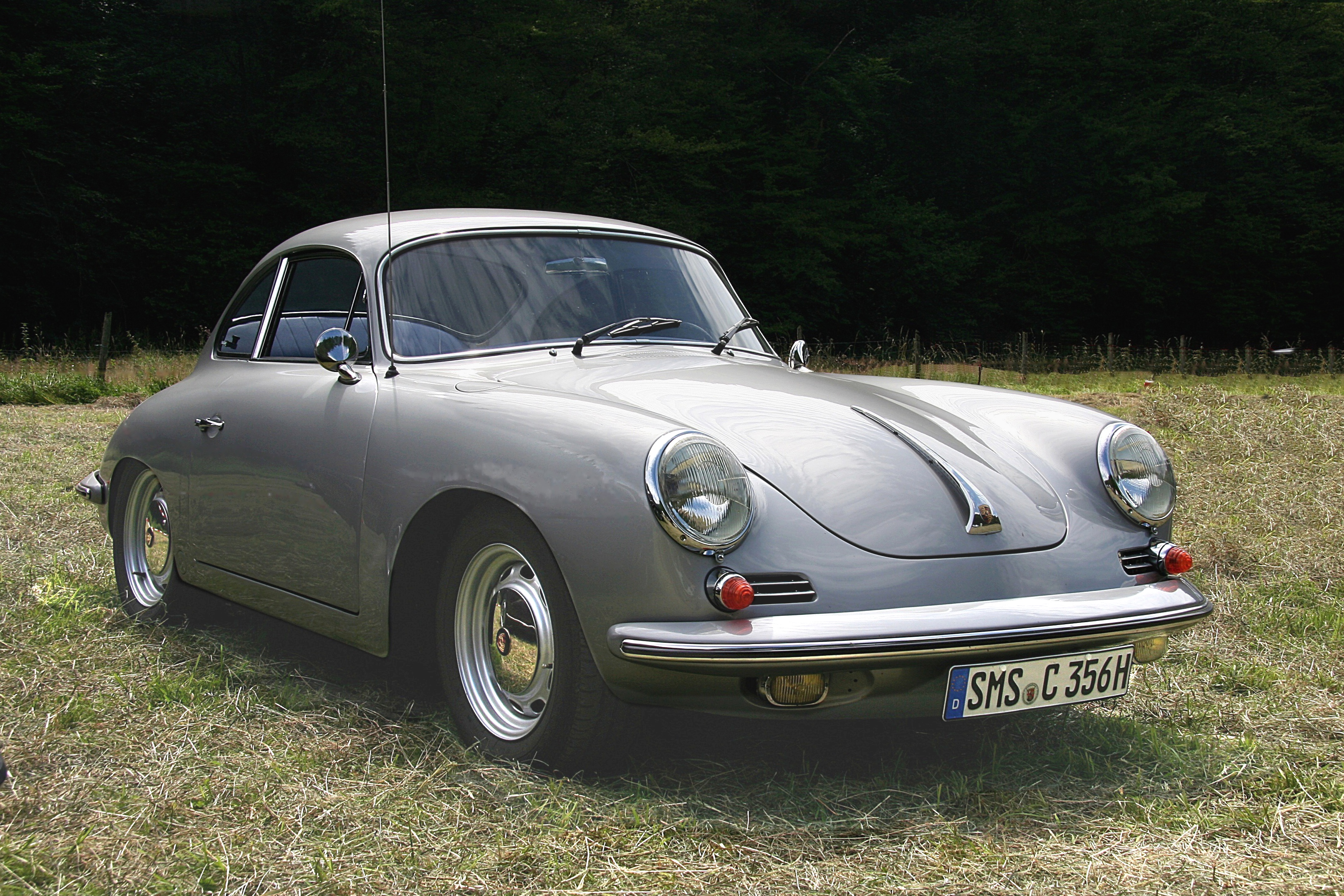
Porsche 356 C from 1964

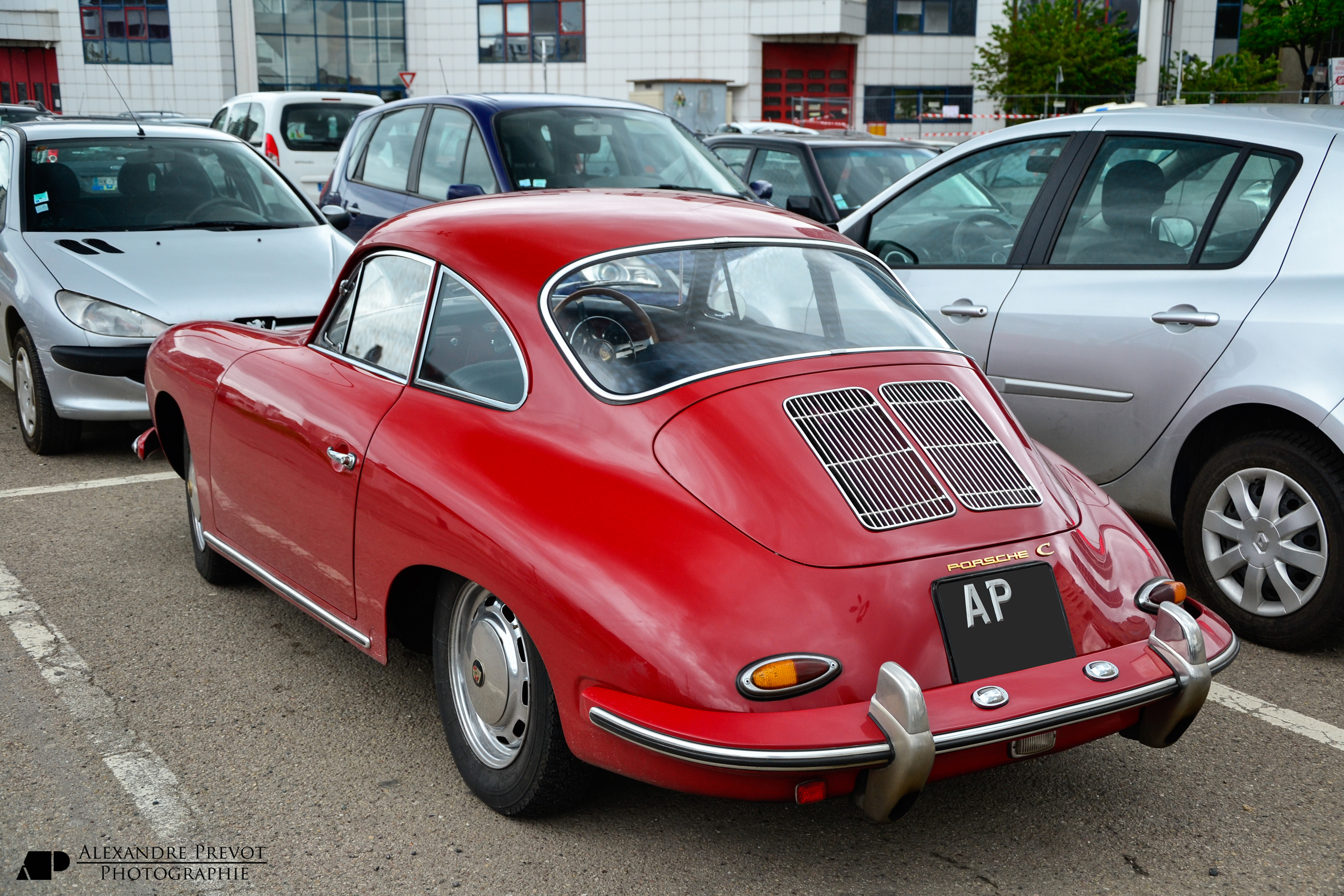
Porsche 356 C rear

=== 530 ===
In 1953, Studebaker contacted Porsche to develop a new engine, but they developed an entire car that was a four-seat version of the 356. The prototype called Porsche 530 was rejected as Studebaker wanted a larger car, with larger engine and with the engine in the front. The new prototype was called Porsche 542 or Studebaker Z-87.

== Body styles ==
The 356 originated as a coupé only 1948–1955. Over time, a variety of other styles appeared, including roadster, convertible, cabriolet, and a very rare split-roof.

The basic design of the 356 remained the same until production ended in 1965, with evolutionary, functional improvements rather than annual superficial styling changes.

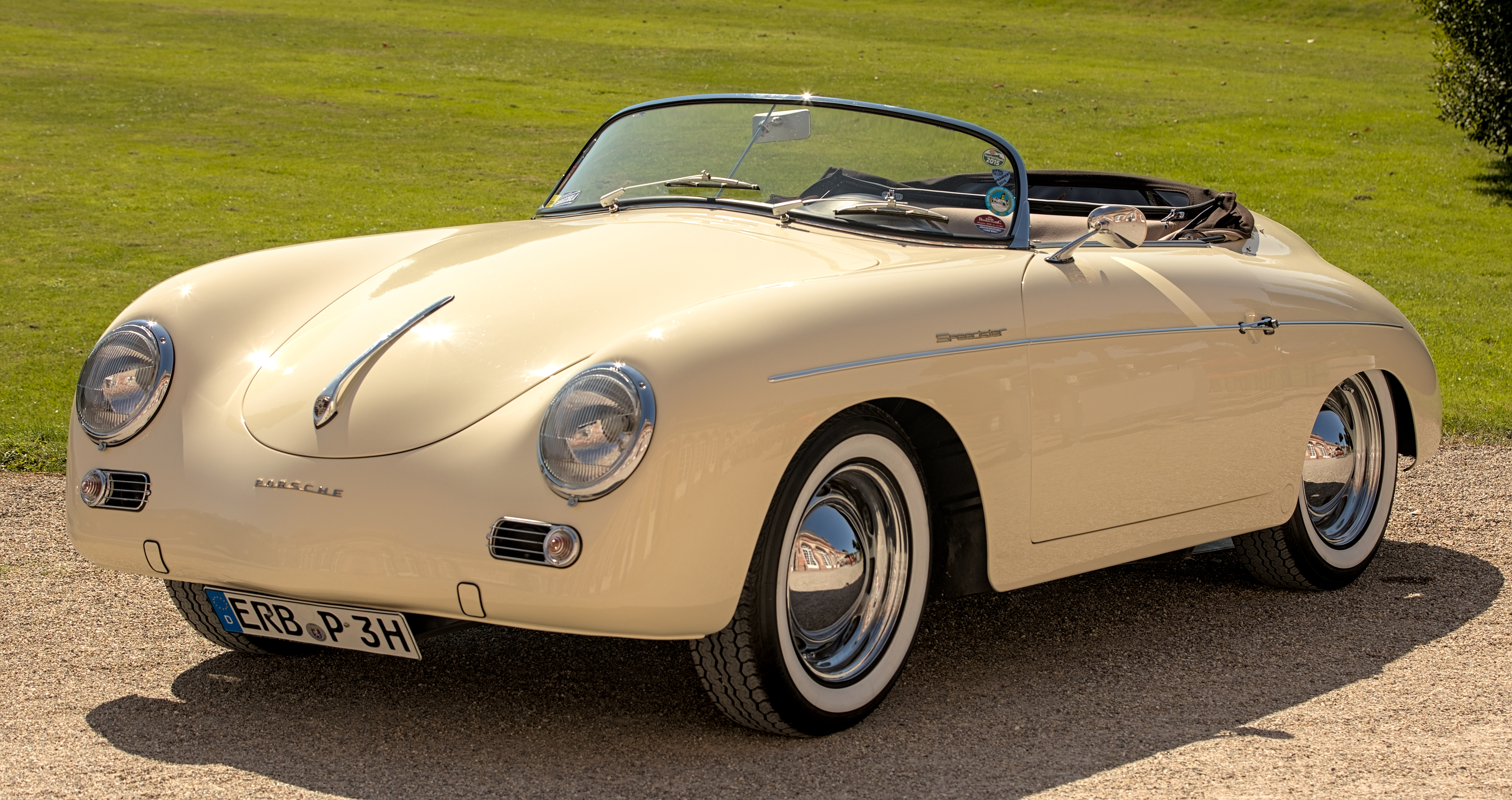
Porsche 356 Speedster – the low windshield was standard; its front bumper has been removed

The car used unibody construction, making restoration difficult for cars that were kept in rust-prone climates. Cabriolet models (convertibles with a full windshield and padded top) were offered from the start, and, in the early 1950s, sometimes comprised over 50% of total production.

One of the most desirable collector models is the 356 "Speedster", introduced in late 1954 after Max Hoffman advised the company that a lower-cost, somewhat spartan open-top version could sell well in the American market. With its low, raked windscreen (which could be removed for weekend racing), bucket seats and minimal folding top, the Speedster was an instant hit, especially in Southern California. A total of 4,854 speedsters were built (all years combined). It was replaced in late 1958 by the "convertible D" model. It featured a taller, more practical windshield (allowing improved headroom with the top erected), roll-up glass side-windows and more comfortable seats. The following year the 356 B "roadster" convertible replaced the D model but the sports car market's love affair with top-down motoring was fading; soft-top 356 model sales declined significantly in the early 1960s.

A unique "Karmann hardtop" or "notchback" 356 B model was produced in 1961 and 1962, essentially a cabriolet-style body with a permanent metal roof.

== Engine ==
Porsche designers designed the 356's air-cooled pushrod OHV flat-four around the engine case originally designed for the Volkswagen Beetle, adding new cylinder heads, camshaft, crankshaft, intake and exhaust manifolds and dual carburetors, making 52 kW (70 hp) – more than double the Beetle's horsepower. While the first prototype 356 had a mid-engine layout, all subsequent 356 engines were rear-mounted. The four-cam "Carrera" engine appeared in late 1955 as an extra cost option on the 356 A, and remained available through the 356 model run.

== Legacy ==
In 2004, Sports Car International ranked the 356 C tenth on their list of top sports cars of the 1960s. It remains a highly regarded collector car, regularly bringing between US$20,000 and well over US$100,000 at auction. The limited production Carrera Speedster (with its special DOHC racing engine), SC, Super 90, and Speedster models are among the most desirable. Multiple restored Carrera variants (of which only about 140 were made) have sold for values in excess of US$800,000, with the vast majority sold for more than US$300,000 at auction. As of December 2015, the most expensive 356 to sell was the daily driver of rock singer Janis Joplin that was sold in New York by RM Sotheby's for $1,760,000 (£1,163,630) in 2015.

== Motorsport ==
Porsche 356 B Carrera GTL Abarth
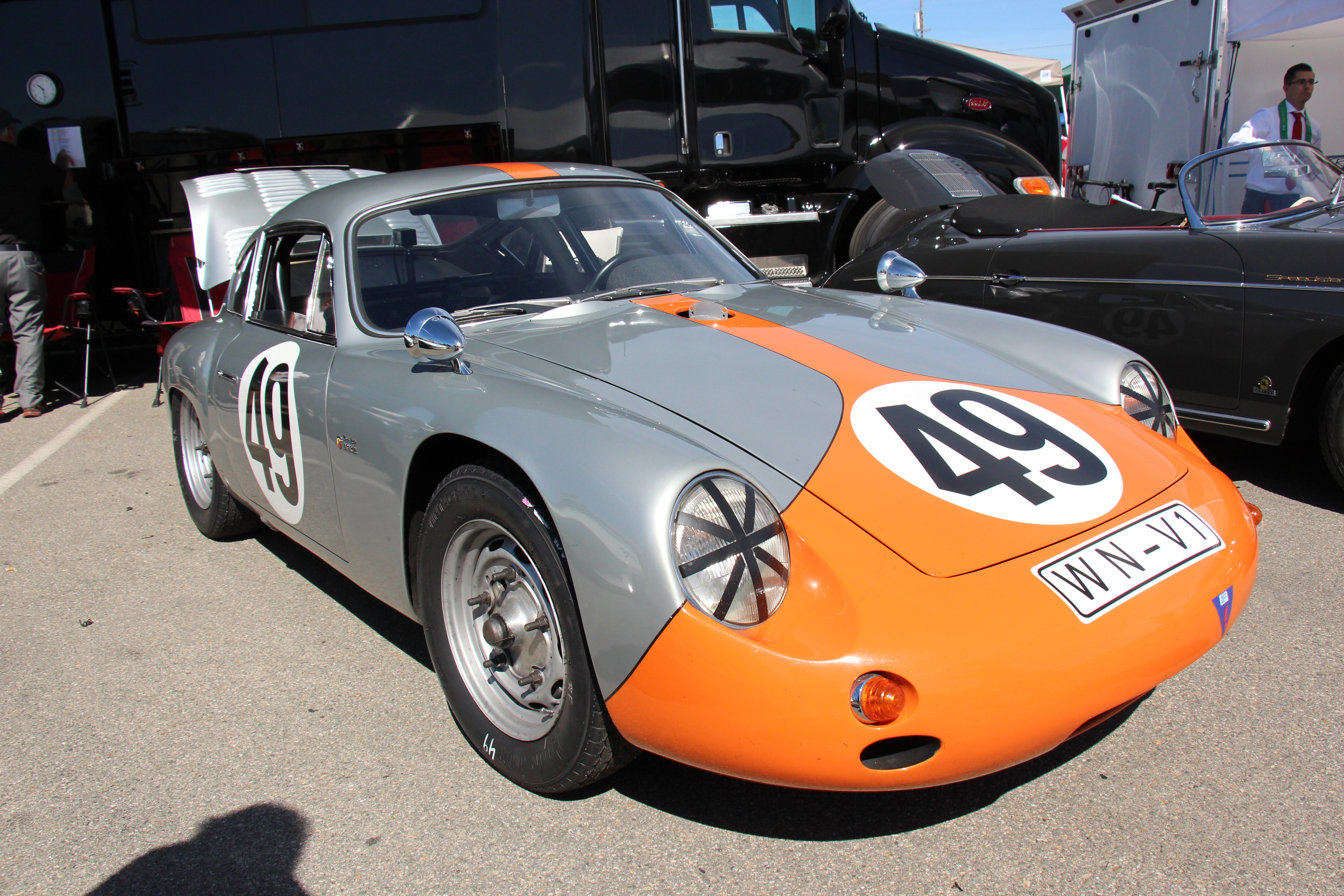
- Constructor: Porsche/Abarth
- Designers: Carlo Abarth; Franco Scaglione
- Production: 1960-1961

Technical specifications
- Chassis: Aluminum body on steel platform chassis
- Suspension: Double longitudinal links, torsion bars, anti-roll bar (front); Pendulum shaft, torsion bars, anti-roll bars (rear)
- Length: 3,980 mm (157 in)
- Width: 1,672 mm (65.8 in)
- Height: 1,228 mm (48.3 in)
- Axle track: Front: 1,306 mm (51.4 in); Rear: 1,272 mm (50.1 in)
- Wheelbase: 2,100 mm (83 in)
- Engine: Rear-engined, longitudinally mounted, 1.6 L (98 cu in), DOHC, B4, 2-valves per cylinder, NA
- Transmission: 4-speed manual
- Power: 115–135 hp (86–101 kW)
- Weight: 1,720 lb (780 kg)
- Brakes: Hydraulic drum brakes

Competition history

The Porsche 356, close to stock or highly modified, has enjoyed much success in rallying and car racing events.

At the 1951 24 Hours of Le Mans, Porsche was the first and only German manufacturer to compete. Porsche fielded the 356 SL (Super Leicht, super light) "Gmünd-Coupe" with its streamlined aluminum body and covered wheels. The debut was a huge success: Auguste Veuillet and his friend Edmond Mouche won the class 751 to 1100 cc and received the flag as 20th overall.

Several Porsche 356s were stripped down in weight and were modified in order to have better performance and handling for these races. A few notable examples include the Porsche 356 SL, and the Porsche 356 A Carrera GT.

In the early 1960s, Porsche collaborated with Abarth and built the Porsche 356 B Carrera GTL Abarth coupé, which enjoyed some success in motorsports.

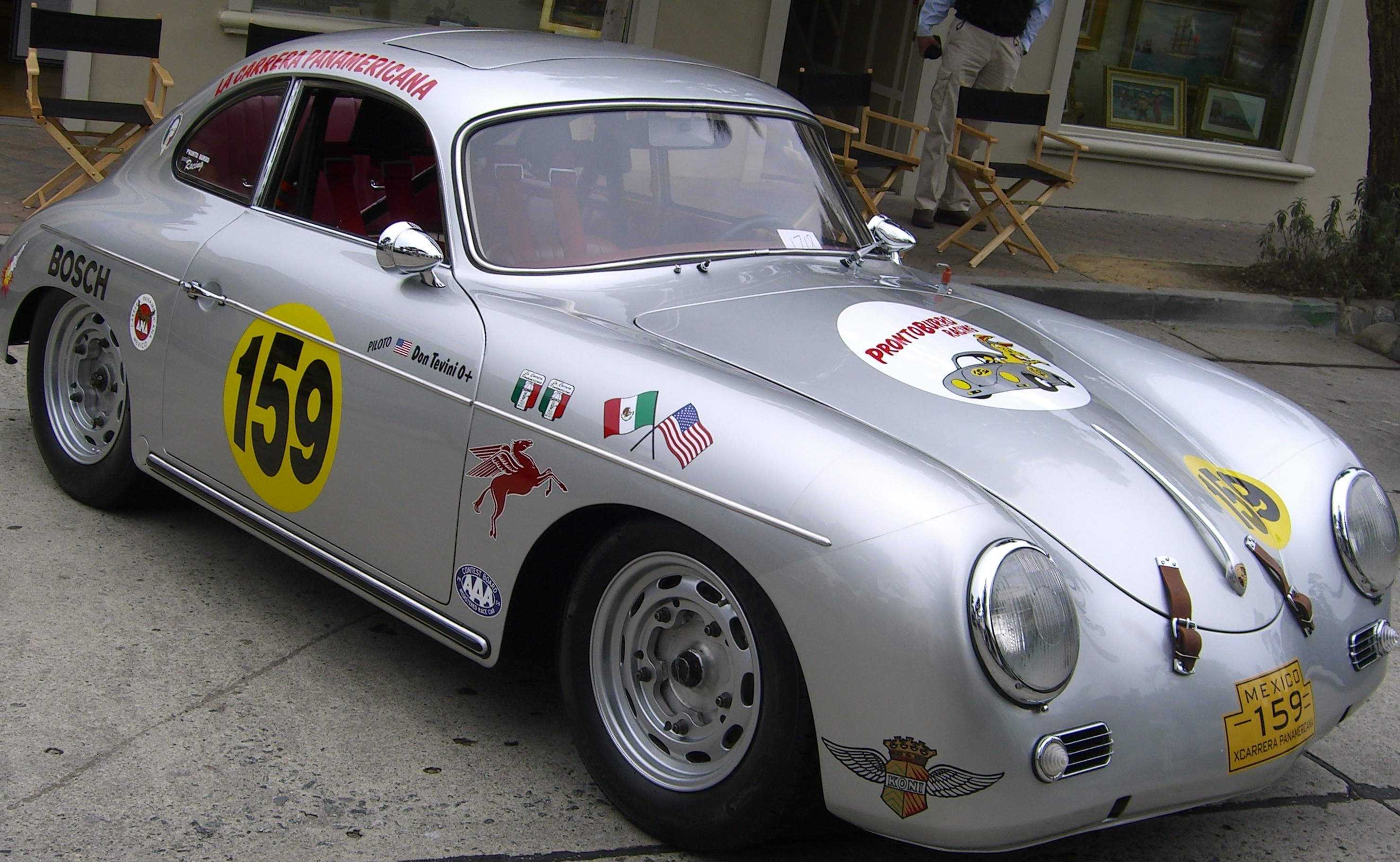
Race-prepared 1959 356 A

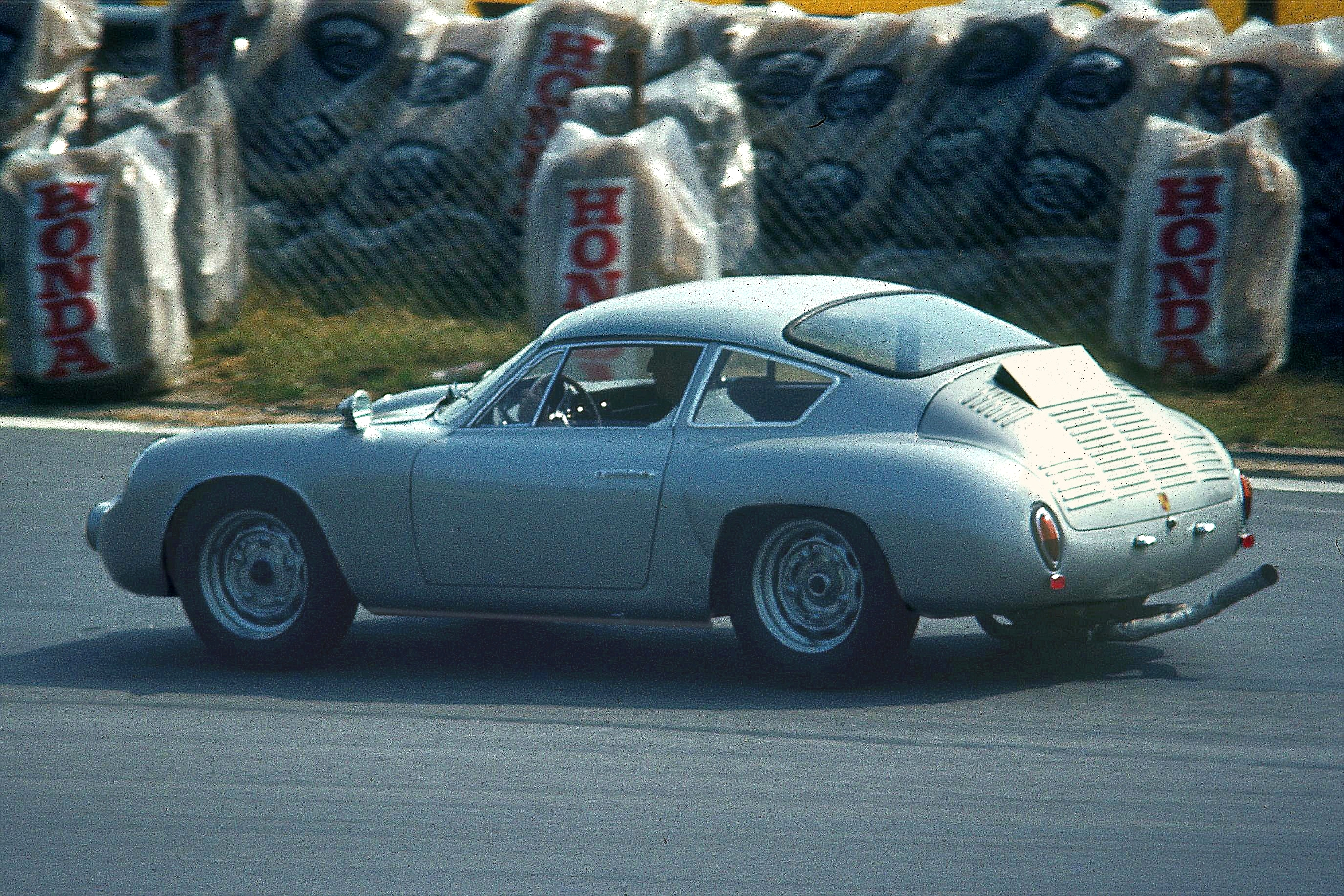
Porsche 356 B Carrera GTL Abarth

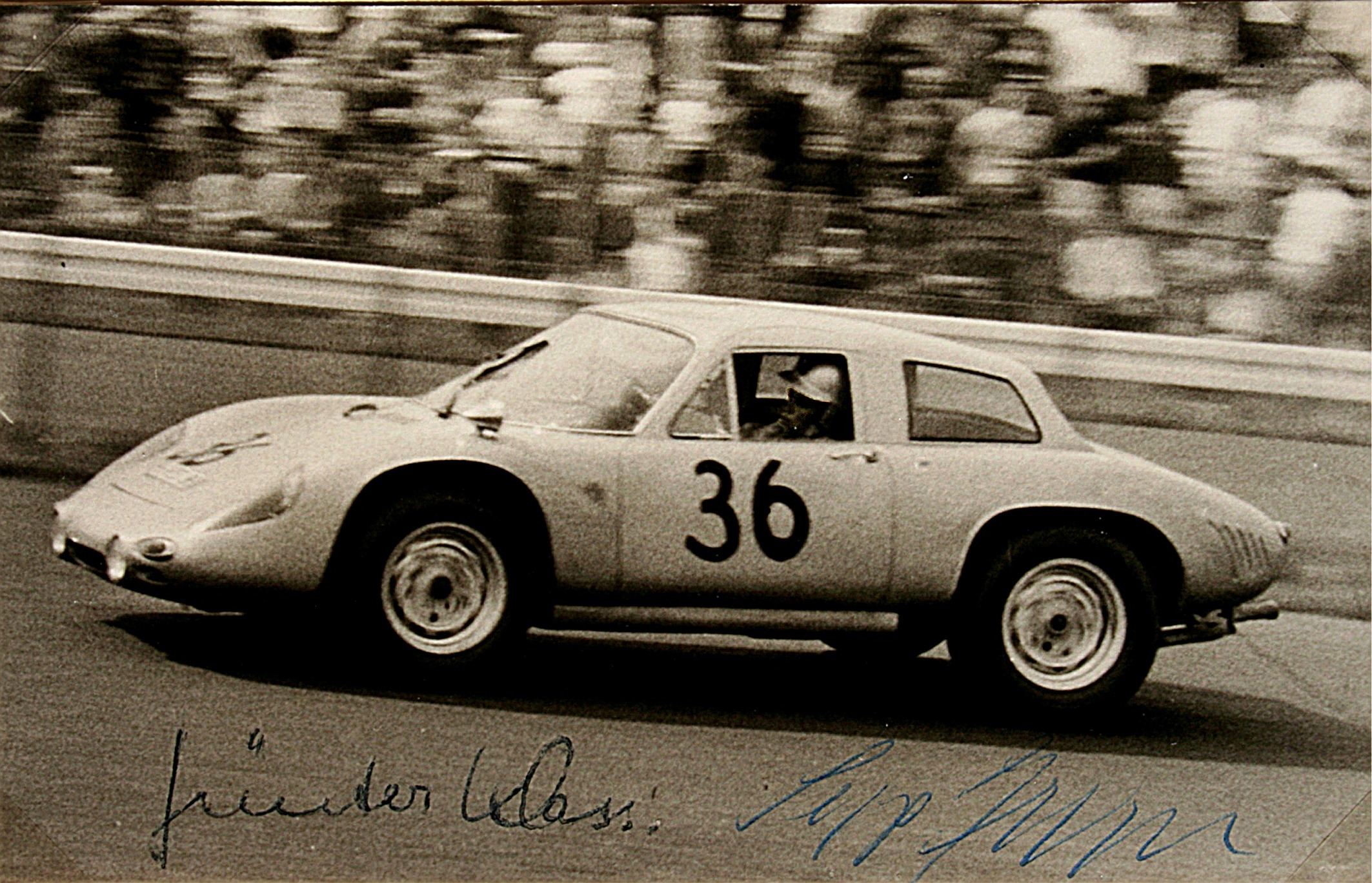
Porsche 356 B 2000 GS Carrera GT Dreikantschaber Günter Klass/Sepp Greger, Nürburgring 1964

== First Carrera car ==
Number 53456, the first 356 Carrera ever produced (a modified May 3, 1955, exemplar owned by Porsche engineer Reinhard Schmidt as first owner), was analyzed in February 2018 by Quattroruote's subsidiary Ruoteclassiche. It was estimated that its price was about €335,000.

== See also ==
- Porsche 64
- Porsche 550 Spyder
- Ferdinand Anton Ernst Porsche
- Porsche Salzburg
- Fritz Huschke von Hanstein
- Lake Underwood—an American race driver who helped popularise the model
- DKW Monza
