= Mercedes-AMG Concept GT XX =

Concept car produced by Mercedes-AMG

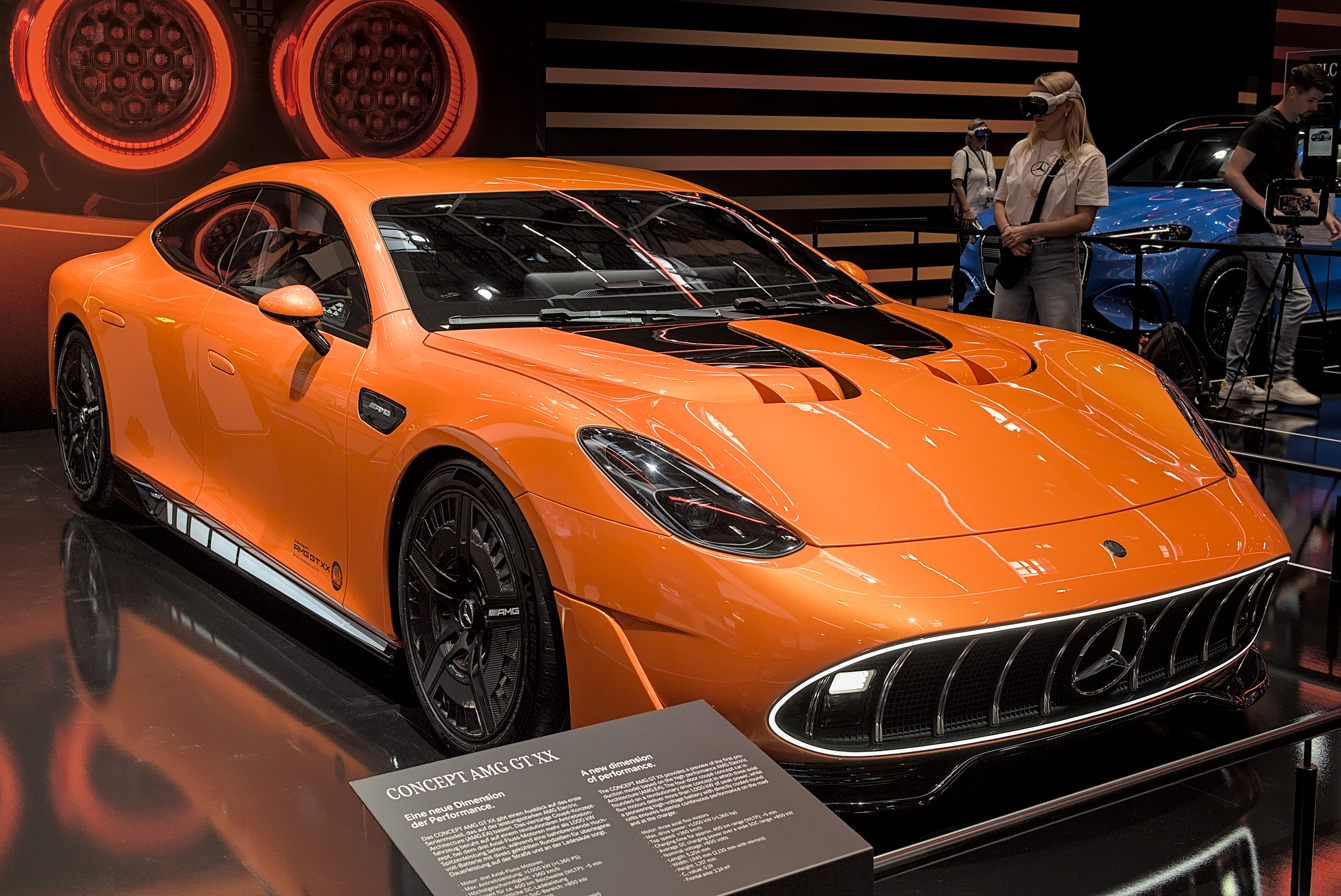

Overview
- Manufacturer: Mercedes-AMG
- Production: 2025
- Designer: Matthias Schenker

Body and chassis
- Class: Concept car
- Body style: 4-door sedan
- Platform: AMG.EA

Powertrain
- Electric motor: 3x YASA axial-flux
- Power output: 1,341 hp (1,000 kW; 1,360 PS)
- Battery: 114 kWh NMCA
- Plug-in charging: 900 kW DC

Dimensions
- Length: 5,200 mm (200 in)
- Width: 2,130 mm (84 in)
- Height: 1,310 mm (52 in)

The Mercedes-AMG Concept GT XX is a concept car developed by Mercedes-AMG. It was presented on 25 June 2025, in Affalterbach.

== Overview ==
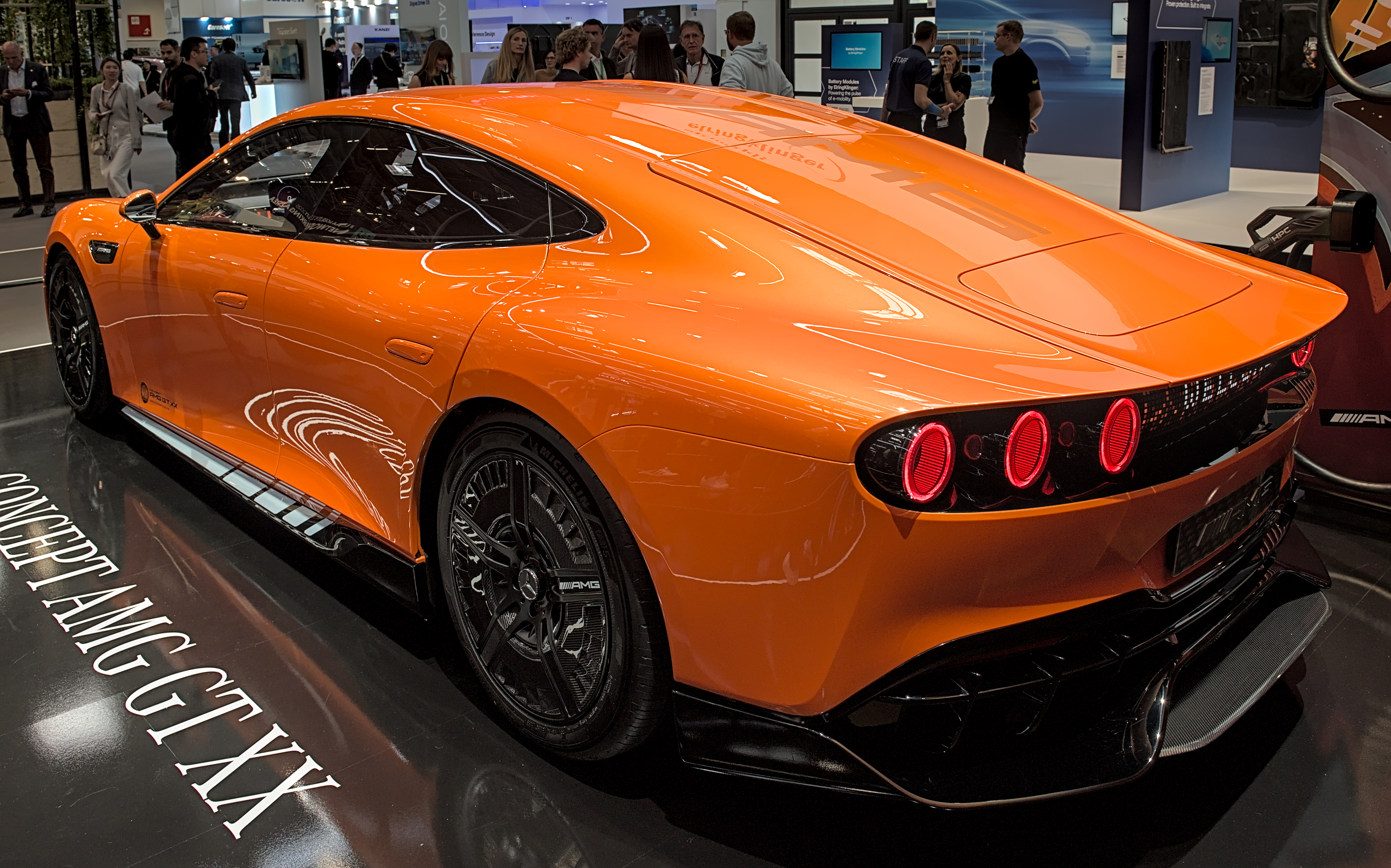
Rear view

The GT XX is 5.20 meters long, 1.95 meters wide without mirrors (2.13 meters with mirrors), and 1.31 meters high. The body has no rear window. The drag coefficient is said to be 0.198. The vehicle is based on the new AMG.EA platform. The car has so-called aero wheels: they are 21 inches in diameter and have five movable plastic elements ("aeroblades"), allowing more cooling air to reach the brakes, for example. At the rear, between the taillights, there is a display for information; this can be used to indicate charging, for example.

The vehicle is powered by three electric motors: two at the rear and one at the front. Together, they generate a peak power of 1000 kW (1360 hp). The axial-flux engines are comparatively short. The engines of this design come from the British company YASA Limited, founded in 2009; YASA was acquired by the Mercedes-Benz Group in 2021. The battery, with cylindrical cells and a voltage of over 800 V, is located in the center of the vehicle. Its individual cells are cooled with a liquid.

== 24 hours records for EVs ==
24 hour EV distance records
Vehicle	Date set	Distance	Average speed
Porsche Taycan Turbo prototype	August 2019	3,425 km (2,128 mi)	142.7 km/h (88.7 mph)
Mercedes CLA prototype	April 2024	3717 km (2309.6 mi)	154.9 km/h (96.3 mph)
Xiaomi YU7 Max	July 2025	3,944 km (2,451 mi)	164.3 km/h (102.1 mph)
Xpeng P7	August 2025	3961 km (2461 mi)	165.0 km/h (102.5 mph)
Mercedes-AMG Concept GT XX	August 2025	5480 km (3405 mi)	228.3 km/h (141.9 mph)

In 2024, two prototypes of the new third-generation Mercedes CLA had set a new electric-vehicle distance record of 3717 km (2309.6 mi) within 24 hours at the Nardò Ring test track in southern Italy, which is owned by Porsche. With the CLA top speed limited to 210 km/h (130 mph), and 40 fast charging stops for approximately 10 minutes each, a team of drivers managed to average 154.9 km/h (96.3 mph) over 24 hours, bettering the 3,425 km (2,128 mi) record set there by Porsche Taycan in 2019 by 12.2 km/h (7.6 mph). In July 2025, a Xiaomi YU7 Max covered 3,944 km (2,451 mi) in a 24-hour endurance test with speeds exceeding 210 km/h (130 mph), bettered in August 2025 by 17 km (11 mi) with 3961 km (2461 mi) by the second-generation Xpeng P7.

Mercedes returned to Nardo in August 2025 with a pair of GT XX lapping at above 290 km/h (180 mph) non-stop apart from frequent rapid charges with up to 900 kW. The faster of the two cars covered a distance of 5480 km (3405 mi) in 24 hours. That's a new EV 24 hour world record, just shy of 1000 miles better than the previous record holder, the Chinese Xpeng P7, and almost a third better than Mercedes's own CLA. It also bettered the all-time distance record of the Le Mans 24 hours race, set at 5411 km (3362 mi) in 2010 by an Audi R15 TDI Diesel. After 24 hours, the team went on to cover a distance that could lap the Earth in under eight days. Along with the 24-hour record, the GT XX clocked EV endurance records for 12, 48, 72, 96, 120, 144, and 168 hours.

The overall FIA World Record for 24h, still valid as of summer 2025, was set in 2002 by a Volkswagen W12, covering a distance of 7740.576 kilometres (4809.8 mi) at an average speed of 322.891 km/h (200.6 mph). Both the W12 and the GTXX have similar top speeds of around 360 km/h (220 mph).
