= Volkswagen ARVW =

ARVW
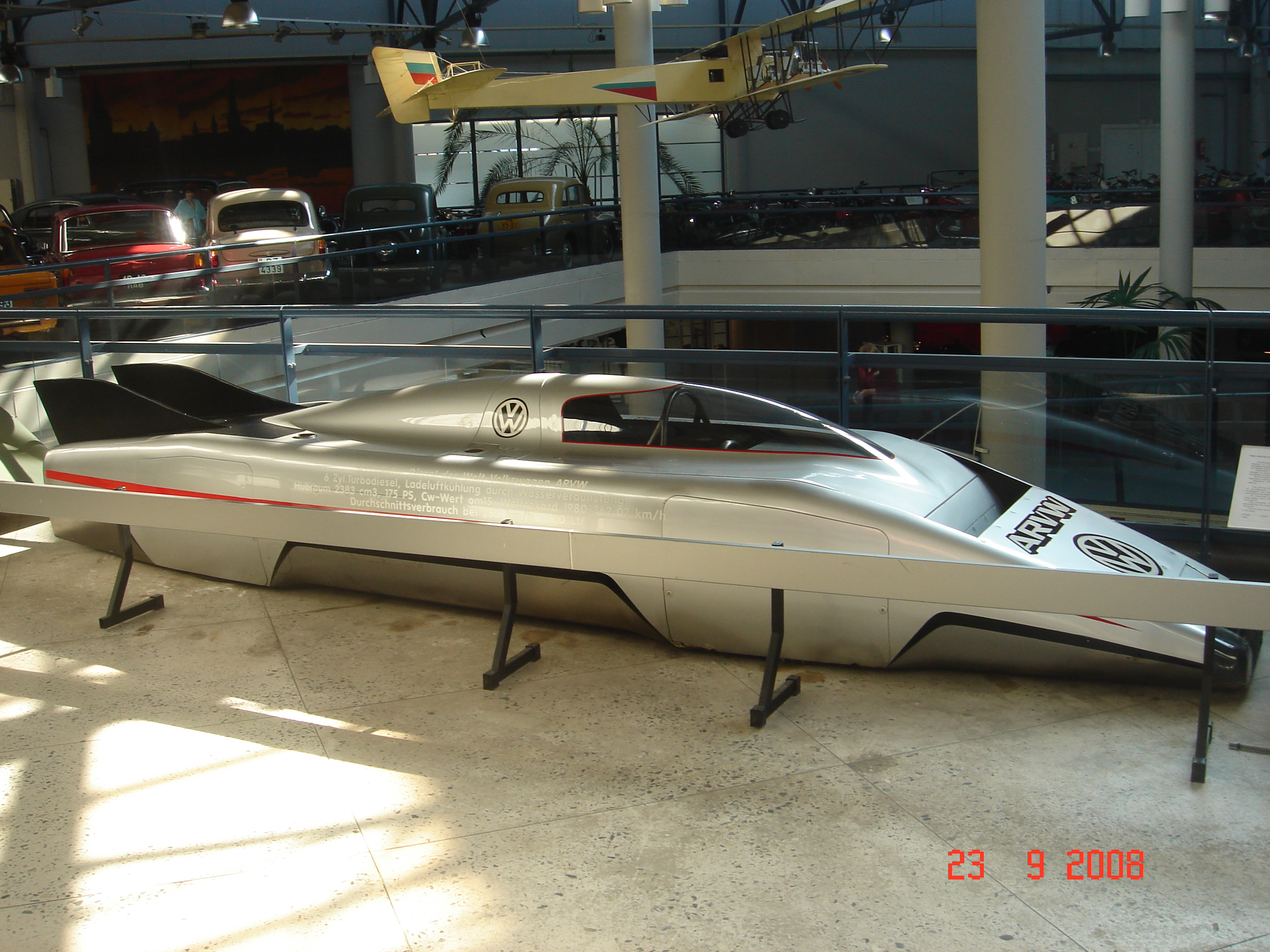

Overview
- Manufacturer: Volkswagen
- Production: 1970s (concept car)

Body and chassis
- Class: Concept car

The ARVW (Aerodynamic Research Volkswagen) concept car was built by Volkswagen in the end of the 1970s, initially for aerodynamic research to investigate the influence of a vehicle's shape on its fuel consumption at high speeds. A tuned, six-cylinder turbodiesel engine and a conventional gearbox were used, while the body was made from aluminium and composite materials.

The ARVW was the fastest diesel car in the world in 1980, reaching a top speed of 362.07 km/h (225 mph).

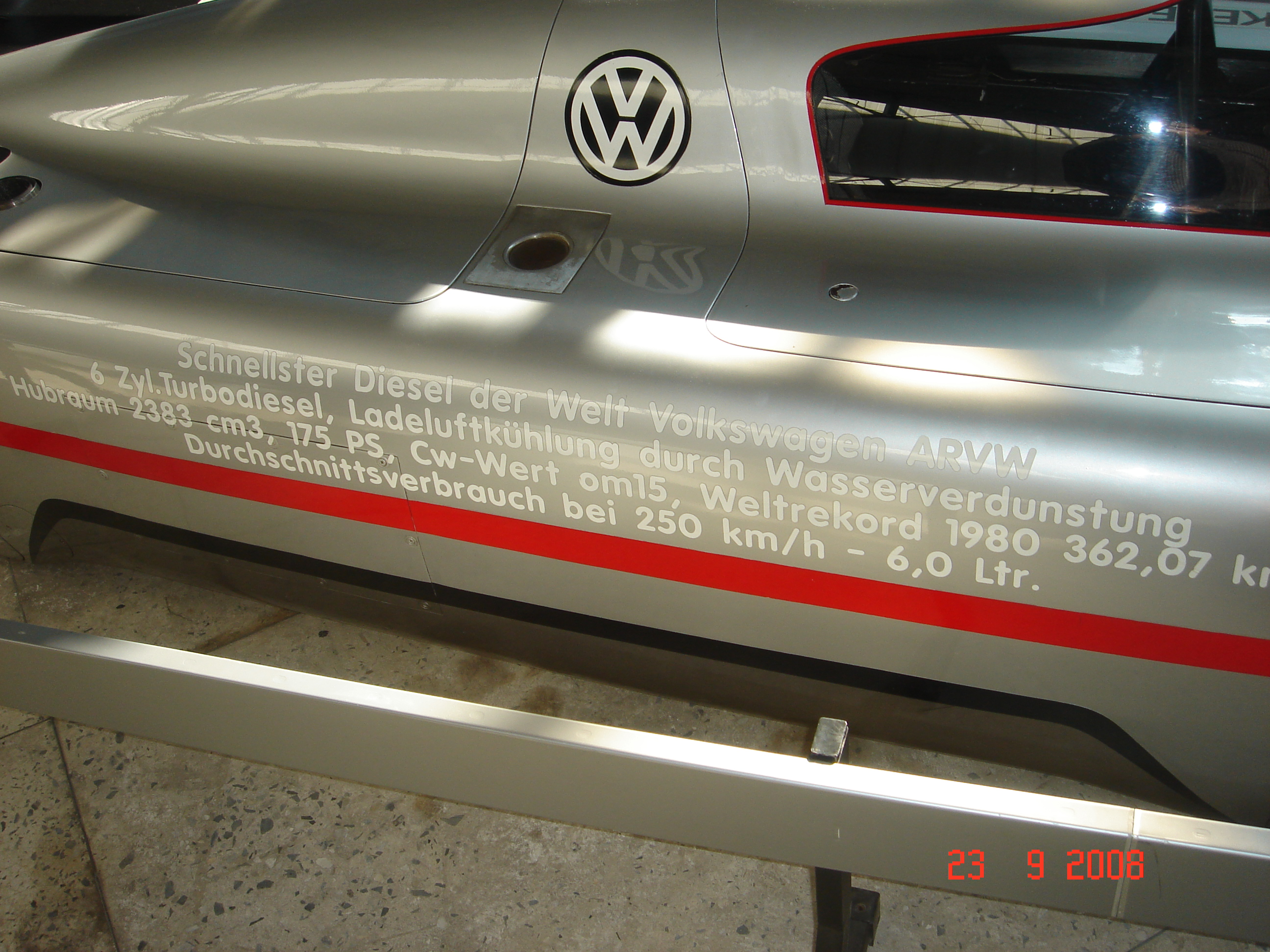
Fastest diesel car in 1980s. Riga Motor Museum, Latvia (October 2008)
