= Porsche 542 =

Overview
- Manufacturer: Porsche
- Also called: Studebaker Z-87
- Production: 1953

Body and chassis
- Class: Concept car
- Body style: 4-door sedan
- Layout: FR layout

Powertrain
- Engine: 3.0L V6

Porsche 542 or Studebaker Z-87 was a prototype made by Porsche for Studebaker in 1953. The first prototype Porsche 530, a four-seat version of the Porsche 356, was rejected. The new prototype got a different engine, a 3.0 liter, 120 degree V6, unusual for 1953. Two versions were developed, one air cooled 542L and one water cooled 542W. After testing, the water cooled engine was judged more practical as it gave slightly better performance at 105 horsepower and was also lighter. It was a sedan with independent suspension front and rear, also unusual for the time.

The finished car and engines was due to have shipped over to Studebaker in 1953 or early 1954, but by then Studebaker was occupied with saving the company and it was only after the merger with Packard in 1956 they got around to have a look. But the design that was modern in 1953 was dated in 1956. John DeLorean evaluated the car and judged that it no longer filled any purpose and would not appeal to US car buyers.
