= Spyker C8 =

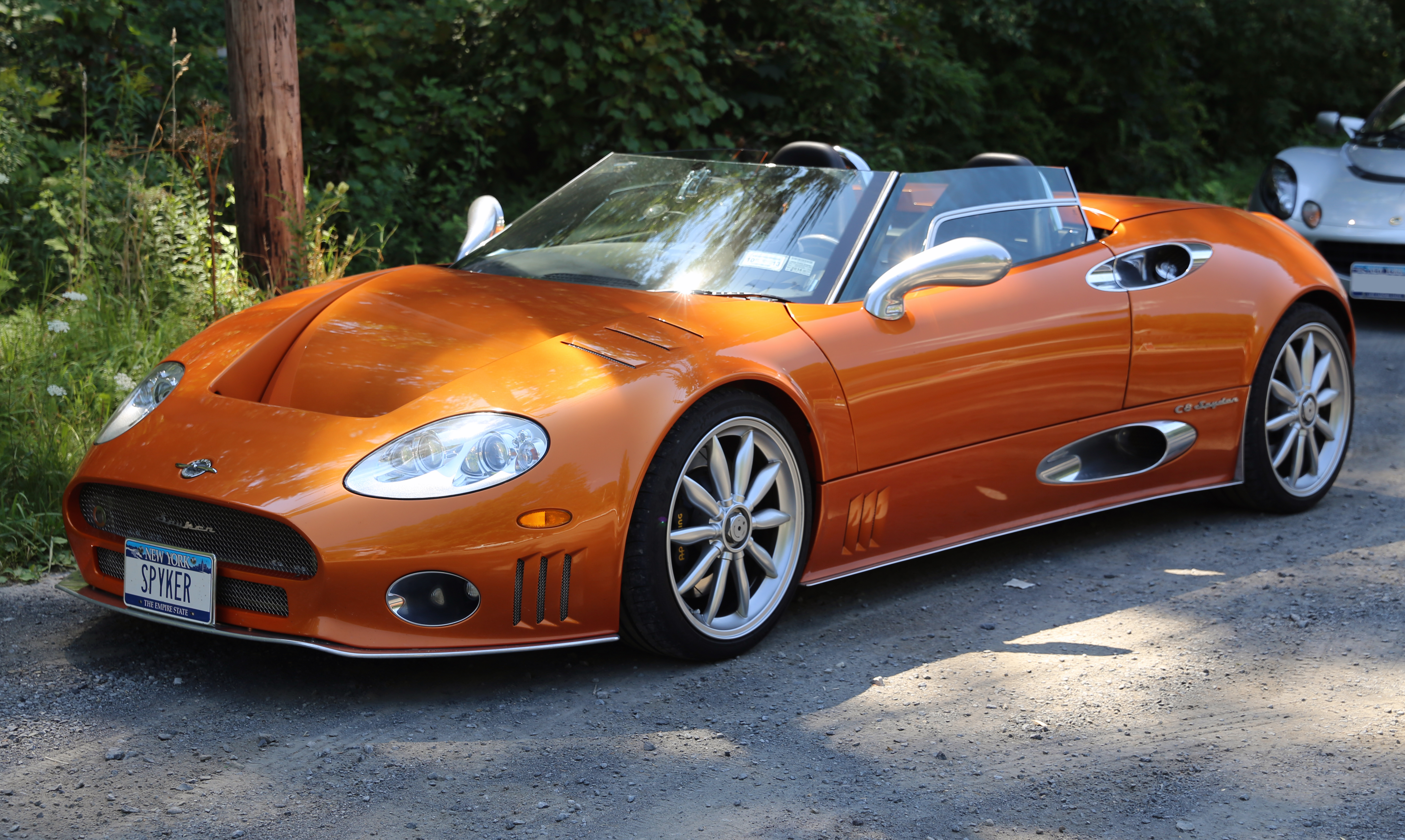
- 2009 Spyker C8 Spyder

Overview
- Manufacturer: Spyker Cars
- Production: 2000–present
- Assembly: Zeewolde, Netherlands
- Designer: Maarten de Bruijn; Simon Koop (C8 Aileron, C8 Preliator)

Body and chassis
- Class: Sports car (S)
- Body style: 2-door convertible (Spyder, Aileron Spyder, Preliator Spyder); 2-door coupé (Laviolette, Double 12S, Aileron, Preliator)
- Layout: RMR layout
- Doors: Scissor

Powertrain
- Engine: 4.0 L Mader-BMW V8 (Double 12S and 12R); 4.2L Audi V8 (Twin Turbo or Supercharged in Later versions)
- Power output: 400–620 hp (298–462 kW; 406–629 PS)
- Transmission: Getrag 6-speed manual ZF 6-speed automatic

Dimensions
- Wheelbase: 2,575–2,725 mm (101.4–107.3 in)
- Length: 4,185–4,628 mm (164.8–182.2 in)
- Width: 1,880–1,953 mm (74.0–76.9 in)
- Height: 1,080–1,270 mm (42.5–50.0 in)
- Curb weight: 1,250–1,424 kg (2,756–3,139 lb)

Chronology
- Predecessor: Spyker Silvestris V8

The Spyker C8 is a sports car produced by the Dutch automaker Spyker Cars since 2000. The design takes visual cues from the 1999 Spyker Silvestris V8 prototype but with changes to the proportions.

== First generation (2000–2012) ==
=== Spyder (2000–2009) ===
The Spyder (later known as the Spyder SWB to distinguish it from Spyker's long-wheelbase offerings) is the original base model of the C8, debuting at the 2000 Birmingham Motor Show. Equipped with an Audi 4.2-litre V8 engine producing 400 PS (294 kW; 395 hp), the Spyder has a top speed of 300 km/h (186 mph). Two roof options were available: soft (early and late) and hardtop. The original propeller steering wheel was replaced with one from a Lotus or Lamborghini Gallardo for safety reasons.

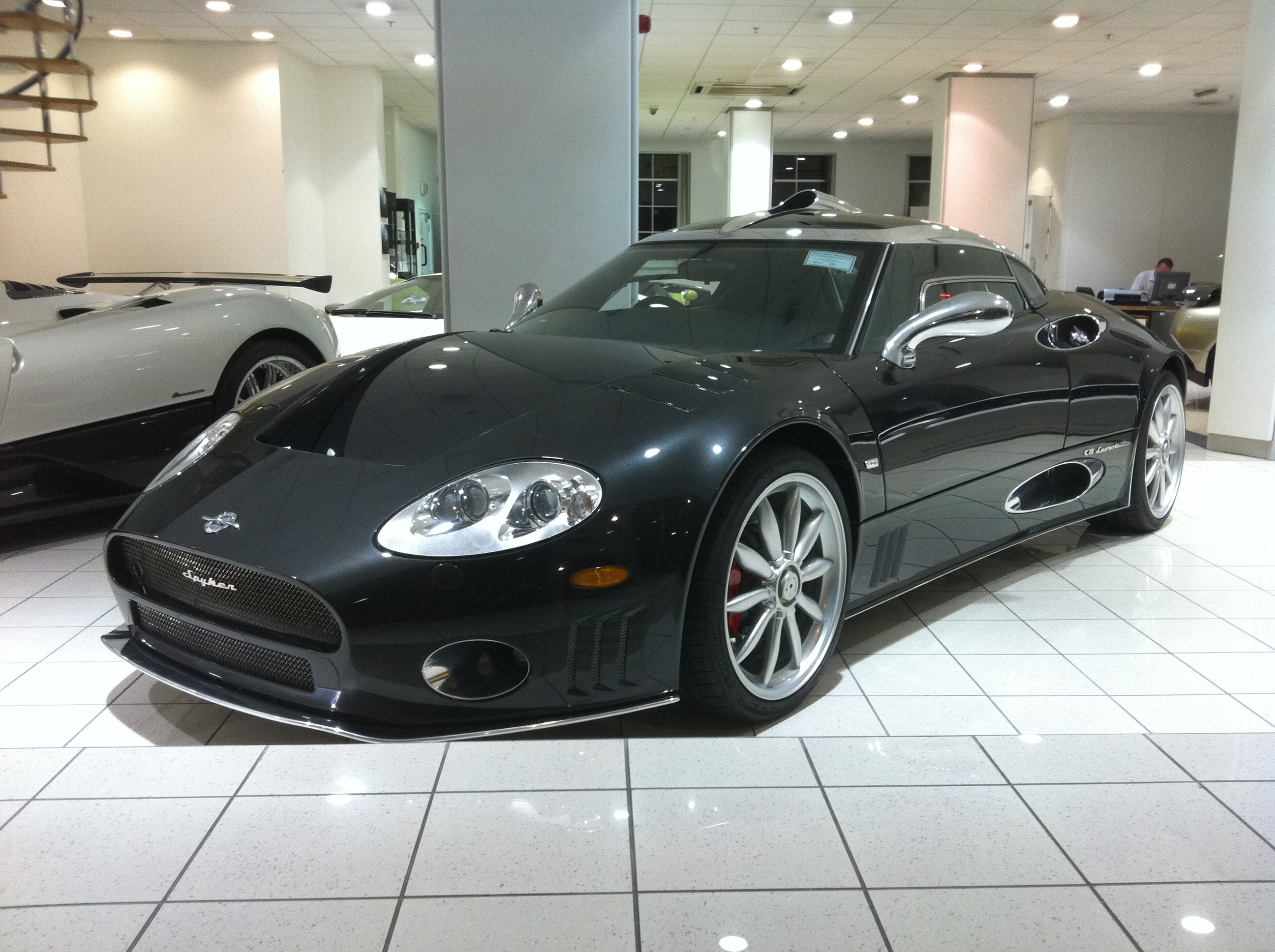
C8 Laviolette

=== Laviolette (2001–2009) ===
The Laviolette was the second C8 model to be developed, and was unveiled by Spyker at AutoRAI 2001. The Laviolette has the same Audi 4.2-litre V8 engine producing 400 PS (294 kW; 395 hp) as the Spyder, but replaces the Spyder's retractable soft top roof with a fixed glass canopy and an integrated roof air intake, making it the first C8 Coupé. 55 Laviolettes were built in total.

The name 'Laviolette' is a reference to Belgian engineer Joseph Valentin Laviolette, who helped develop several Spyker race cars in the early 1900s.

=== Double 12S (2002–2007) ===
The next year, Spyker commemorated the opening of a new factory with the unveiling of the Double 12S on March 21, 2002. The Double 12S is a road-legal version of the Double 12R race car, and as such uses the same Mader-BMW 4.0L V8. The Double 12S was offered in five different stages of tune, listed below:

Stage	Power (bhp)	Power (kW)	0–60 mph (0–97 km/h) time (s)	Top speed
I	400	298	4.5	300 km/h (186 mph)
II	450	336		
III	500	373		
IV	550	410		
V	620	462	3.8	345 km/h (214 mph)

The name 'Double 12' is a reference to the 24-hour world speed record, set in 1922 by racing driver Selwyn Edge in a Spyker C4. The long-wheelbase chassis was supposed to be equipped with a W12 engine, the C12 model, but only two copies were made - a concept and one with a C12 Zagato body.

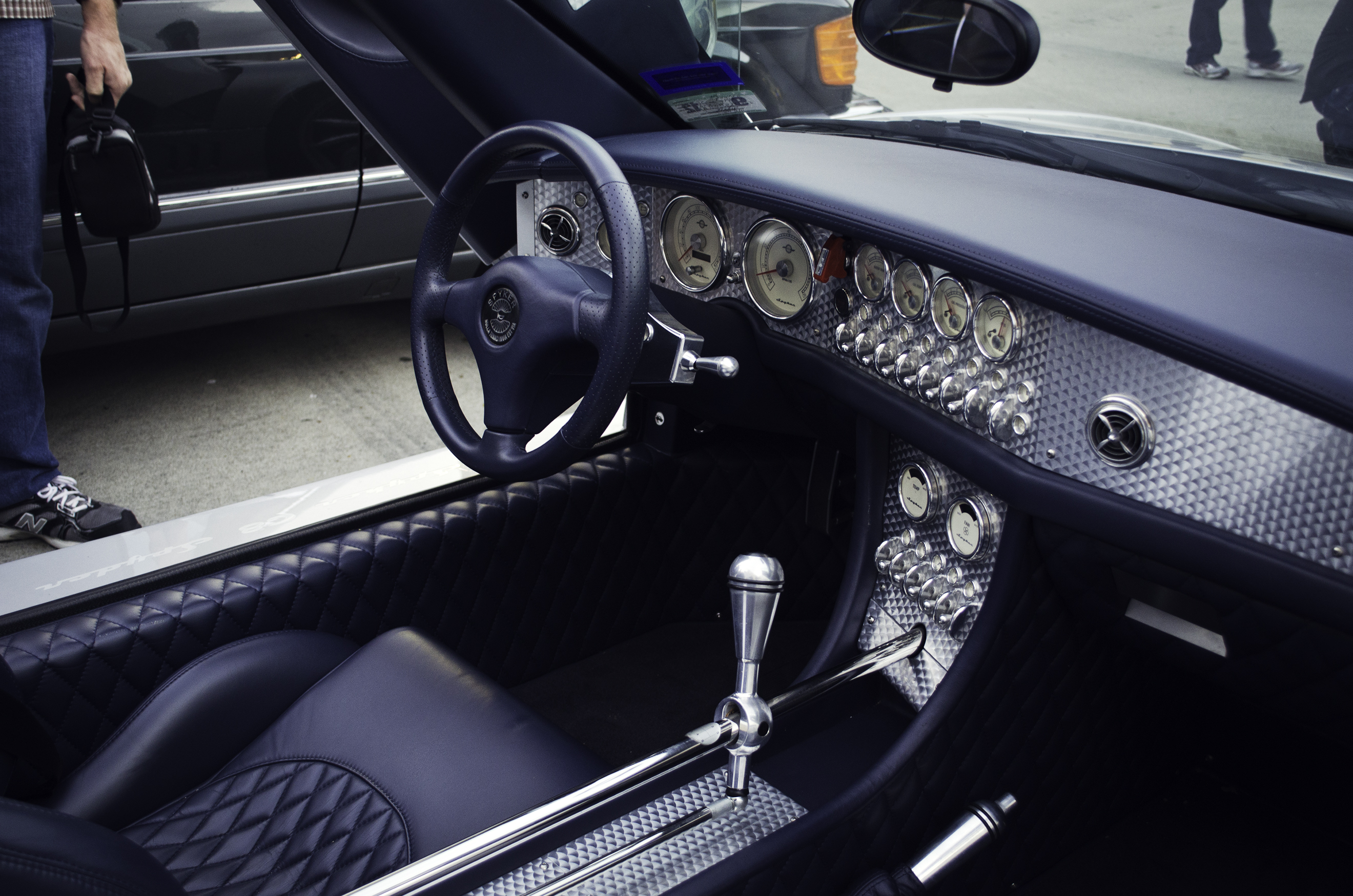
C8 Spyder interior

=== Spyder T (2003–2007) ===
The Spyder T is a modified version of the original C8 Spyder. This updated model, announced by Spyker at the Amsterdam Motor Show in February 2003, features a twin-turbocharged version of the Spyder's 4.2L V8, resulting in a power increase to 525 PS (386 kW; 518 hp). To handle the new powertrain, the Spyder T features a wider track and tires over the standard Spyder, as well as suspension and aerodynamic upgrades.

=== Laviolette LWB (2008–2012) ===
At the 2008 Geneva Motor Show, Spyker introduced a long-wheelbase C8 Laviolette to be produced alongside the original standard-wheelbase car. The new version extended the C8's wheelbase to 2,675 mm (105.3 in) from the original 2,575 mm (101.4 in), meeting customer demands for a more spacious interior. The Laviolette LWB uses the same Audi 4.2L V8 from the original Laviolette, producing 400 PS (294 kW; 395 hp).

=== Laviolette LM85 (2009–2012) ===
The Laviolette LM85 is a road-legal version of the Laviolette GT2-R racing car, much like the Double 12S was to the Double 12R. Production of the LM85 was limited to 24 units to pay homage to the 24 Hours of Le Mans races in which many Spyker race cars have taken part. The Laviolette LM85 was designed after the GT2-R's racing livery, and only offered in a two-tone Burnt Orange/Gun Metal finish. The car utilized the 4.2L Audi V8, producing 400 PS (294 kW; 395 hp).

The 'LM85' name is a combination of the acronym for 'Le Mans' (LM) and the number 85, Spyker Squadron's preferred racing number.

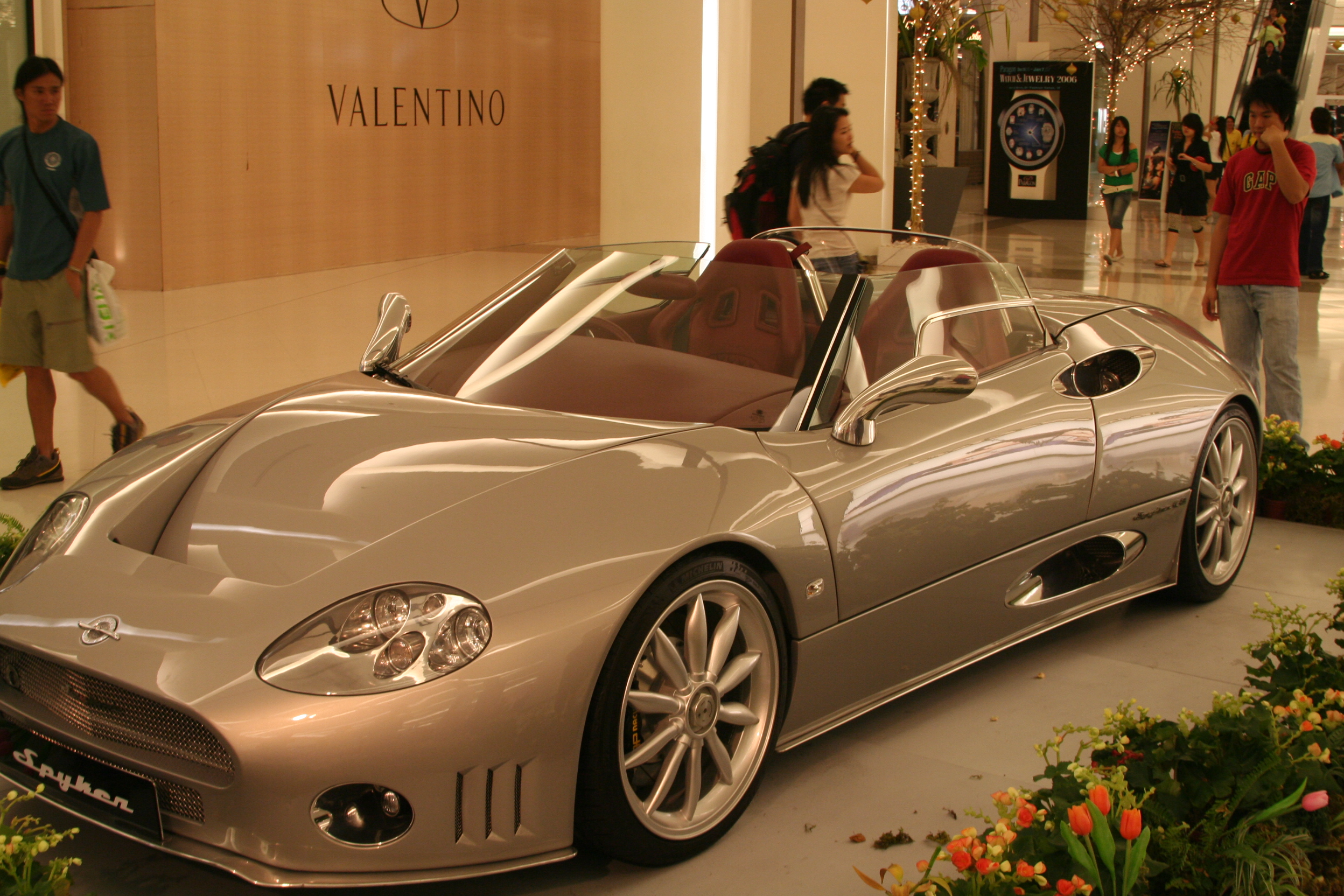
Early form: smooth arches, headlight bulb layout and a signal on the wing

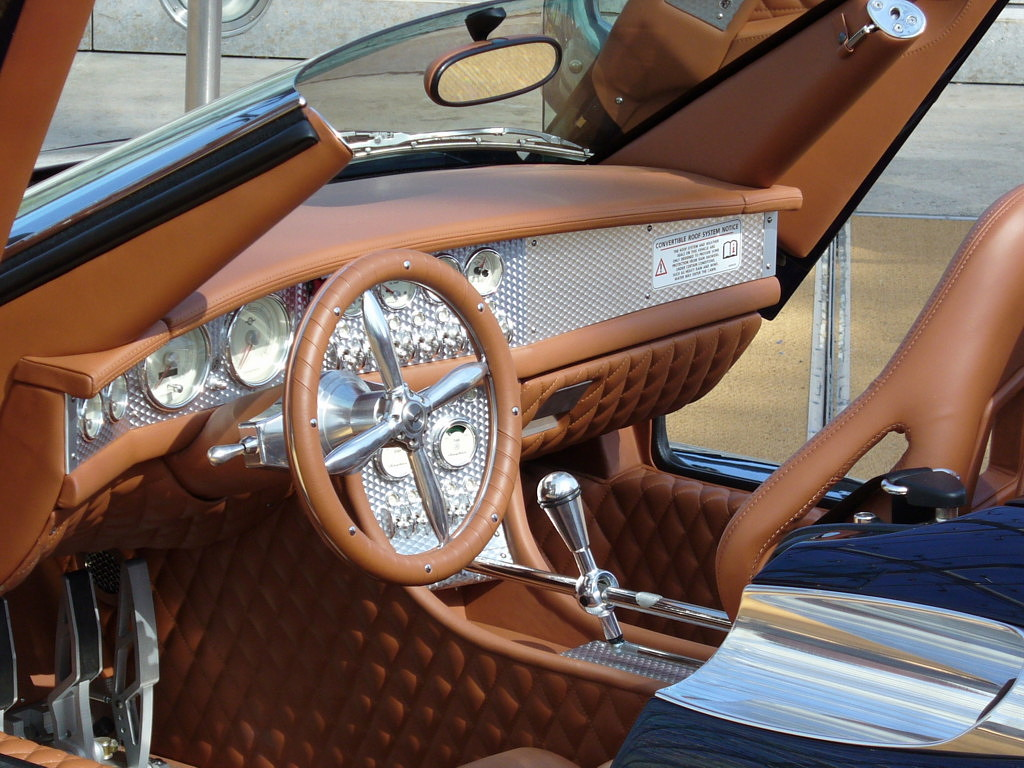
Spyker C8 Spyder interior with a propeller wheel

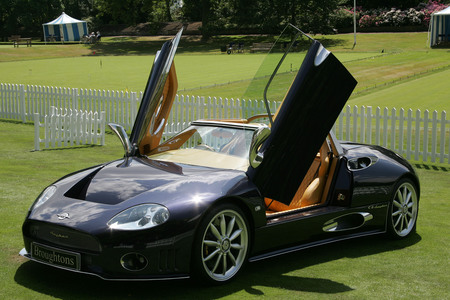
Spyker C8 Spyder with the scissor doors open

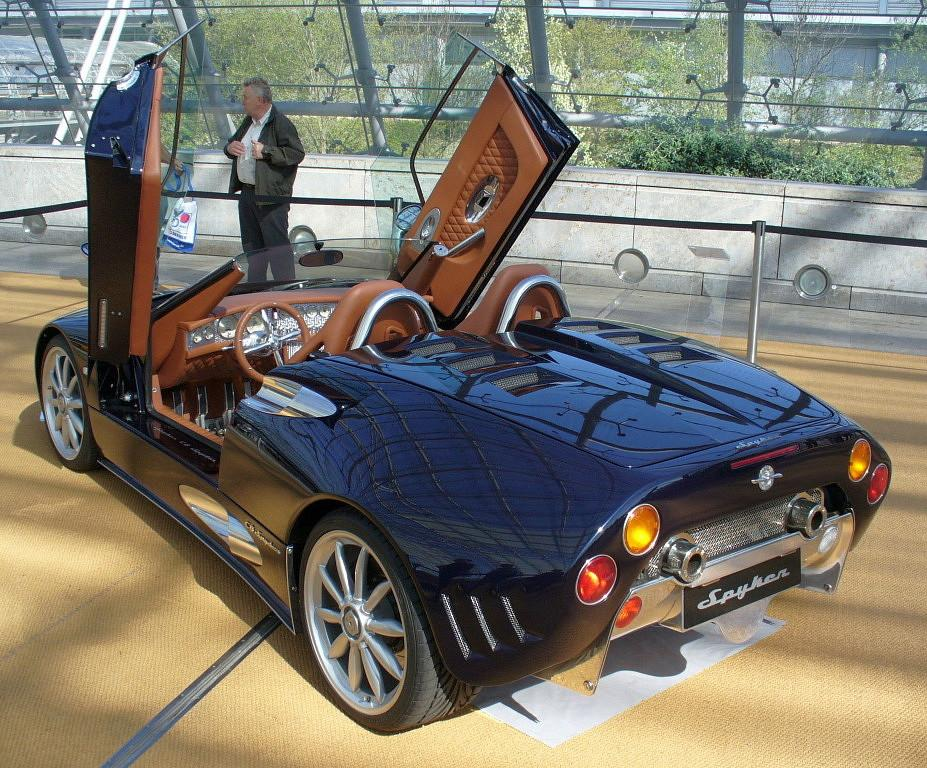
Spyker C8 Spyder rear

== Second generation (2009–2018) ==
=== C8 Aileron Concept (2008) ===
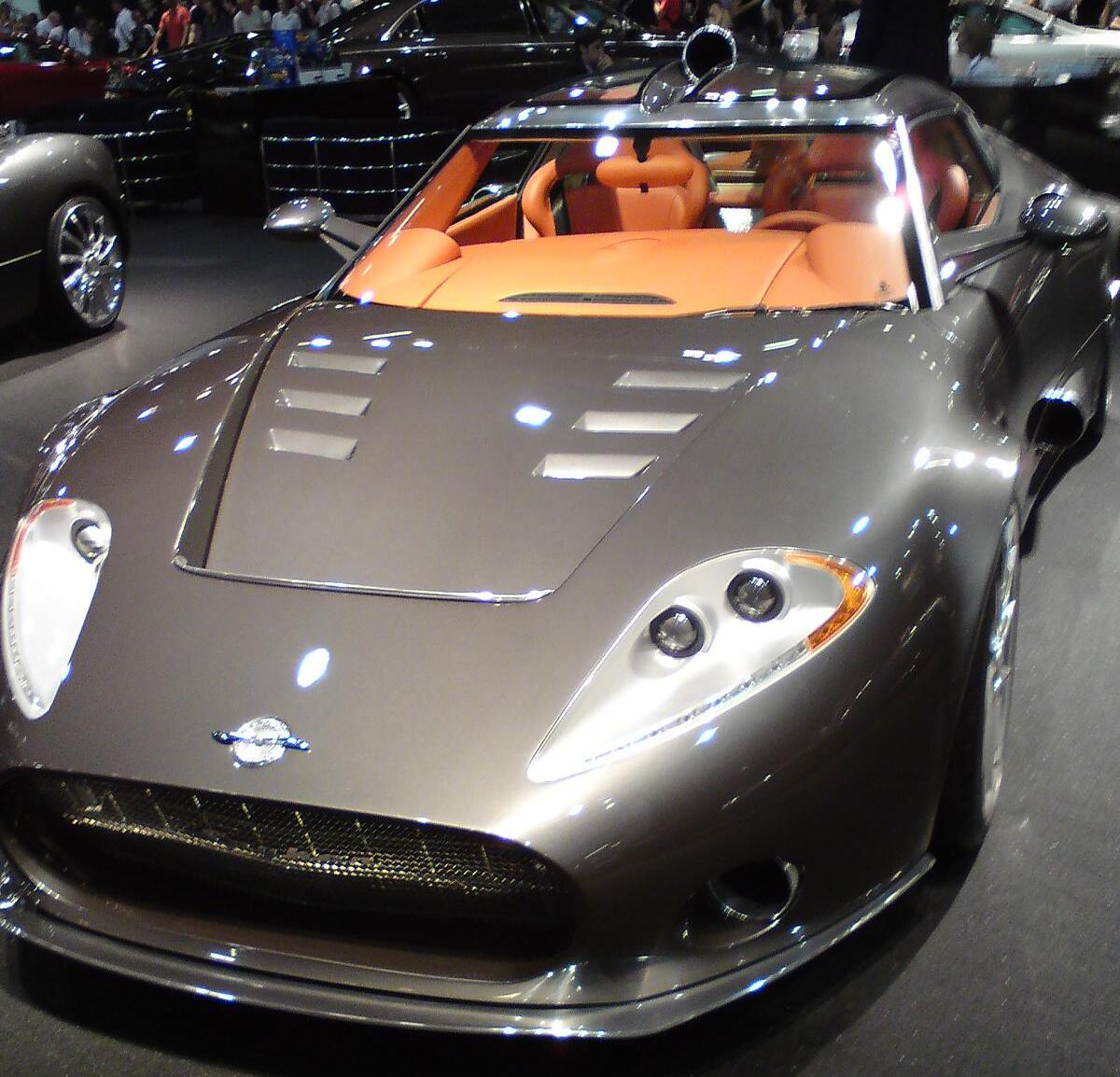
C8 Aileron Concept

Before the 2008 Geneva Motor Show, the company announced the C8 Laviolette LWB, but the car unveiled was called the C8 Aileron. It had the long wheelbase of the C8 Double 12S (2.67 m), but its bodywork was somewhat similar to the upcoming Aileron (2009). The modified Double 12S chassis featured a suspension layout similar to that of the future Aileron, with double wishbones and vertical shock absorbers. A single example was built because these long-wheelbase Double 12S chassis were rarer and more outdated, and because work was underway on a fully-fledged second-generation C8 Aileron (2009) - a heavily reengineered version with a 2.72 m wheelbase. The exhibition example was not running and was later converted into a right-hand drive customer car.

=== Aileron (2009–2016) ===
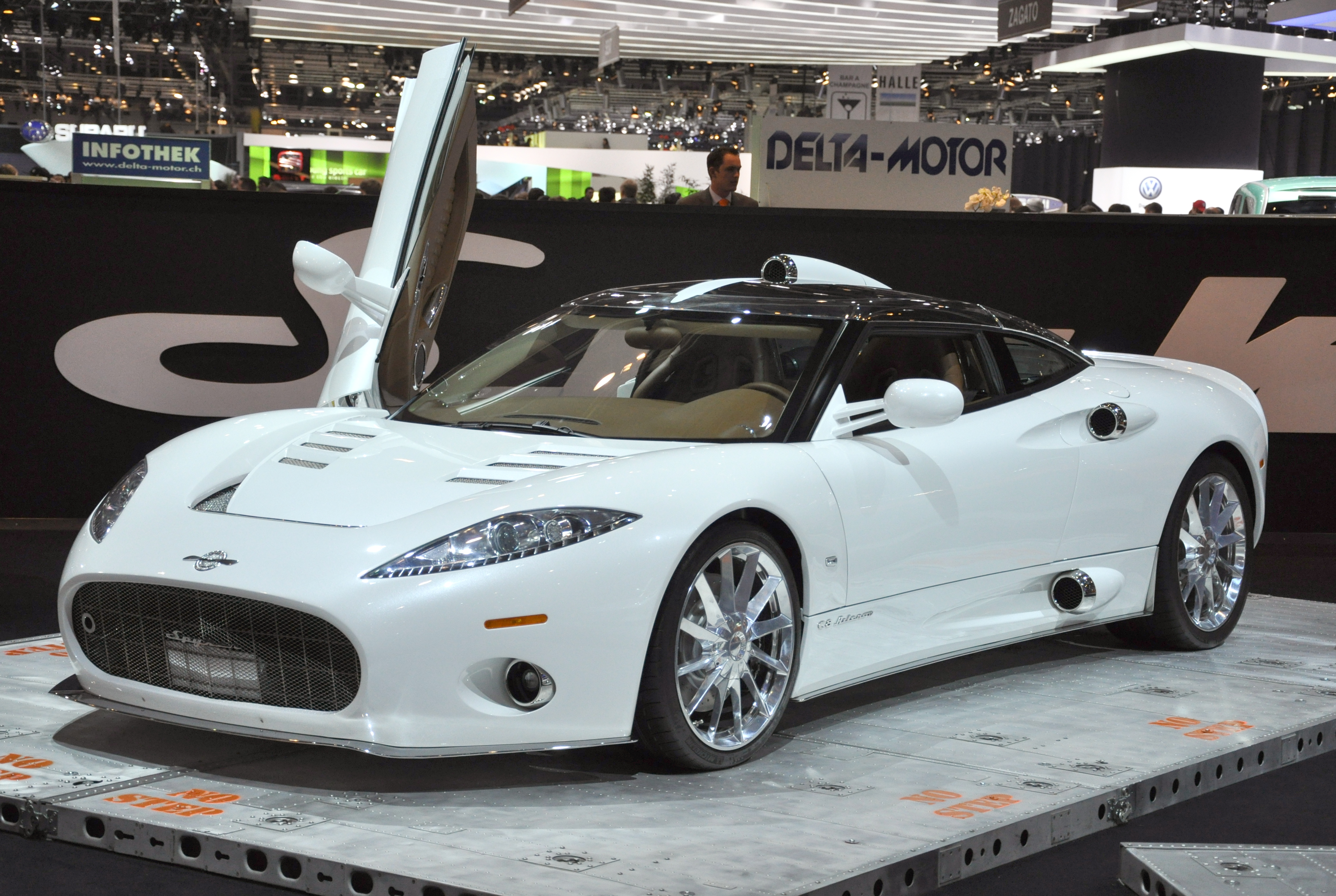
C8 Aileron

At the 2009 Geneva Motor Show, Spyker debuted the C8 Aileron, described by the company as the second generation of their C8 sports car, to replace the Laviolette. Though still equipped with the same 4.2L Audi V8 from the Spyder and Laviolette, the Aileron features a longer, wider body, and, for the first time in the C8, an optional ZF automatic transmission. Continuing with the aviation themes of previous C8 cars, the Aileron's wheel design is inspired by jet turbine blades, a motif that can be seen throughout the car's aluminum construction and interior.

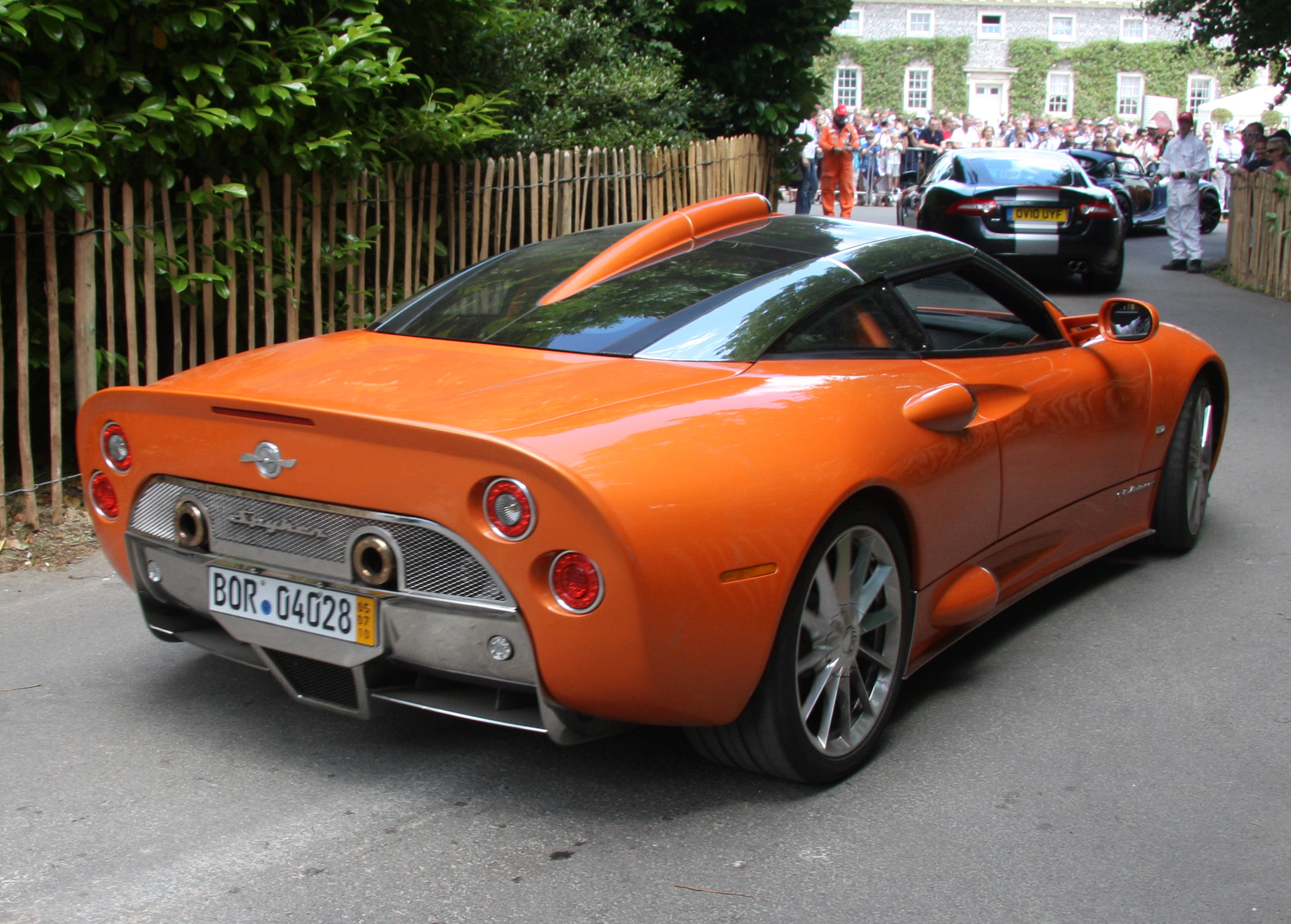
C8 Aileron rear

The name 'Aileron' is a reference to the flight control surface of the same name, a nod to the company's history in aviation.

=== Aileron Spyder (2009–2016) ===
A Spyker C8 Aileron pulling away from the start of the Goodwood Festival of Speed hillclimb in 2009.

A convertible version of the C8 Aileron was unveiled later in 2009 at the Pebble Beach Concours d'Elegance. Aside from the retractable roof, the dimensions and powertrain of the Aileron Spyder are identical to those of the standard Aileron. The Aileron Spyder would replace the original C8 Spyder, which had been in production since 2000.

=== Aileron LM85 (2018) ===
To commemorate the end of the production of C8 Aileron models with the introduction of the Preliator, Spyker built three Aileron LM85 cars. As with the previous Laviolette LM85s, the Aileron LM85s are styled after the Spyker racing livery, though each of the three Aileron LM85 examples produced came with a distinct color scheme. The LM85 is the only Aileron model to feature Spyker's more powerful 4.2L supercharged Audi V8 producing 525 hp (391 kW; 532 PS).

In January 2026, a Spyker enthusiast named Jasper den Dopper, along with Luxembourgish coachbuilder Milan Moraday and German tuner R Company, managed to revive the Spyker Aileron LM85 in which the company originally conceived many years ago but never finalized.

== Third generation (2016–present) ==
=== Preliator (2016–present) ===
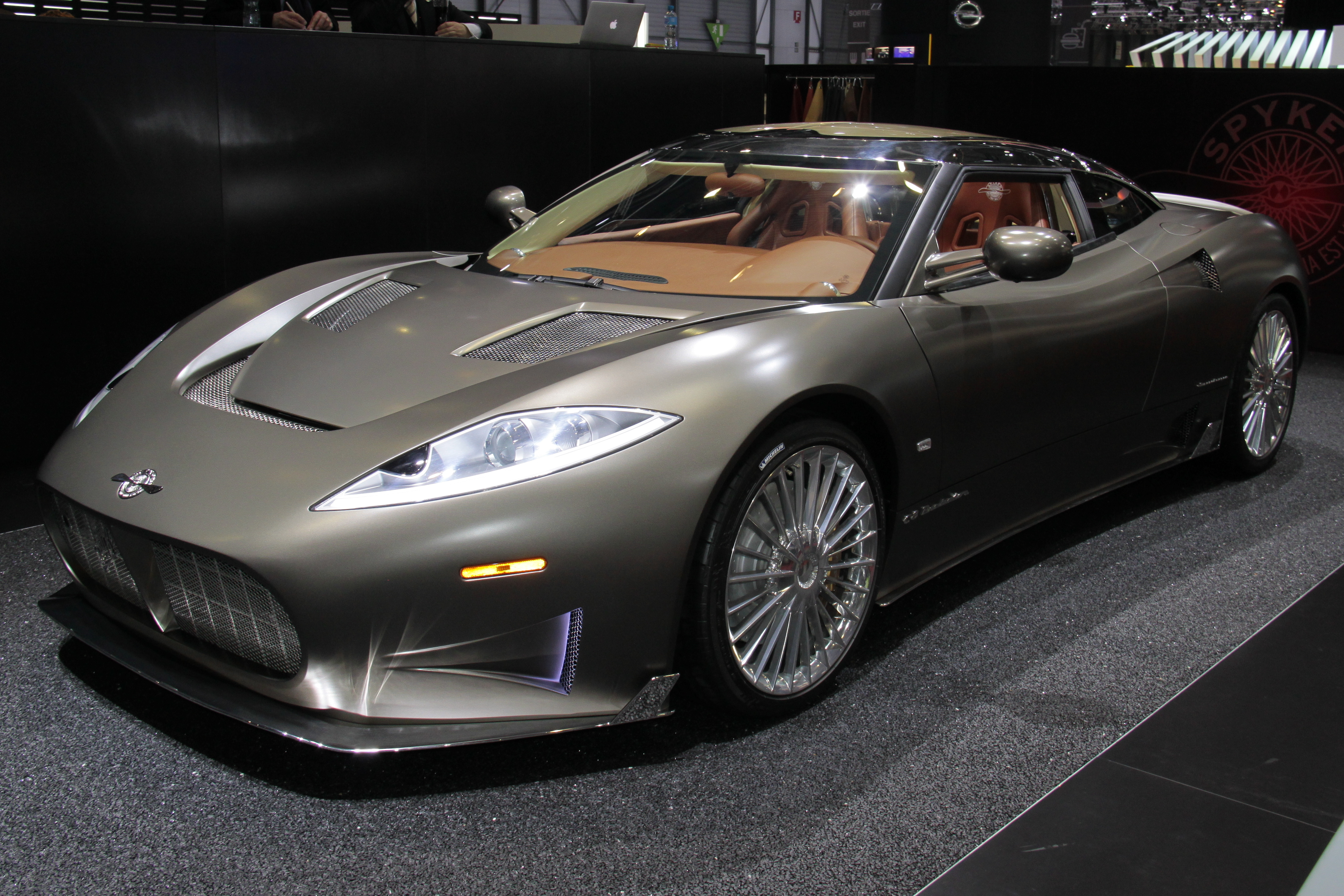
C8 Preliator

The C8 Preliator was officially announced at the 2016 Geneva Motor Show as the third generation C8 sportscar, replacing the Aileron. Though originally Spyker had planned to produce the Preliator with a 5.0L V8 engine supplied by Koenigsegg, in 2018 this deal was called off. Instead, the Preliator will use a 4.2L supercharged Audi V8 producing 525 PS (386 kW; 518 hp), resulting in a 0–100 km/h (0–62 mph) time of 3.7 seconds and a top speed of 322 km/h (200 mph). The car comes with a choice of a 6-speed Getrag manual or a 6 speed ZF automatic transmission. As with previous Spyker models, the car has typical aviation inspired design elements such as NACA styled air-inlets. Driver technology has been upgraded as well compared to previous models, with the C8 Preliator gaining a heads-up display and Bluetooth connectivity for phones.

The name 'Preliator' likely comes from the Latin word proeliator, meaning "fighter".

=== Preliator Spyder (2017–present) ===
The following year at the 2017 Geneva Motor Show, Spyker unveiled the Preliator Spyder to replace the outgoing Aileron Spyder model. Though introduced with the Koenigsegg V8 producing 600 hp (447 kW; 608 PS), due to the termination of the engine deal the Spyder will also use the Preliator's 4.2L supercharged Audi V8.

=== Preliator XXV Coupé (2026-present) ===
Spyker Cars officially debuted the Preliator XXV Coupé on August 14, 2026, at 10:40 AM PST during its world reveal at The Quail by The Peninsula, A Motorsports Gathering in Carmel, California. The Preliator XXV Coupé comes with an 4.0-liter twin-turbocharged Audi V8 engine with 800 hp (811 PS; 597 kW) and a 6-speed manual transmission. It accelerates from 0-62 (0–100 km/h) in 2.7 seconds and has a claimed top speed exceeding 217 mph (350 km/h). Production of the Preliator XXV will be limited to just 25 units.

== Racing ==
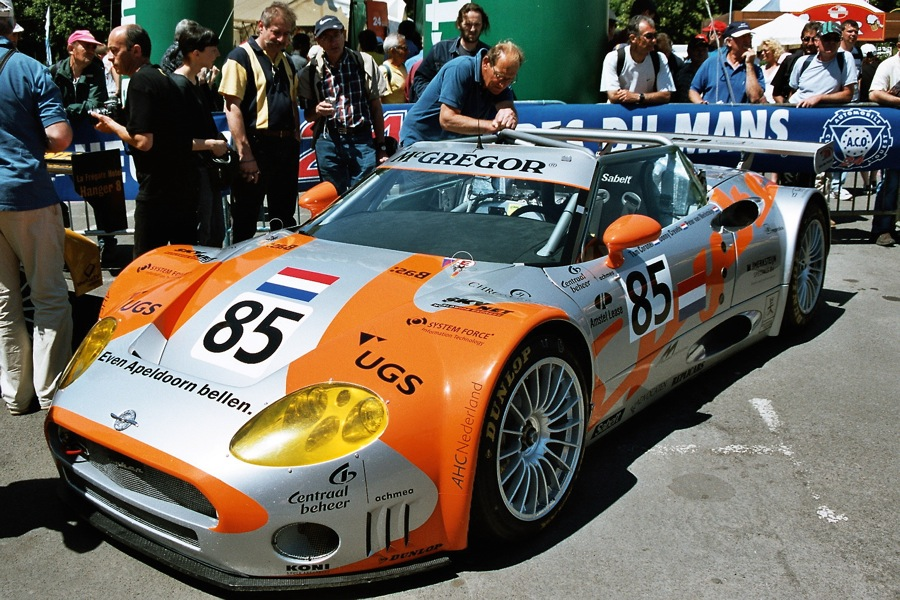
One of two C8 Spyder GT2-Rs at the 2006 24 Hours of Le Mans.

=== Double 12R (2001–2003) ===
The Double 12R was a version of the C8 developed specifically for the 24 hours of Le Mans, using a Mader BMW V8 racing engine with a displacement of 4.0L and power output of 487 PS (358 kW; 480 hp). The Double 12R debuted shortly after the Laviolette at the 2001 IAA in Frankfurt. The Double 12R's first race was the 2002 12 Hours of Sebring, though an accident prevented the car from finishing. It also participated in the 2003 24 Hours of Le Mans and several other endurance races.

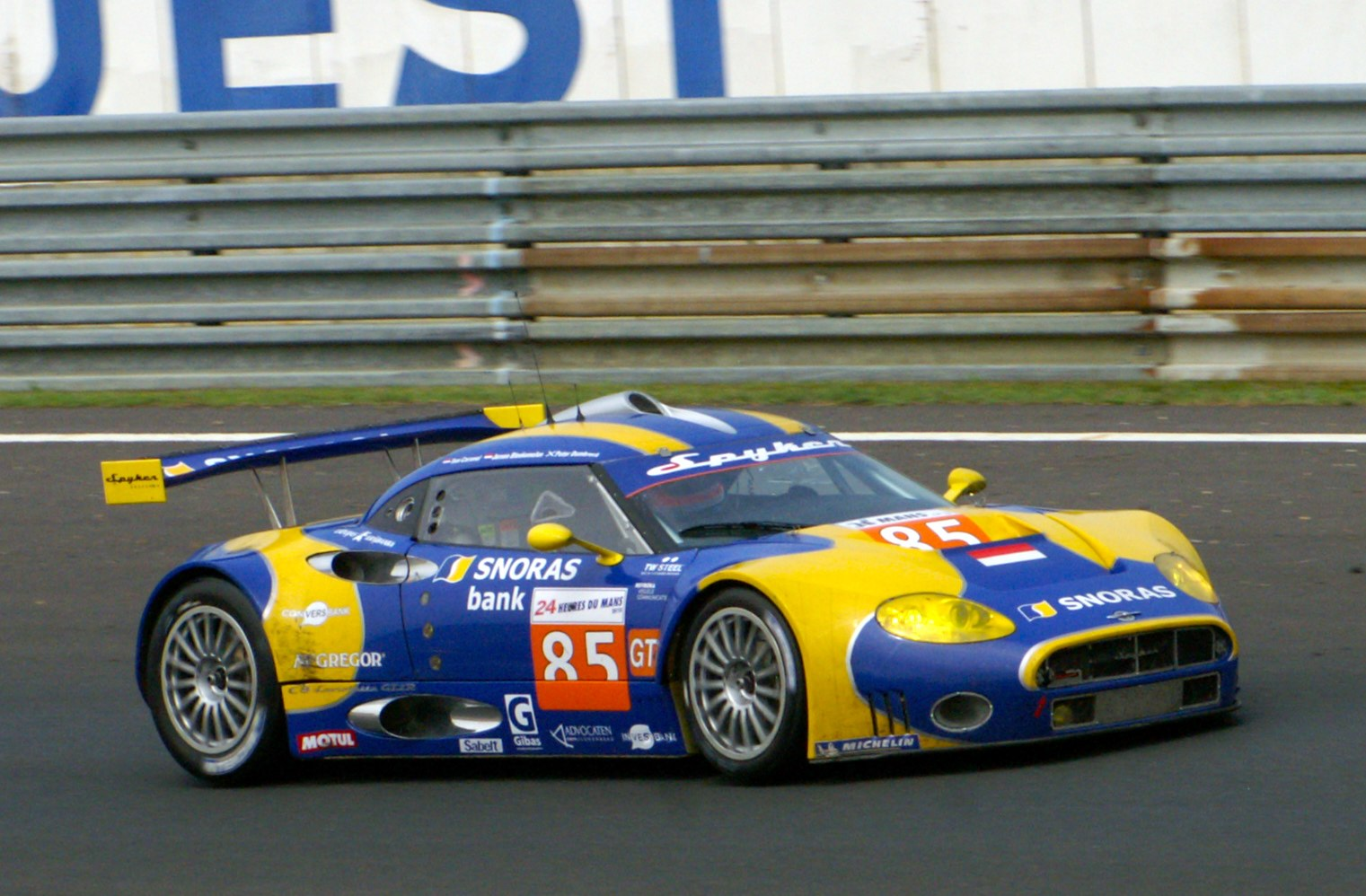
C8 Laviolette GT2-R at 2010 24 Hours of Le Mans

=== Spyder GT2-R (2005–2008) ===
The Spyder GT2-R represented Spyker's next generation of racing car, succeeding the Double 12R in 2005 in its debut at the 12 Hours of Sebring. The GT2-R featured a racing version of the road car's V8, now displacing 3.8L and producing 456 PS (335 kW; 450 hp).

=== Laviolette GT2-R (2008–2010) ===
Spyker followed the introduction of the Laviolette LWB in 2008 with a replacement for the Spyder GT2-R race car. The Laviolette GT2-R debuted at the 2008 24 Hours of Le Mans with a 4.0L V8 version of the engine seen previously in the Spyder GT2-R.

== Specifications ==
=== Chassis ===
Every incarnation of the C8 from the Spyder to the Preliator is built on an aluminum spaceframe chassis, although through the generations the original chassis has been stiffened and lengthened to accommodate the longer wheelbase and optional automatic transmission. The body panels for the first two C8 generations are also made out of aluminum, while the Preliator incorporates carbon fibre for all parts of the body except the hood and the deck for additional weight savings over the outgoing Aileron.

=== Suspension ===
All generations of C8 come equipped with double wishbone suspension at the front and rear axles. First generation C8 models used inboard Koni shock absorbers and components constructed from stainless steel and aluminum. Aileron and Preliator models adopted an updated suspension setup developed by Lotus, with an increase number of parts manufactured from forged aluminum and new mono-tube dampers.

=== Wheels ===
Generation	Wheel type	Material	Size	Tires	Code (F)	Code (R)	Brakes	Size (F)	Size (R)
I	ATS 'Aeroblade' (optional)	Forged alloy Magnesium	18" 19"	Dunlop Sport	225/40ZR 18 225/35ZR 19	255/35ZR 18 255/30ZR 19	Ventilated discs	356 mm	330 mm
II	Standard 'Rotorblade' (optional)	Alloy Forged alloy	19"	Michelin Pilot Sport	235/35ZR 19	265/30ZR 19	Ventilated discs Carbon ceramic discs (optional)	350 mm	332 mm
III	Standard 'Turbofan' (optional)	Alloy Forged alloy	19"	Michelin Pilot Sport	235/35ZR 19	295/30ZR 19	Ventilated discs Carbon ceramic discs (optional)	350 mm	332 mm

=== Powertrains and performance ===
Model	Engine	Power	Torque	Kerb weight	0–60 mph (0–97 km/h)	Top speed
Spyder	4.2L V8	400 PS (294 kW; 395 hp)	480 N⋅m (354 lb⋅ft)	1,250 kg (2,756 lb)	4.5s	300 km/h (186 mph)
Spyder T	4.2L turbocharged V8	525 PS (386 kW; 518 hp)	560 N⋅m (413 lb⋅ft)	1,315 kg (2,899 lb)	3.9s	320 km/h (199 mph)
Laviolette	4.2L V8	400 PS (294 kW; 395 hp)	480 N⋅m (354 lb⋅ft)	1,275 kg (2,811 lb)	4.5s	300 km/h (186 mph)
Laviolette LWB	4.2L V8	400 PS (294 kW; 395 hp)	480 N⋅m (354 lb⋅ft)	1,350 kg (2,976 lb)	4.5s	300 km/h (186 mph)
Laviolette LM85	4.2L V8	400 PS (294 kW; 395 hp)	480 N⋅m (354 lb⋅ft)	1,275 kg (2,811 lb)	4.5s	300 km/h (186 mph)
Double 12S	4.0L V8	400 PS (294 kW; 395 hp) to 620 PS (456 kW; 612 hp)	480 N⋅m (354 lb⋅ft)	1,350 kg (2,976 lb)	3.8–4.5s	300–345 km/h (186–214 mph)
Aileron	4.2L V8	400 PS (294 kW; 395 hp)	480 N⋅m (354 lb⋅ft)	1,425 kg (3,142 lb)	4.5s	300 km/h (186 mph)
Aileron Spyder	4.2L V8	400 PS (294 kW; 395 hp)	480 N⋅m (354 lb⋅ft)	1,425 kg (3,142 lb)	4.5s	300 km/h (186 mph)
Aileron LM85	4.2L supercharged V8	525 PS (386 kW; 518 hp)	600 N⋅m (443 lb⋅ft)	1,425 kg (3,142 lb)	3.7s	322 km/h (200 mph)
Preliator	4.2L supercharged V8	525 PS (386 kW; 518 hp)	600 N⋅m (443 lb⋅ft)	1,390 kg (3,064 lb)	3.7s	324 km/h (201 mph)
Preliator Spyder	4.2L supercharged V8	525 PS (386 kW; 518 hp)	600 N⋅m (443 lb⋅ft)	1,390 kg (3,064 lb)	3.7s	324 km/h (201 mph)

== In popular culture ==
A C8 Spyder appeared in Season 4 episode 7 of Top Gear (UK) driven by Jeremy Clarkson and The Stig.

The Spyker C8 Laviolette has been featured in movies such as Basic Instinct 2, War and Fast & Furious 6. It also appeared in "Rizzoli & Isles" Money for Nothing episode. The Spyker C8 was also featured in a 2010 commercial for Reese's Puffs.

The C8 has also been featured in a number of video games, including:

Model	Videogames
C8 Laviolette	Gran Turismo 4, Gran Turismo 5, Gran Turismo 6, Gran Turismo Concept 2002 Tokyo-Geneva, Project Gotham Racing 4, Test Drive Unlimited
C8 Laviolette LM85	Forza Motorsport 3, Forza Motorsport 4
C8 Spyder	Test Drive Unlimited
C8 Spyder GT2R-R	Race Pro, Race Driver: Grid, GTR Evolution
C8 Double 12 S	Project Gotham Racing 3
C8 Aileron	Driveclub, Forza Motorsport 4, Test Drive Unlimited 2, The Crew, Smash Bandits Racing, The Crew 2
C8 Aileron Spyder	Test Drive Unlimited 2
C8 Preliator	Asphalt 8: Airborne, CSR Racing 2
