= Spyker Silvestris V8 =

Concept car developed by Spyker

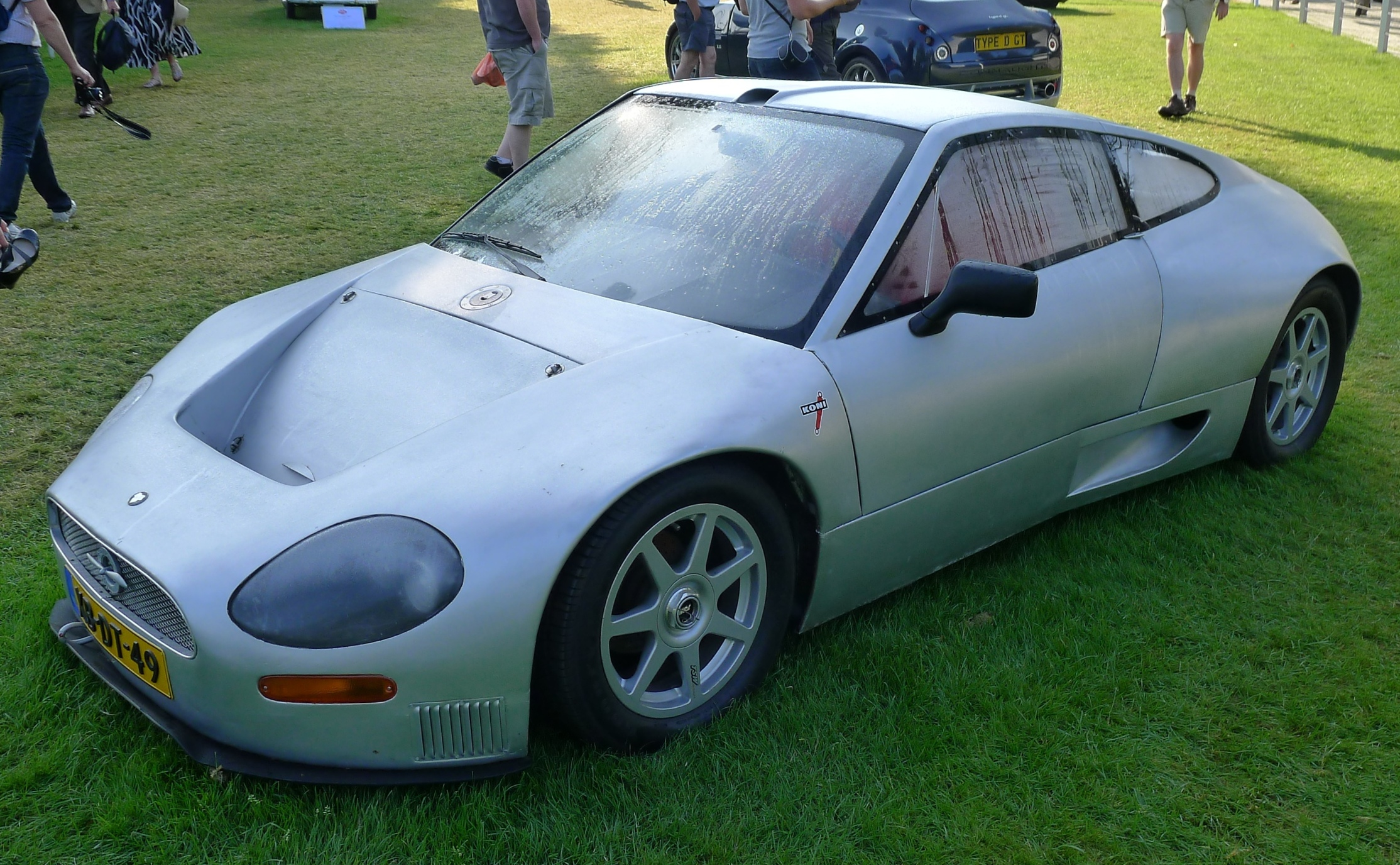

Overview
- Manufacturer: Spyker Cars
- Production: 1999 (1 produced)
- Designer: Maarten de Bruijn

Body and chassis
- Class: Concept car
- Body style: 2-door coupé
- Layout: RMR Layout
- Doors: Scissor

Powertrain
- Engine: 3562 cc (3.6L) Audi V8
- Power output: 198 kW (269 PS, 265 bhp)
- Transmission: 5-speed manual

Dimensions
- Length: 4,050 mm (159 in)
- Width: 1,880 mm (74 in)
- Height: 1,170 mm (46 in)
- Curb weight: 960 kg (2,120 lb)

Chronology
- Successor: Spyker C8

The Spyker Silvestris V8 is a Dutch mid-engine sports car introduced in 1999 as a prototype for what would later become the Spyker C8. The Silvestris was the first new model from Spyker since it declared bankruptcy in 1929 and it hailed a return of the once prestigious brand. The Silvestris was hand built by Maarten de Bruijn, co-founder of Spyker, and it debuted at the 1999 Goodwood Festival of Speed. The car is reportedly still owned by de Bruijn.

== Performance ==
The Silvestris is powered by a 3,562 cc (3.6 L) Audi DOHC V8 producing 265 bhp (198 kW). Power is sent to the rear wheels through an Audi sourced 5-speed manual transmission. The Silvestris is built on a basic central monocoque made of steel, with a tubular frame in the front and back, and features scissor doors. The car can accelerate from 0–100 km/h (0–62 mph) in 4.5 seconds and is claimed to be able to reach 250 km/h (155 mph).

== History ==
The Silvestris is the brainchild of Maarten de Bruijn, a town and country planner with experience in metal working. De Bruijn's dream was to start his own sports car factory, which led him to create the Silvestris. Before beginning on the project De Bruijn purchased all of the rights to the Spyker brand and logo for use on his car. The car debuted at the 1999 Goodwood Festival of Speed and was met with many positive reactions, notably from car collector and entrepreneur Victor Muller. Muller provided financial backing to bring the concept to production, becoming co-founder of the now reborn Spyker Cars alongside De Bruijn. With Muller's funding the Silvestris was developed into the Spyker C8 which debuted in 2000, a car which shared some styling cues and functional elements with the prototype but had undergone substantial changes in a variety of areas.
