= Maarten de Bruijn =

Dutch engineer

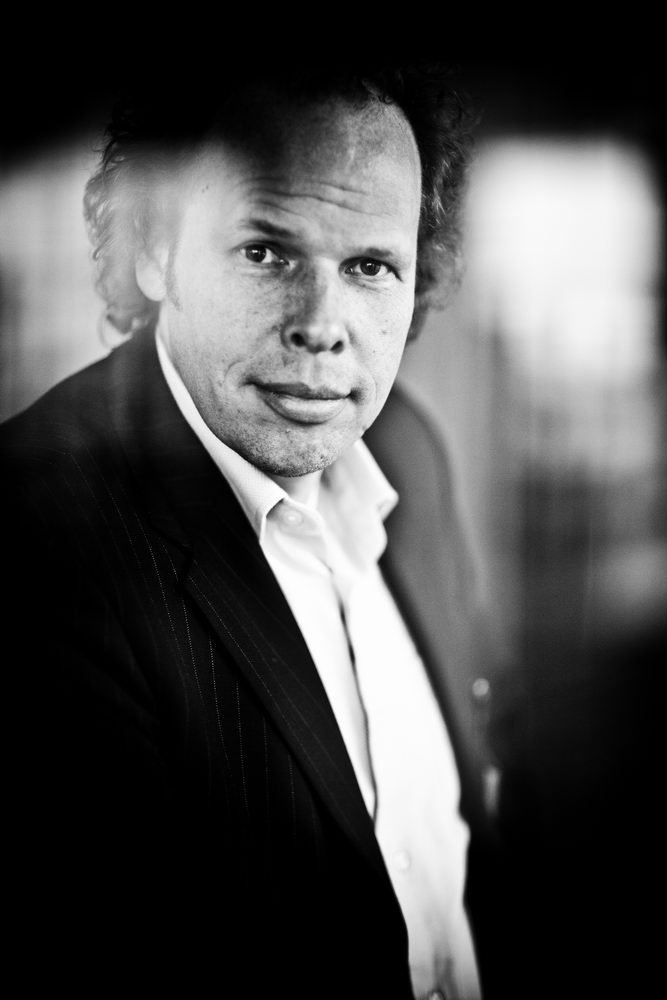
Maarten de Bruijn @ Auto(r) 2010 Photo: Laurent Nivalle

Maarten de Bruijn (Dutch pronunciation: [ˈmaːrtə(n) də ˈbrœyn]; born 1965) is a Dutch designer, engineer, and entrepreneur. He designs, engineers, and builds vehicles that he subsequently takes into production.

== Early life ==
Born in Naarden, he graduated in 1996 at University of Amsterdam with a master's degree in city planning. From 1990 to 1996, he designed, constructed, and made a functional prototype Spyker Silvestris V8. In 1999 he co-founded with Victor Muller company Spyker Cars for the production of sports cars. De Bruijn designed and styled Spyker C8 Spyder (2000), Spyker C8 Laviolette (2001), Spyker C8 Double (2002). In 2005 he left Spyker and co-founded the company Silvestris Haute Motive Concepts. In 2010 he was a guest speaker at the Auto(r) automotive design conference.

== Career ==
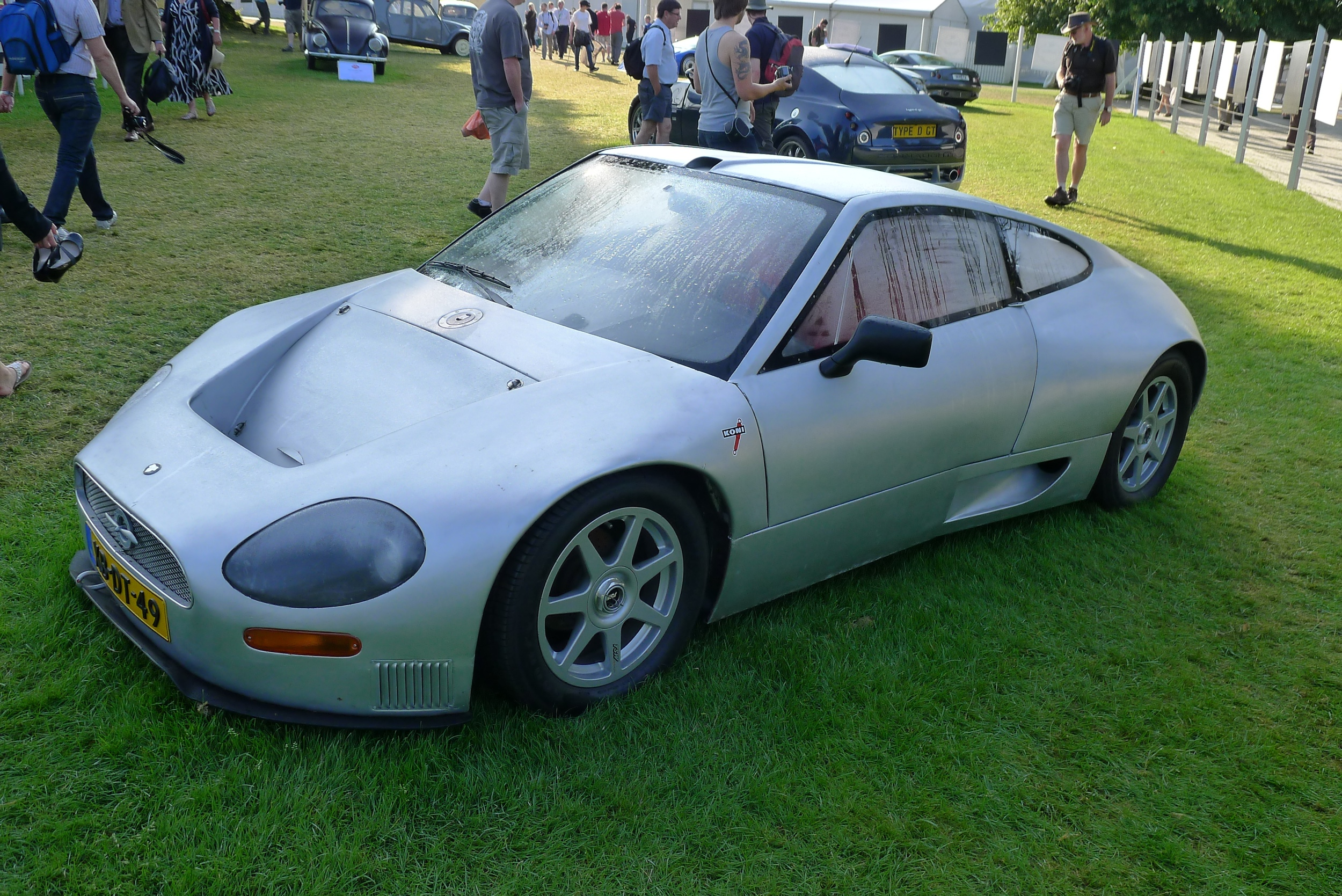
Spyker Silvestris V8

Maarten de Bruijn began his career in 1990, developing a lightweight, mid-engined sports car prototype. He subsequently registered the historical Dutch brand name Spyker and designated the vehicle the Spyker Silvestris V8.

In 1999, Victor Muller became the company's first customer. De Bruijn relocated operations to Coventry, United Kingdom, where he refined the design and established production facilities adjacent to CPP, a sheet metal workshop. Over the following two years, he designed and manufactured three models derived from his original prototype: the Spyker C8 Spyder, the Spyker C8 Laviolette, and the Spyker C8 Double Twelve.

The Spyker C8 Spyder received the Design Award for Engineering Excellence at the 2000 Birmingham Motor Show.

In 2001, Muller acquired a 50% share of Spyker Automobielen BV and assumed the CEO role.

De Bruijn departed from Spyker and divested his shares in 2005. He subsequently founded Silvestris Aquamotive with two former Spyker employees. The company developed an aluminum speedboat incorporating a patented construction method derived from automotive and aircraft technology. The vessel featured an aluminum space frame with bonded and riveted aluminum skin, producing a rigid hull structure. Notable design elements included a retractable interior system in which seating and dashboard components could be concealed mechanically.

In 2007, De Bruijn received a nomination for the Maritime Innovation Award for the boat's construction methodology. Production continued until economic conditions deteriorated in 2009.

In 2014, De Bruijn sold the Silvestris boat design to Aston Martin. The company developed prototypes designated the Aston Martin AM37, though the vessel did not enter series production. Design elements from De Bruijn's original Silvestris concept remain evident in the AM37's final configuration.

In 2010, inspired by Segway, he worked on creating a personal electric vehicle called the Qugo. The Qugo had three wheels to keep it upright, it used a patented tilting mechanism. The Qugo could carve like a skier and was claimed to be fun to drive.

De Bruijn won first prize at the Goodwood Festival Of Speed Cartier Award in 2011 in the class 'Come Back Kids' for successfully reviving an old brand, Spyker Cars.

In 2012, De Bruijn designed and built a few alternative vehicles, including a high-end three-wheeled wheelchair with an innovative suspension construction that increased the level of comfort and maneuverability. De Bruijn sold the idea to a Dutch wheelchair company, but they never launched it.

In 2021 he set up an automotive company with partners Wouter van Everdingen and Niek van Exel. The brand carries his name, deBruynCars.

In May 2023, De Bruijn launched his new "deBruyn" car: the deBruyn FEROX V8. This is synonymous with Silvestris and means 'fiery'. This model was the next level of the Spyker C8 Spyder. Completely re-engineered and closer to the original vision: natural aspirated V8 in a handcrafted, true lightweight aluminum roadster body, with a "De Bruijn design- signature". Instead of the old Audi 4.2 V8, the FEROX uses a 6.2 l V8.
