= Spyker E12 =

Overview
- Manufacturer: Spyker Cars
- Also called: Spyker E8
- Production: TBA

Body and chassis
- Class: Concept Saloon/Sports Coupé
- Layout: Front-engine, rear-wheel-drive
- Doors: Conventional doors (front)/Coach Doors (rear)

Powertrain
- Engine: 6.0 L VW Group W12 (E12); 5.0 L Koenigsegg V8 (E8)
- Transmission: 6-speed manual

Spyker Cars shareholder and CEO, Victor Muller hinted at a Maserati Quattroporte, Aston Martin Rapide, and Bentley Flying Spur rival with an eight-cylinder (the E8) or a twelve-cylinder (the E12) engine, but due to problems getting the D8 into production, the idea was ignored until recently when Muller has said he "believes now could be the time to resurrect the saloon." Muller believes it will take about four years from time E8/E12 is revealed to the time it starts production. In March 2011, Muller stated that the production version of the Spyker E8/E12 would use a twelve-cylinder instead of the proposed eight-cylinder engine.
