= Alex Mascioli =

American businessman and investor (born 1975)

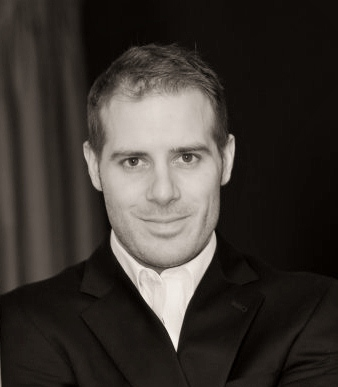
- Born: August 30, 1975 (age 50); Ponce, Puerto Rico
- Occupation: Investment Banking
- Employer: North Street Capital, LP

Alex Mascioli is an American businessman and investor. He is the founder and managing partner of North Street Capital, LP which invests in leveraged buyouts and public and private equity.

== Business career ==
Mascioli has been involved in Dutch automaker Spyker Cars and Swedish automaker Saab automobile. Mascioli and Saab Chairman & CEO Victor Muller came to a deal in which North Street would acquire the sports car maker Spyker from Swedish Automobile, which began to struggle financially with Saab, for $43.5 million in cash, and the proceeds would be used to pay off company debt. Shortly afterwards another deal was struck in which Alex Mascioli would pay $70 million to buy shares of Saab and issue a convertible note of $60 million collateralized by Saab's assets. In 2011, the press reported that Mascioli might take over 100% of Saab and in an interview with Reuters it was mentioned that he had the capacity to take over the company should he chose to do so.

== Media ==
Mascioli has been published in magazines featured as "On The Road With Alex Mascioli" for articles relating to automakers which include Audi, Bentley, BMW, Maserati, Mercedes, and Jaguar.
