= North Street Capital, LP =

American hedge fund

- Company type: LP
- Industry: Private equity, Hedge fund
- Founder: Alex Mascioli
- Headquarters: Greenwich, Connecticut, U.S.
- Website: www.NorthStreetLP.com

North Street Capital, LP is a privately owned private equity and hedge fund firm based in Greenwich, Connecticut. The firm is run by Alex Mascioli, who founded the firm and is named after a street in town. The firm invests in leveraged buyouts and public and private equity. Mascioli is the company's managing partner and chief executive officer.

== History ==
North Street Capital has been involved in Dutch automaker Spyker Cars, Swedish automaker SAAB Automobile and Amsterdam listed Swedish Automobile N.V. (NYSE Euronext 'SWAN.AS') (The parent company to Spyker & SAAB). Alex Mascioli and SAAB Chairman & CEO Victor Muller came to a deal in which North Street would acquire the sports car maker Spyker from Swedish Automobile, which began to struggle financially with SAAB, for $43.5 million in cash, and the proceeds would be used to pay off company debt. Shortly after the Spyker deal was announced, SAAB Automobile came into a large liquidity problem when two Chinese automakers hadn't paid their agreed investment into the Swedish company. As a result, Muller and North Street Capital struck another deal in which Alex Mascioli would pay $70 million to buy 2.38 million shares of SAAB and issue a convertible note of $60 million collateralized by SAAB's assets.

In 2011, there were some press reports that Mascioli might take over 100% of SAAB after a Chinese investment deal fell through, and in an interview with Reuters, it was mentioned that he had the capacity to take over the company should he choose to do so.

While the above deals were announced, none actually happened. Then SAAB CEO Victor Muller came to the conclusion that the offers were not real.

North Street Capital in 2012 made an offer for Winnebago, which was not received as a serious offer. Mascoli's criminal record was stated as a concern by Winnebago.
