= Spyker B6 =

Spyker B6 Venator
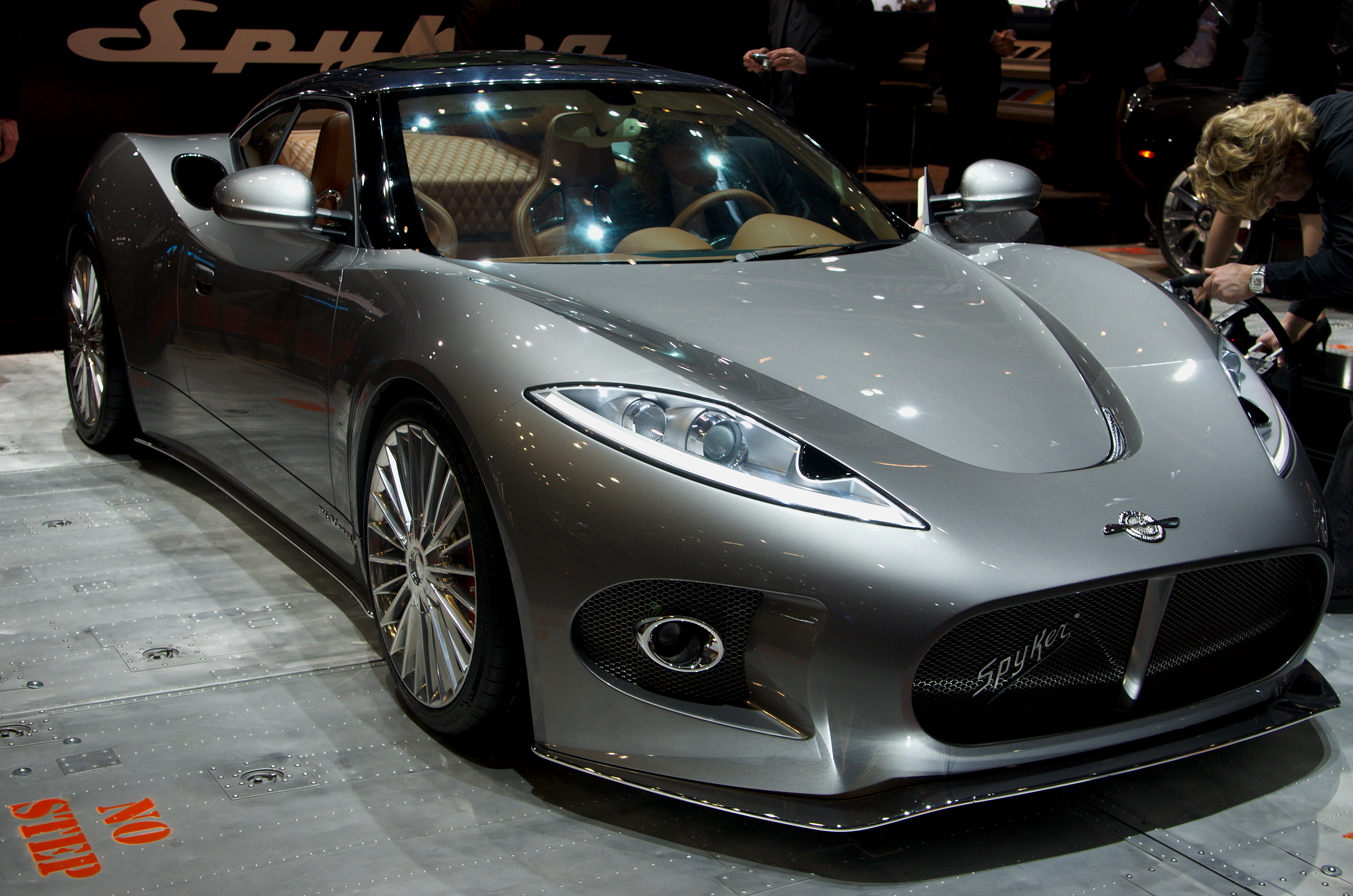

Overview
- Manufacturer: Spyker Cars
- Also called: Spyker B6 Venator
- Production: 2013 (concept car); 2014 (planned)

Body and chassis
- Class: Concept Sports car
- Body style: 2-door coupe (Spyker B6 Venator Coupe); 2-door Spyder (Spyker B6 Venator Spyder)
- Layout: Transverse Mounted RMR layout
- Related: Artega GT

Powertrain
- Engine: 3.5L Lotus-built 2GR-FE V6
- Power output: 280 kW (380 PS; 380 bhp)
- Transmission: 6-speed automatic

Dimensions
- Wheelbase: 2,500 mm (98.4 in)
- Length: 4,347 mm (171.1 in)
- Width: 1,882 mm (74.1 in)

The Spyker B6 Venator is a concept car built by Dutch manufacturer Spyker Cars and first shown to the public at the Geneva Motor Show in April 2013. It was planned for production by 2014.

The mid engined, rear-wheel drive concept is powered by a yet-to-be specified V6 engine, producing 375 bhp (280 kW; 380 PS), mated to a six-speed automatic.

The B6 is thought to be based on the Artega GT which ceased production in 2012 due to bankruptcy. This has not been confirmed by Spyker.
