= Alexander Radunsky =

Alex Radunsky
- Born: 1958 (age 67–68); Minsk, Byelorussian SSR, Soviet Union
- Citizenship: United States
- Occupations: Entrepreneur; Investor
- Known for: Co-owner and managing partner of Midland F1 Racing

Alex Radunsky (also Alexander Mikhailovich Radunsky; born 1958) is an American entrepreneur and investor. From 2004 to 2006, he was a co-owner and managing partner of the Midland F1 Racing Formula One team. His business activities have included the consumer-goods distributor Terra, real-estate company Perga Development, the food producer Corrado Group, and the US healthcare marketplace Tripment Health.

== Biography ==
Radunsky was born in 1958. In September 2005, GQ included him in its list of the "100 Most Stylish Men in Russia" and gave his age as 46.

In late August 1989, Radunsky emigrated from the Soviet Union to the United States with his family as a refugee. According to his personal website, he spent six months in Europe while awaiting permission to enter the United States and arrived in Des Moines, Iowa, in February 1990. He states that he founded an import-export company in 1991. He later settled in the United States.

In 2017, Radunsky sold an apartment in Chicago's Park Tower for $4.35 million. Crain's Chicago Business reported that it was the largest condominium sale in Chicago since the beginning of that year.

== Business activities ==
=== Terra ===
During the 1990s, Radunsky was involved in the international distribution of consumer goods. By 2000, he was a co-owner of Terra, which Kommersant described as one of the largest distributors of Philip Morris cigarettes and products from other manufacturers in Russia and other CIS markets.

=== Midland F1 Racing ===
In December 2004, it was reported that Midland Group, owned by Canadian businessman Alex Shnaider, had reached an agreement to acquire the Formula One team Jordan Grand Prix. Radunsky was identified as a co-owner of the team and managing partner of the Midland F1 project.

At Radunsky's invitation, Boris Yeltsin Jr., grandson of former Russian president Boris Yeltsin, became head of the team's marketing department. The appointment was also reported by international and Russian media.

In January 2005, the team was renamed Midland F1 Racing. In February 2005, the team was presented at Vasilyevsky Spusk near Red Square in Moscow. Kommersant described Radunsky at the time as managing partner of Midland F1 and a co-owner of the racing team.

In April 2005, GQ published an article about Radunsky and Shnaider and their involvement with the Formula One team. In 2007, Midland's Formula One operation was sold to Spyker and was later acquired by Force India.

=== Perga Development and Management ===
In May 2008, Kommersant reported that Radunsky's company, Perga Development and Management, planned to develop approximately one million square metres of residential property and shopping centres in major cities in Russia and Ukraine. The planned investment was estimated at approximately US$1.2 billion.

In December 2010, Radunsky, then described as a co-owner of Perga Development, discussed plans to build about 7,000 automated roadside parking facilities with a combined capacity of approximately 84,000 vehicles.

In May 2011, Commercial Real Estate ranked Radunsky 27th in its CRE100 list of the "100 Most Influential People in Commercial Real Estate", identifying him as the principal shareholder of Perga Development. The publication also reported that Viva, a shopping and entertainment centre in Northern Butovo developed by Perga Development, received the Commercial Real Estate Awards Moscow 2011 award for Best Large Shopping Centre.

=== Corrado Group ===
In May 2008, Radunsky acquired the stake of his business partner and Corrado Group co-founder Alexander Bagiran in the company. At the time, Kommersant reported that Corrado Group accounted for approximately 15% of the Russian canned fruit and vegetable market through the Corrado, La Corra and Vilanta brands.

In 2012, Corrado Group entered the goat's-milk-based baby-food market with the Mamako brand.

In November 2013, Radunsky confirmed to Izvestia that negotiations were under way concerning a merger with the Dyadya Vanya holding company, also known as Ruspole Brands. The transaction was subsequently completed.

=== Tripment Health ===
In 2020, Radunsky founded Tripment Health in the United States, an online marketplace through which users can compare and purchase healthcare services, including radiology examinations, laboratory testing and telemedicine. Radiology Business reported that Radunsky developed the service after his insurer received an $18,500 hospital bill for an MRI.

In January 2022, Tripment Health announced a partnership with diagnostic imaging provider SimonMed.

In late 2021, MDsave sued Tripment Health, alleging patent infringement and copying of its business model. Radunsky disputed the allegations, saying that the claims had "no factual basis".

In February 2022, Tripment sought dismissal of MDsave's claims in a Texas court and separately filed an action in federal court in Delaware seeking a declaration that its activities did not infringe MDsave's patents or trademarks.

== Public activity ==
Radunsky operates a Russian-language YouTube channel covering entrepreneurship, economics and politics.
