= Spyker D8 =

Spyker D8/D12 Peking-to-Paris
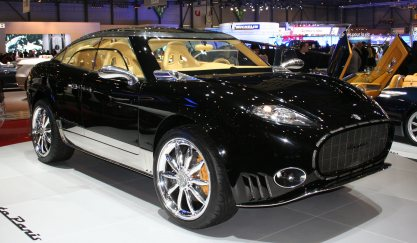

Overview
- Manufacturer: Spyker Cars
- Also called: Spyker D12
- Production: 2006 (D12 concept); 2008 (D8 concept); 2014 (planned)

Body and chassis
- Class: Concept mid-size luxury crossover SUV
- Body style: 5-door SUV
- Layout: Front-engine, four-wheel-drive
- Doors: Conventional doors (front)/Coach Doors (rear)

Powertrain
- Engine: 6.0 L VW Group W12 (2006-07 concept); 6.2 L GM supercharged V8 (2008 concept); 5.0 L Koenigsegg V8 (expected)
- Transmission: 6-speed manual

Dimensions
- Wheelbase: 2,855 mm (112.4 in)
- Length: 4,950 mm (194.9 in)
- Width: 2,000 mm (78.7 in)
- Height: 1,775 mm (69.9 in)
- Curb weight: 1,850 kg (4,079 lb) (est)

The Spyker D8 Peking-to-Paris is a concept mid-size luxury crossover SUV produced by the Dutch car manufacturer Spyker Cars. The car was designed by Michiel van den Brink and introduced at the 2006 Geneva Motor Show as the D12. With a change in proposed engine to a V8 Supercharger, the Peking-to-Paris was renamed D8 in 2008.

The name Peking-to-Paris refers to the Peking to Paris endurance rally held in 1907 from Peking (now called Beijing) in China to Paris in France, in which an almost standard Spyker car participated, driven by Frenchman Ch. Goddard. The Spyker car came in second in the rally after a three-month drive.

Although the D8 is a crossover SUV, it shares many design features found on Spyker's other sports cars such as the C8. Among these features are the D8's aluminum "aeroblade" wheels and one piece aluminum rear view mirrors. Also notable is that the back seat doors are hinged at the rear, giving the D8 suicide doors. Access to the trunk was through hinged doors.

== D12 ==
The D12 was initially shown to the public at the Geneva Motor Show in 2006 (chassis number #080). The black concept had a beige interior and was built to mock-up standards, had no B-pillar, no seat belts, and two-piece side windows (similar to the C8). Designed with a 500 bhp (373 kW; 507 PS) VW Group Volkswagen W12 engine, Spyker aims for a weight of 1,850 kg (4,079 lb) and acceleration from 0–100 km/h (0-62 mph) in 5.0 seconds. After its introduction in Geneva, the model had reportedly already received "well over 100 orders".

== D8 ==
At the 2007 Geneva Motor Show, another D12 concept car was presented, in grey with an orange interior (chassis number #194). Despite the general level of the concept, it already showed signs of development of a design for serial production. The glazing has been changed to suit the production model, the side windows have become one-piece, a central pillar (lower part) has appeared, and different seats with seat belts have been installed. Access to the luggage space was possible not only through hinged doors, but also through opening glass. A year later, a white concept with the same interior was shown in Geneva. This time it was called the D8 and had a supercharged V8, presumably from GM. It is believed that this was the same 2007 concept #194 in a different color. The air intakes on the hood and the design of the wheels were executed in the same design as the 2008 C8 Aileron concept presented there.

At a press conference held at the Geneva Motor Show on March 2, 2010, Spyker's CEO Victor Muller indicated that the development of the car could now be assisted by Saab, which Spyker briefly owned. The car was still under development at the time and had potential for production by 2014.

Following a series of financial woes, plans were put forward in 2017 to use the Koenigsegg V8 engine.

== Gallery ==
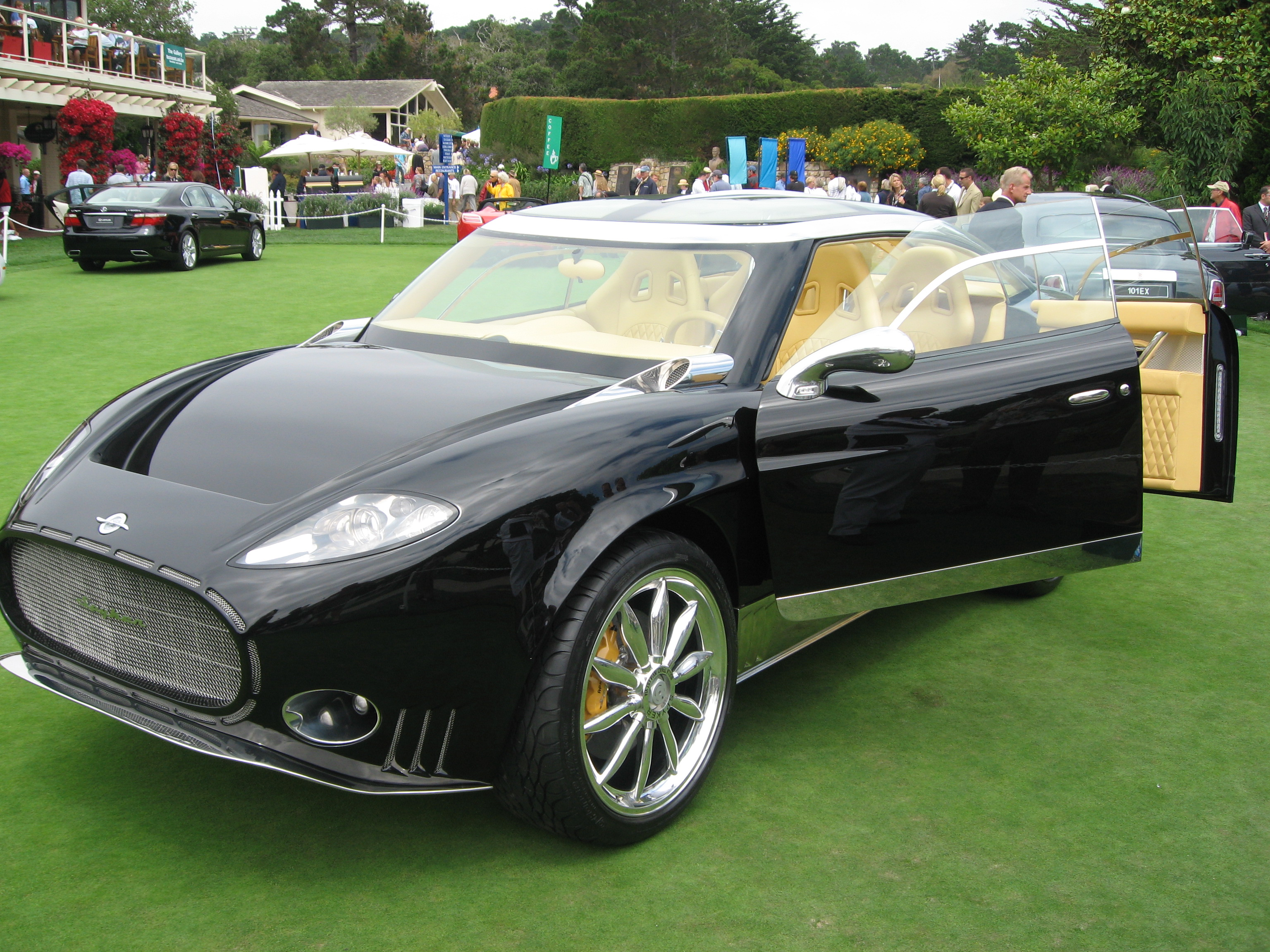
D12 at the 2006 Pebble Beach Concours d'Elegance

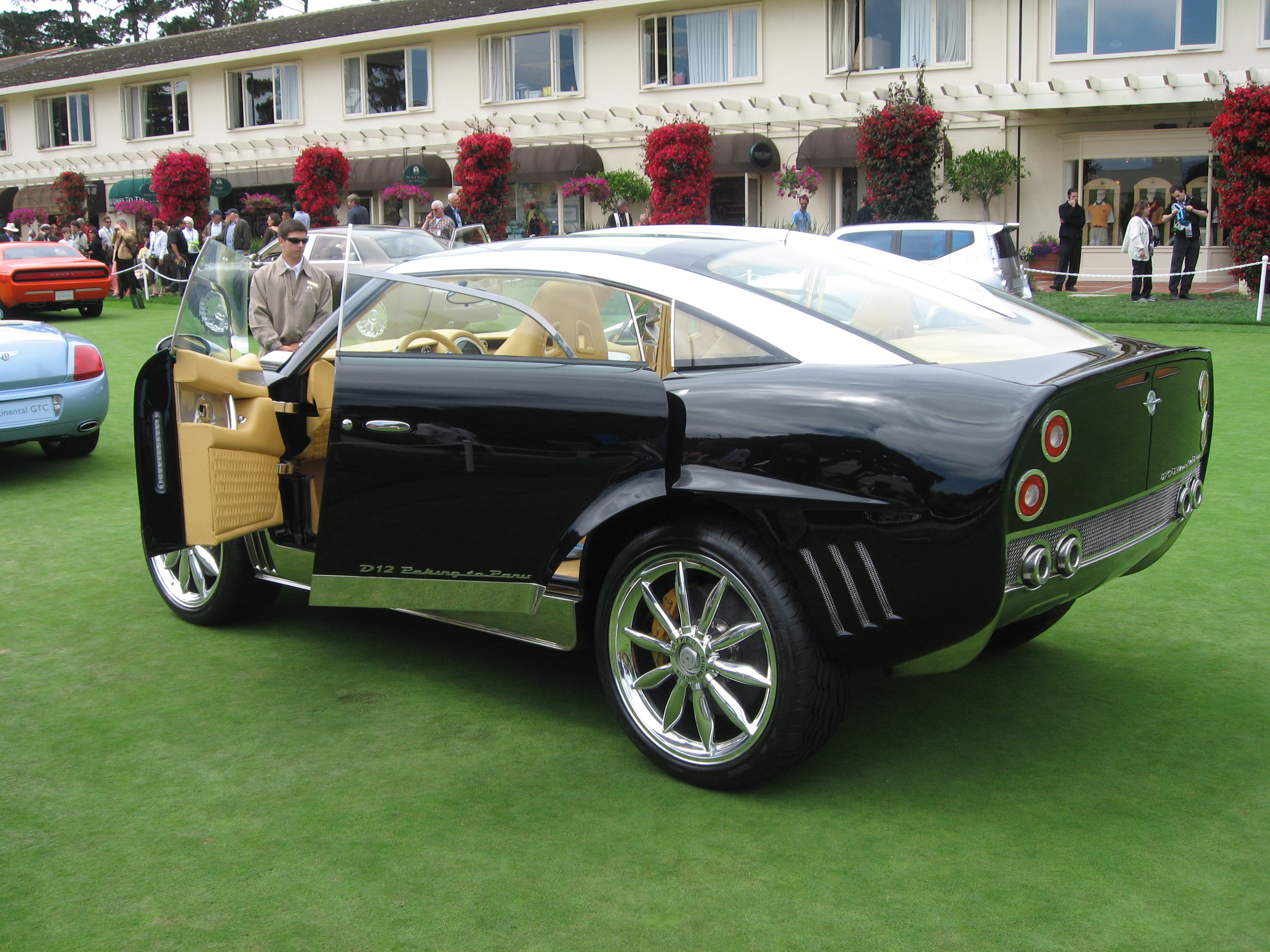
Rear view with doors open

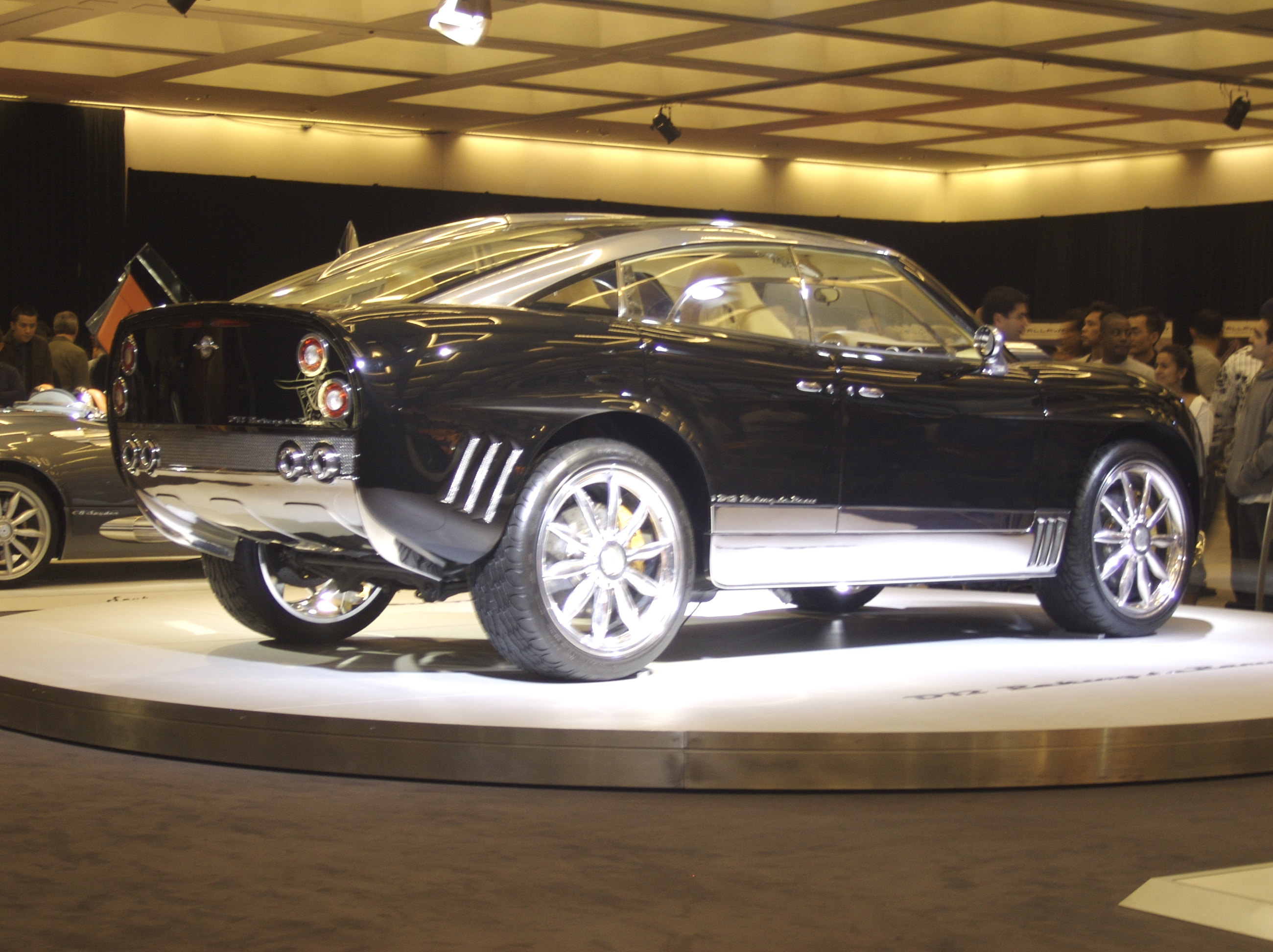
2006 D12 rear view

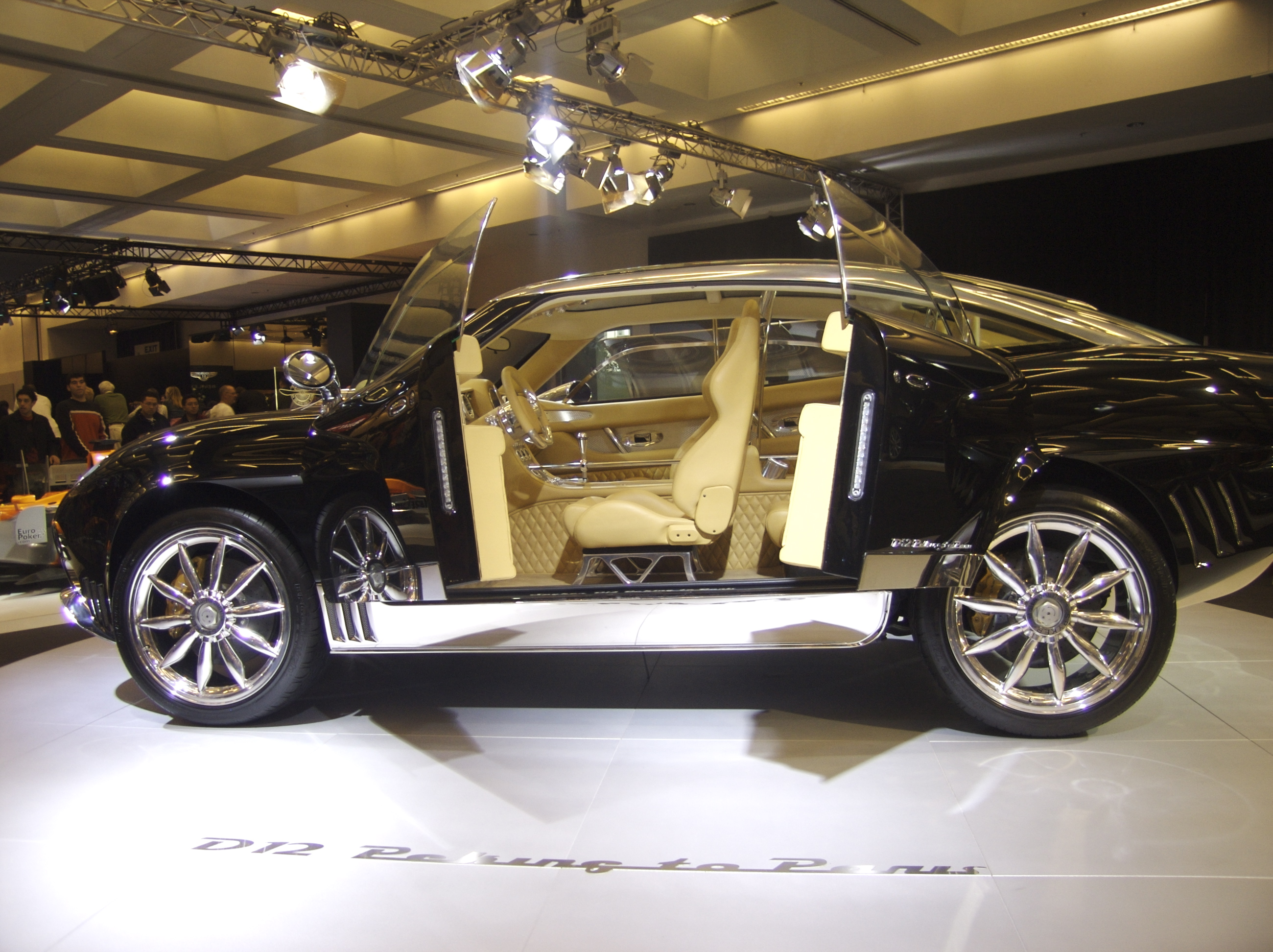
Side view with the doors open, showing the interior
