= Spyker Cars =

Dutch sports car marque

- Industry: Automotive
- Founded: 1999; 27 years ago
- Founders: Maarten de Bruijn; Victor Muller
- Headquarters: Zeewolde, Netherlands
- Key people: Peter van Erp,COO (2011)
- Products: Sports cars
- Revenue: €0.7 million (2012)
- Operating income: ▼€6.1 million (2012)
- Net income: ▲€114.4 million (2012)
- Total equity: €0.1 million (2012)
- Number of employees: 37 (FTE, average 2012)
- Parent: Spyker N.V. (1999–2021)
- Website: spykercars.com

Spyker Cars (/ˈspaɪkər/, Dutch pronunciation: [ˈspɛikər]) is a Dutch sports car brand founded in 1999. It was held by the holding company Spyker N.V. (formerly known as Spyker Cars N.V. and Swedish Automobile N.V.), which went bankrupt in January 2021. The modern Spyker Cars company held the legal rights to the brand name. The company's motto is "Nulla tenaci invia est via", Latin for "For the tenacious, no road is impassable". The marque's logo displays an aircraft propeller superimposed over a spoked wheel, a reference to the historic Spyker company that manufactured automobiles and aircraft. In 2010, the company acquired Swedish car manufacturer Saab Automobile from General Motors.

In June 2011 the company changed its name to Swedish Automobile N.V. In an attempt to save Spyker from bankruptcy, Swedish Automobile announced in September 2011 the immediate sale of Spyker to North Street Capital for €32 million (US$41 million). It was later revealed that the transaction did not take place.

On 18 December 2014, Spyker confirmed that it had gone bankrupt, hoping to restructure its finances and get back on its feet. The bankruptcy declaration was reverted in early 2015, and the company announced it would continue with the production of sports cars. Spyker went bankrupt again in January 2021. In January 2022 it announced a return to building cars, backed by Russian investors. The company showed a revised version of the C8 called the Preliator XXV in August 2026.

== History ==
=== Early years ===
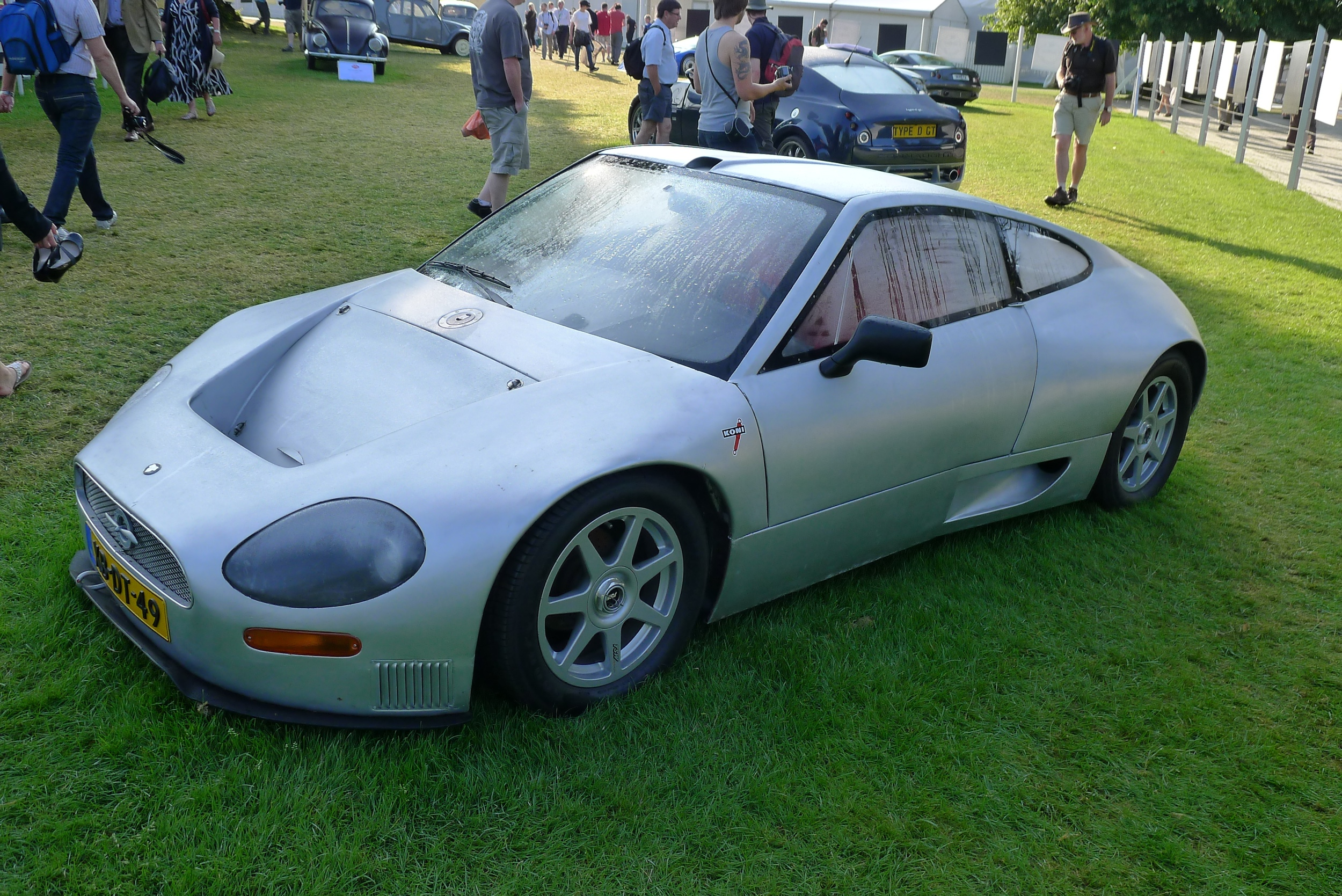
The earlier Spyker Silvestris V8

In 1999, the reborn company was founded by Victor Muller and Maarten de Bruijn, and since 2000, Spyker has been building sports cars such as the C8 Spyder and the C8 Laviolette. Spyker's history of producing aero engines is incorporated in the details in these new cars as well as in the logo. The first car built by de Bruijn was the Spyker Silvestris prototype, which inspired the C8 model.

The C8 Laviolette and C8 Spyder have a 4172 cc Audi V8 engine delivering 400 bhp (298 kW; 406 PS), acceleration from 0 to 97 km/h (0 to 60 mph) in 4.5 seconds, and a top speed of 300 km/h (190 mph). On 14 July 2005, Spyker announced that the C8 had been approved for sale in the US market.

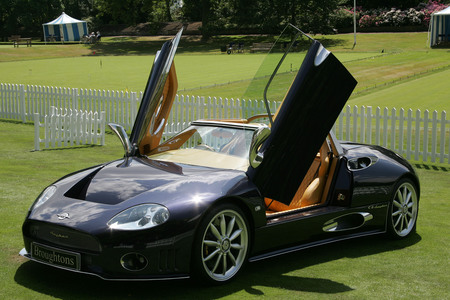
A Spyker C8 at Salon Prive, London, England.

Between 2002 and 2006, Spyker built the C8 Double 12 S, which was available from the factory with 5 different levels of performance called Stage I (400 h.p.) through Stage V (620 h.p.), depending on the customer's need for performance.

Between 2003 and 2007, Spyker built the C8 Spyder T, with the twin-turbo system developed in conjunction with Cosworth in England. These engines were capable of 525 h.p. and 0–60 mph acceleration times of 4.0 seconds.

In 2005, the head designer and founder, Maarten de Bruijn, left the company and Simon Koop took over as main designer while Maarten de bruijn founded Silvestris Aquamotive, which builds aluminum space frame speed boats.

In 2006, Spyker built the C12 La Turbie with a W12 engine capable of 500 horsepower and acceleration from 0–60 mph in less than 4 seconds.

In September 2006, Spyker acquired the Midland F1 team, which subsequently competed in the final three races of the 2006 season as Spyker MF1. During the 2007 Formula One season, the team competed as Spyker F1 using engines supplied by Ferrari. Driver Adrian Sutil was paired with Christijan Albers until the European Grand Prix, after which the latter was replaced by reserve driver Markus Winkelhock; the team then signed Sakon Yamamoto to fill in the slot for the rest of the year. The team itself had minimal success, suffering from multiple retirements (including double retirements in Malaysia, Canada, and Brazil) before Sutil scored the team's first and only point in Japan. At the end of the season, the team was sold to a consortium named "Orange India" led by Vijay Mallya, and was subsequently renamed Force India.

On 27 May 2004, Spyker Cars listed on the Euronext Amsterdam Stock Exchange at €15.50, falling to a low of €8.28 in April 2005. The stock rebounded sharply in early 2006 to over €22 per share. Early in 2007 the stock showed a sharp decline to levels beneath €13 because of financing issues. As a result, several stock issues were announced to big investors. Notably, all shares have been sold at higher prices than the market price at the moment of announcement. On 13 November 2005, Spyker Cars and Mubadala Development Company, a principal investment company wholly owned by the government of the United Arab Emirates, announced their strategic alliance, with Mubadala acquiring 17% of Spyker. Mubadala has a strong relationship with sports cars, also controlling 5% of Ferrari.

In 2007, Spyker, in collaboration with the Italian car-design firm Zagato, produced the C12 Zagato, based on the C12 La Turbie, but with a restyled body, increased performance, and the Zagato trademark double bubble roof. This is perhaps the most exclusive Spyker car to date.

In November 2009, Spyker announced that it would be moving production from Zeewolde to Whitley, Coventry, where assembly would be done in partnership with CPP Manufacturing. UK production began in February 2010. Due to the bankruptcy of SAAB and a falling out with its business partners, the production was not moved to the UK.

=== Acquisition of Saab Automobile ===
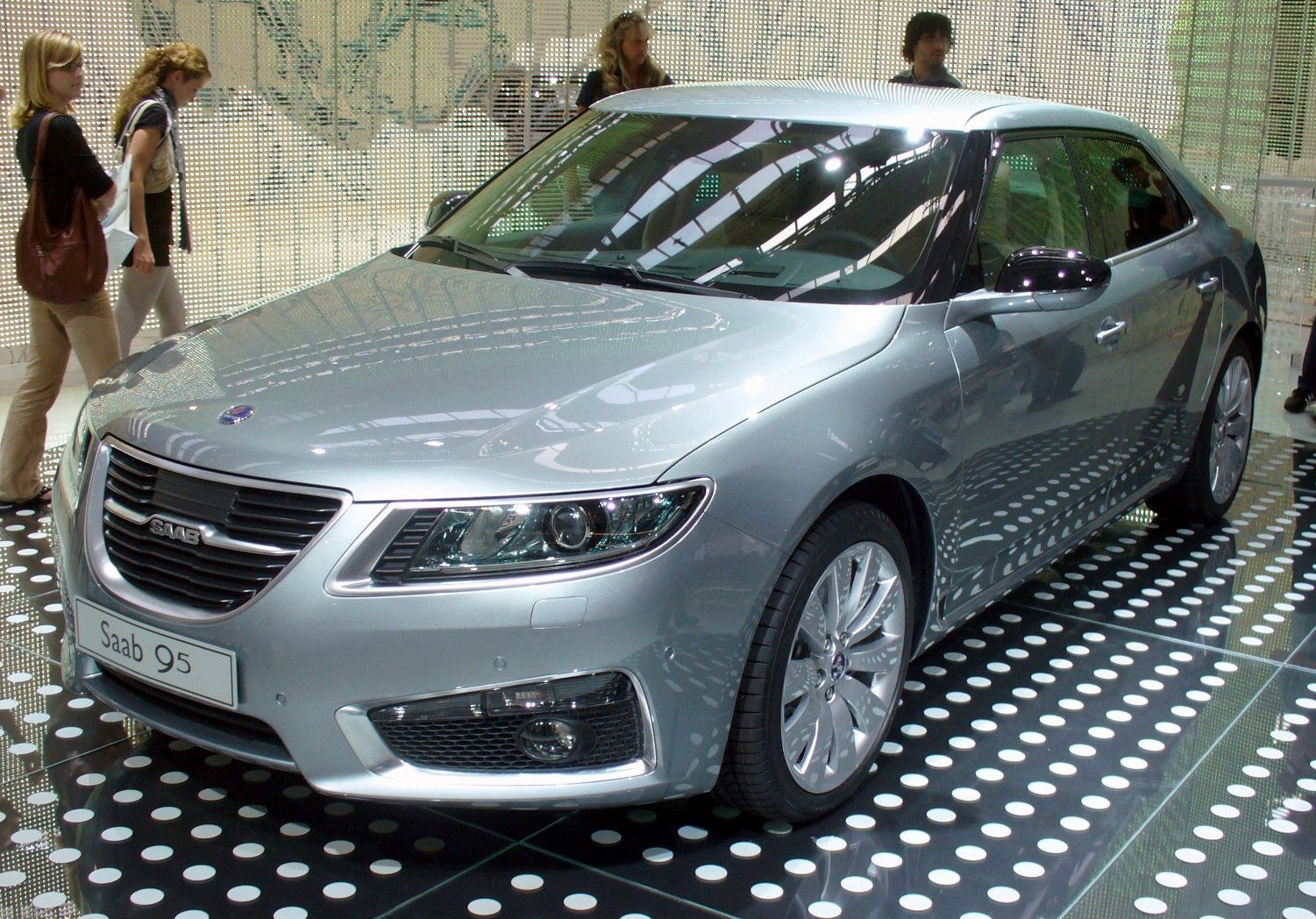
2011 Saab 9-5, the first Saab vehicle released under Spyker ownership

In late November 2009, following the collapse of Koenigsegg Group's acquisition of Saab Automobile from General Motors (GM), Spyker placed a bid of its own to acquire Saab. General Motors (GM), receptive to the offer, entered into negotiations with Spyker and conducted an extensive due diligence effort. From this, they learned that the Swedish monetary and security agencies had uncovered ties between the family of Vladimir Antonov—a major Spyker shareholder—and organized crime syndicates engaged in money laundering. In part due to this, GM ended negotiations with Spyker on the 18th of December, stating that it would begin a staged wind-down of operations at Saab Automobile in January if a buyer for it couldn't be found.

Spyker CEO Victor Muller revived the deal by revising the company's acquisition bid and acquiring Antonov's shares via Tenaci, another company he owned. On 26 January 2010, Spyker reached an agreement with GM to purchase Saab for US$394 million, comprising US$74 million in cash and US$320 million in Spyker stock, subject to regulatory and government approval. General Motors would continue to supply Saab with engines and transmissions and would produce the new Saab 9-4X at GM's Mexican factory. To pay the upfront acquisition cost, Spyker took out a loan from the European Investment Bank and borrowed $US25 million from Convers Bank, owned by former investor Vladimir Antonov.

On 23 February 2010, Spyker completed its acquisition of Saab Automobile and announced it would restructure to make both Spyker and Saab subsidiaries of a parent company called Swedish Automobile. The restructure was completed on 15 June 2011, when shareholders agreed at the company's annual shareholder meeting to change its official name from Spyker Cars N.V. to Swedish Automobile N.V.

=== Saab bankruptcy ===
By the end of 2010, however, Saab Automobile ran out of money, and Spyker was unable to fund the losses. The companies stopped paying their bills in early 2011, resulting in the halting of production on 30 March due to suppliers refusing to deliver parts on credit.

In February 2011, it was announced that Swedish Automobile, the Dutch owner of Saab Automobile, agreed to sell its sports car unit to Vladimir Antonov. Antonov, a former Spyker chairman and shareholder, was expected to pay €15 million (US$21 million) for the company. However, in March 2011, the deal fell through, with Spyker's manufacturing partner CPP Manufacturing placing a bid, but this deal fell through later that month.

On 8 June 2011, Saab Automobile said it had stopped production due to an insufficient supply of parts. This occurred only two weeks after resuming production following a seven-week hiatus. The supply of parts stopped because Saab did not pay its suppliers. Production was due to start again on 9 August.

On the 23rd of June, Saab announced that it was unable to pay June salaries to the entire workforce of 3,800 due to lack of funding. The trade union IF Metall gave Saab seven days to pay the salaries to their employees; otherwise, IF Metall threatened to force a liquidation of the company. On 29 June, Saab employees were paid.

Swedish Automobile initially tried to secure funding in May 2011 via proposed joint ventures with Chinese automotive manufacturers Hawtai and Youngman and the Chinese car dealership chain Pang Da. As negotiations had not progressed by September, Swedish Automobile offered to sell its Spyker Cars division to the American private equity firm North Street Capital for €32 million (US$41 million), but was declined. Saab Automotive submitted a debt restructuring plan that would put the company on track to have positive equity by 2014 via a process that would involve terminating 500 employees to save €110,000,000. The proposal was accepted by a Swedish court on 31 October 2011.

On 28 October 2011, Swedish Automobile announced that it would sell Saab Automobile for €100 million (US$140 million) to Youngman and Pang Da, who would acquire 60 and 40 percent of Saab's shares, respectively. GM rejected the deal with Youngman and Pang Da on 7 November to prevent them from benefiting from technology Saab had licensed from it. On 19 December, following a month of unsuccessful negotiations with GM, Saab Automobile filed for bankruptcy due to being unable to find another company to acquire it. Swedish Automotive attempted to prevent the liquidation of Saab by putting Spyker Cars up for sale again but was unable to find a buyer.

On 16 April 2012, a meeting regarding Saab's bankruptcy was held at the District Court of Vänersborg. The official receivers in charge of the Saab liquidation valued its assets and debt at US$500 million and US$2 billion, respectively, leaving it with a debt of US$1.5 billion. In June 2012, the company was sold to the Chinese-Swedish investment group National Electric Vehicle Sweden (NEVS), after which Swedish Automotive N.V. was renamed Spyker N.V.

=== Post-bankruptcy ===
On 6 August 2012, Spyker announced that it would sue GM over the Saab bankruptcy, with CEO Muller stating, "Ever since we were forced to file for Saab Automobile's bankruptcy in December of last year, we have worked relentlessly on the preparation for this lawsuit, which seeks to compensate Spyker and Saab for the massive damages we have incurred as a result of GM's unlawful actions." In June 2013, the US$3 billion claim was heard in Detroit, Michigan, before US Federal Judge Gershwin Drain. Drain dismissed it on the basis that "General Motors had a contractual right to approve or disapprove the proposed transaction" due to Spyker having given GM the right to veto any change of ownership in the Saab acquisition agreement. Spyker's appeal of the ruling was heard at the 6th U.S. Circuit Court of Appeals in Cincinnati on 24 October 2014. Judge Eugene Siler ruled in favor of GM, stating that the company's blocking of the sale of Saab had not been malicious but rather based upon "legitimate business concerns" about who would benefit from Saab's use of GM technology.

On 27 August 2012, Spyker announced that Youngman had acquired a 29.9% stake in the company for €10 million (US$12.5 million). Two joint ventures between Spyker and Youngman were announced, Spyker P2P and Spyker Phoenix, with Spyker having 25% and 20% stakes in them, respectively. Spyker P2P would develop new luxury sports utility vehicles, while Spyker Phoenix would develop a range of premium cars based on the Saab PhoeniX platform.

In March 2013, the B6 Venator was unveiled at the Geneva Motor Show as Spyker's first concept car in nearly four years. On 16 September 2013, Spyker N.V. lost its listing on Euronext Amsterdam after failing to undergo a restructuring agreement. On 5 November 2014, the Central Netherlands District Court ordered Spyker to leave the factory it had been renting within seven days and pay its owner €152,000 in overdue rent. The claim was made by Jacques Walch, the owner of the factory rented by Spyker. Despite this, CEO Victor Muller insisted the company would be able to pay its bills "in a matter of days".

On 2 December 2014, Spyker NV was granted a moratorium on payments (financial restructuring) by the Central Netherlands District Court. the company needed protection from creditors due to liquidity problems. Victor R. Muller, Spyker's founder and chief executive, said, "Over the past few years, Spyker has faced a number of serious difficulties and challenges resulting from, among others, the legacy of the F1 era and the acquisition of Saab Automobile AB".

That same day, Spyker filed a voluntary petition for financial restructuring ("surseance van betaling") to address short-term operational and liquidity challenges, the Dutch equivalent of Chapter 11 bankruptcy. The Central Netherlands District Court initially declared the company bankrupt on 18 December but reversed course on 29 January 2015, after Spyker appealed the decision. The court granted Spyker's petition and appointed an administrator to work with the Board of Management in overseeing the company's affairs until the restructering was complete. The ruling granted Spyker a moratorium on payments protecting its assets from seizure by creditors during the restructuring period.

On 13 May, Spyker reached a settlement with its creditors – to whom it owed a combined €44 million – agreeing to pay each €12,000. Saab GB, the largest creditor with €24.9 million at stake, agreed to receive a payment of €61,000. A later attempt by the Latvian bank Lizings to claim additional funds was rejected by the court.

On 29 July 2015, Spyker completed its restructuring plan and resumed regular business operations. In March 2016, the company announced the production of a new model, the C8 Preliator, at the Geneva Motor Show.

In January 2021, Spyker filed for bankruptcy again. Mr. D. Steffens was appointed trustee in bankruptcy.

In 2023, trustee Steffens announced that he might file charges against Muller for bankruptcy fraud. By that time, Spyker no longer had a production site, personnel, parts, and tools; these had been laid off, sold, or had disappeared at an earlier stage. Only the trademark rights and intellectual property remained.

In the August 2025 bankruptcy report, trustee Dennis Steffens announced the sale of Spyker's trademark rights. This made any restart by Muller impossible and marked an important step in the final liquidation of the company.

In October 2025, Spyker founder Victor Muller and the trustee in the insolvency of two Spyker subsidiaries had reached a final and full settlement which allowed the automaker to be fully in control of the company he started.

== Models ==
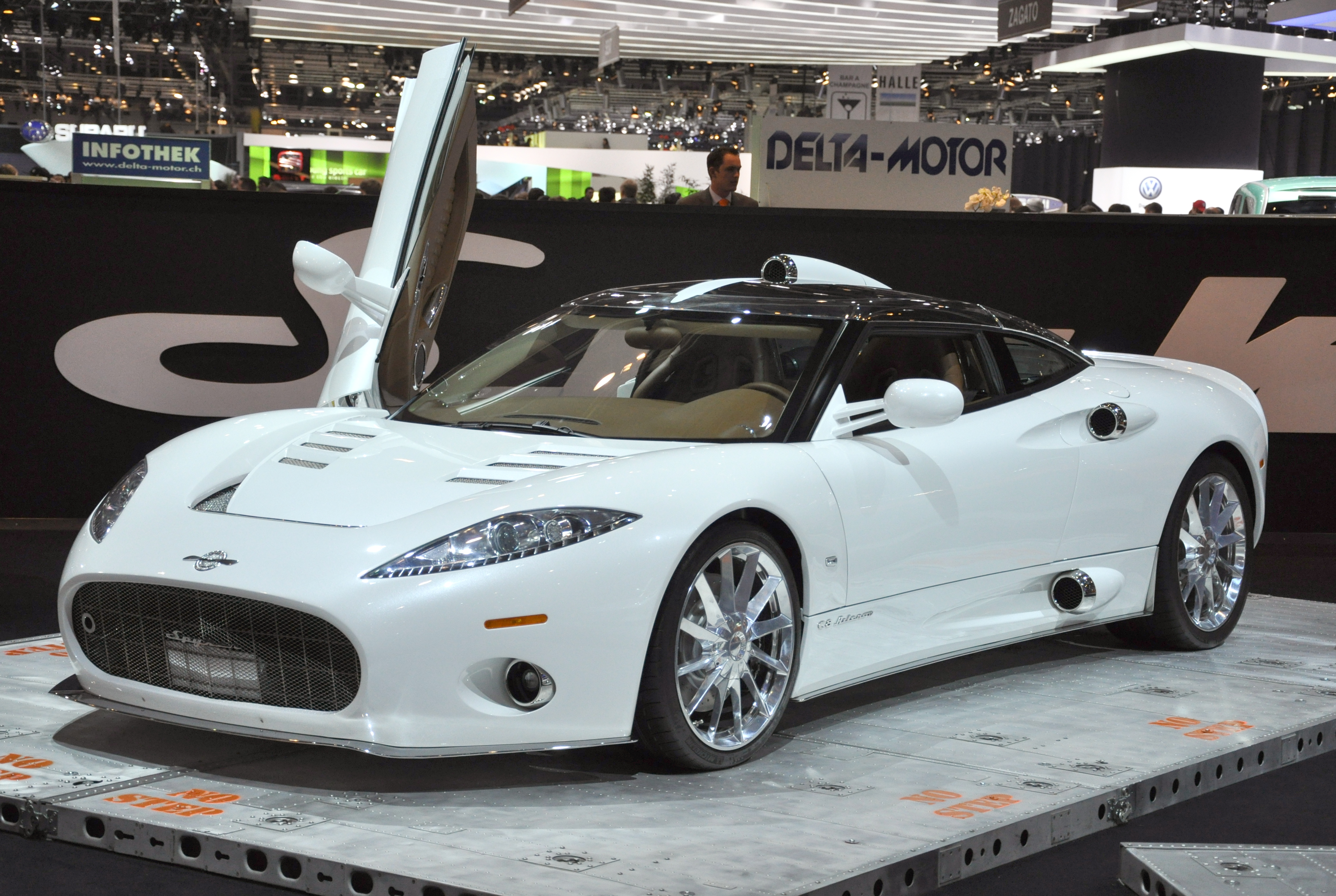
Spyker C8 Aileron

=== Produced ===
==== Spyker C8 ====
The C8 Spyder was the original base model, equipped with an Audi 4.2 litre V8 engine. Since production began in 2000, twelve different variants have been sold. A long-wheelbase version, the CA Aileron, was presented at the 2008 Geneva Motor Show, followed by a convertible version a year later. Horsepower ranges from 400 for the original C8 Spyder to 620 for the C8 Double 12S.

The most recent model, the C8 Preliator, was officially announced at the 2016 Geneva Motor Show. Only 50 vehicles would be produced. The car has a 4.2-litre supercharged Audi V8 producing 525 hp, resulting in a 0–100 km/h time of 3.7 seconds and a top speed of 322 km/h. It is offered with either a 6-speed Getrag manual transmission or a 6-speed ZF automatic transmission. As with previous Spyker models, the car has typical aviation-inspired design elements such as NACA styled air-inlets. Driver technology has been upgraded as well compared to previous models, with the C8 Preliator gaining a heads-up display and bluetooth connectivity for phones.

=== Canceled ===
==== Spyker C12 ====
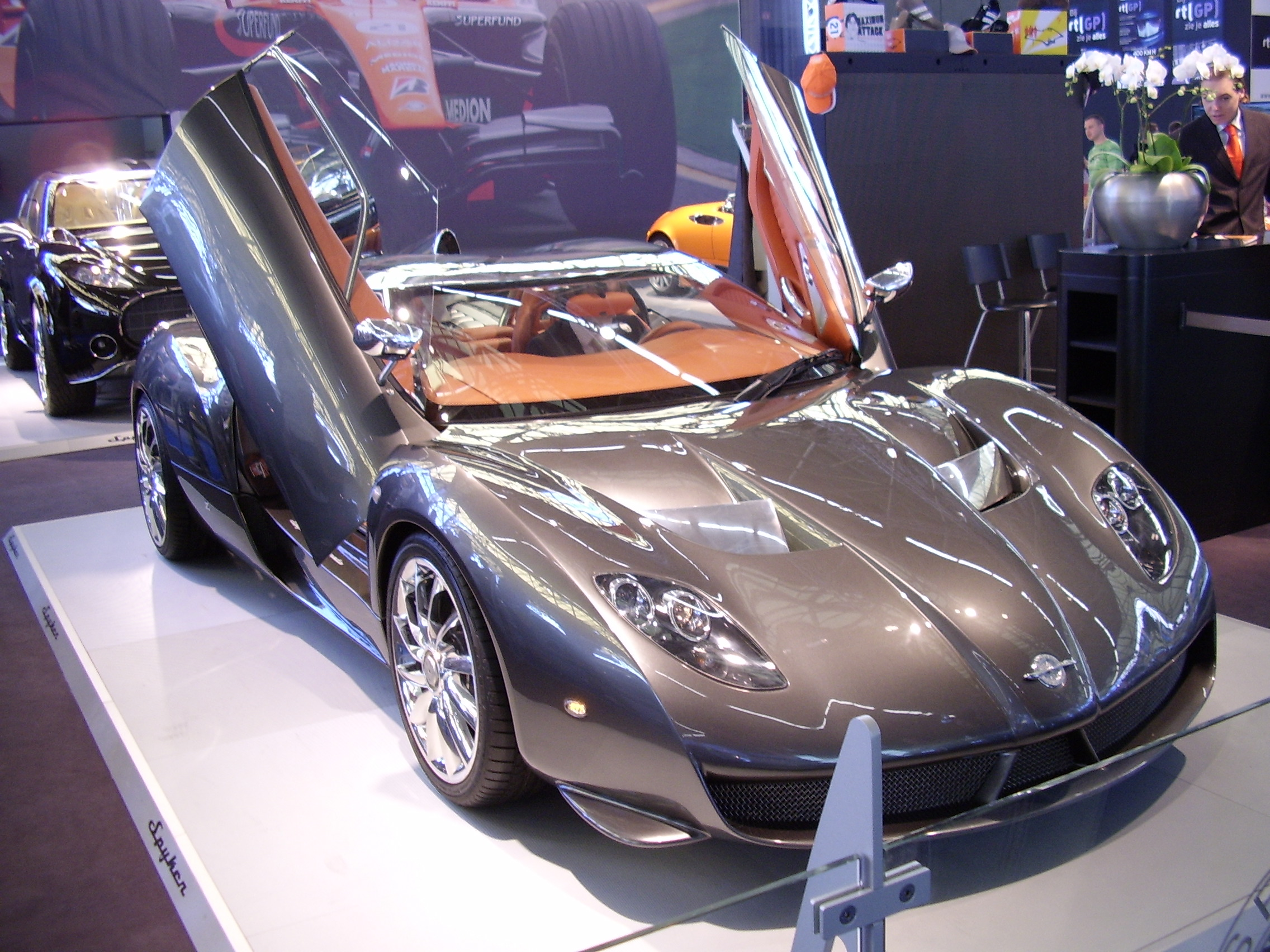
Spyker C12 Zagato.

The Spyker C12 is a luxury sports car produced in two variants. Spyker originally planned to produce 25 LaTurbies, however, in October 2007 it was announced that Spyker had canceled production of all C12 models, including the C12 LaTurbie and its sister model the C12 Zagato, before any cars were produced, in order to focus their resources on other models.

- Spyker C12 La Turbie, 2006
- Spyker C12 Zagato, 2007

==== Spyker D12/D8 ====
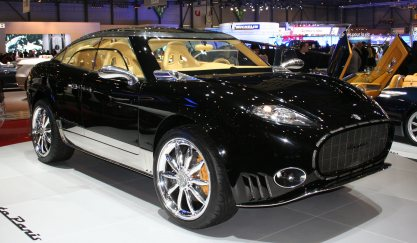
Spyker D12 Peking-to-Paris.

In 2006, the Spyker D12 Peking-to-Paris high-performance SUV, was announced at the Geneva Motor Show. Mass-production, originally slated for mid-2008, was delayed, and the concept car's V12 engine was replaced with a Volkswagen W12 engine producing around 500 bhp (373 kW; 507 PS). The model's name was subsequently changed to the D8.

Spyker hoped that the assistance from Saab, which it owned at the time, would help bring the D8 to production. According to Muller, in April 2011 the D8 was expected to enter production in early 2013 with a price tag of £186,000. However, by March 2013, production had been rescheduled for 2016, with a production prototype planned for 2014. Ultimately, plans to produce the model were discontinued.

==== Spyker E8/E12 ====
Spyker shareholders and CEO, Victor Muller, hinted at developing a Maserati Quattroporte and Porsche Panamera rival with either an eight-cylinder (the E8) or a twelve-cylinder (the E12) engine. However, due to difficulties bringing the D8 into production, the idea was set aside until 2009, when Muller stated that he "believes now could be the time to resurrect the saloon". Muller estimated that it would take about four years from the reveal of the E8/E12 to reach production. The model was never produced.

== Gallery ==
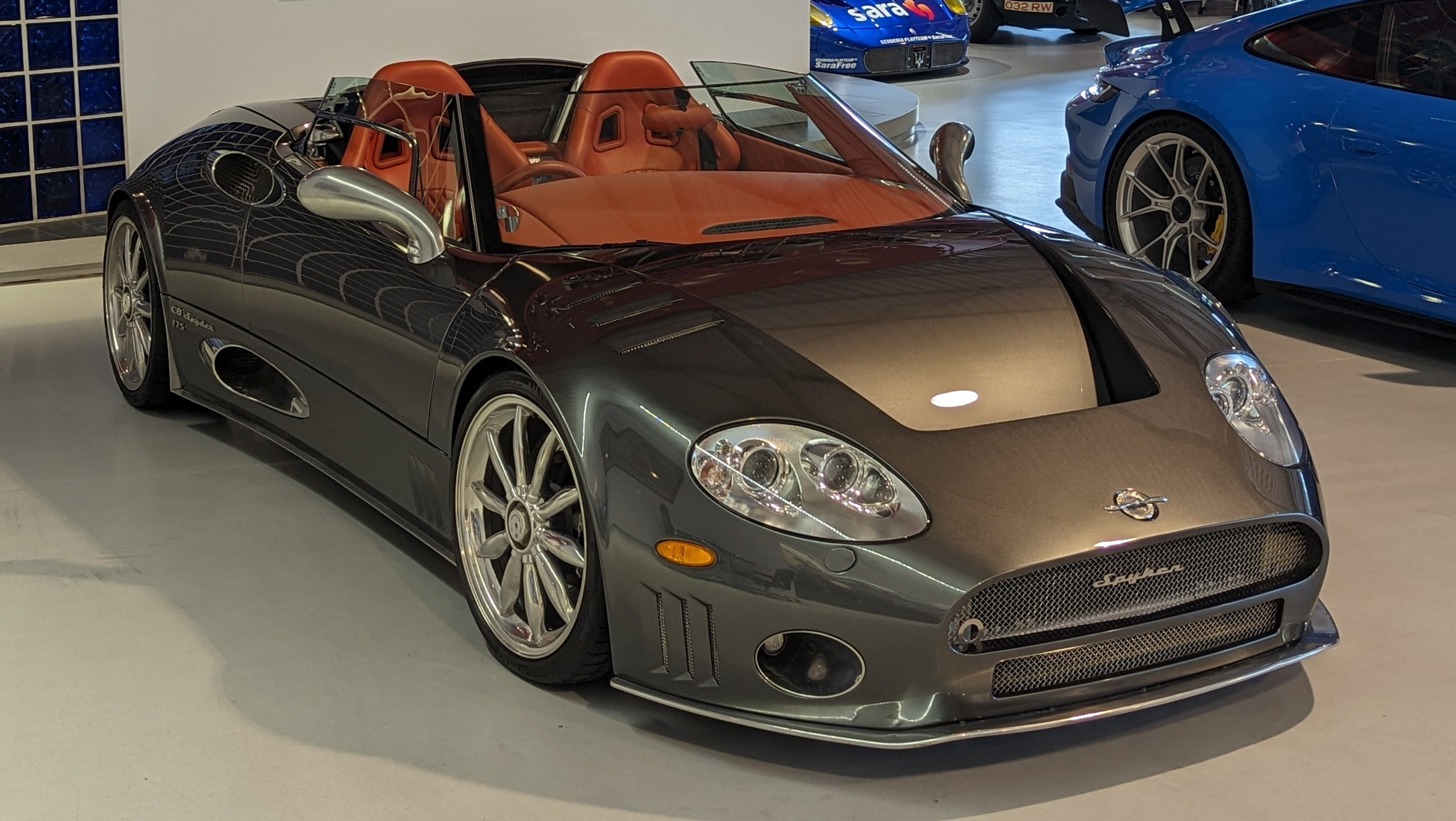
Spyker C8 Spider (2008)

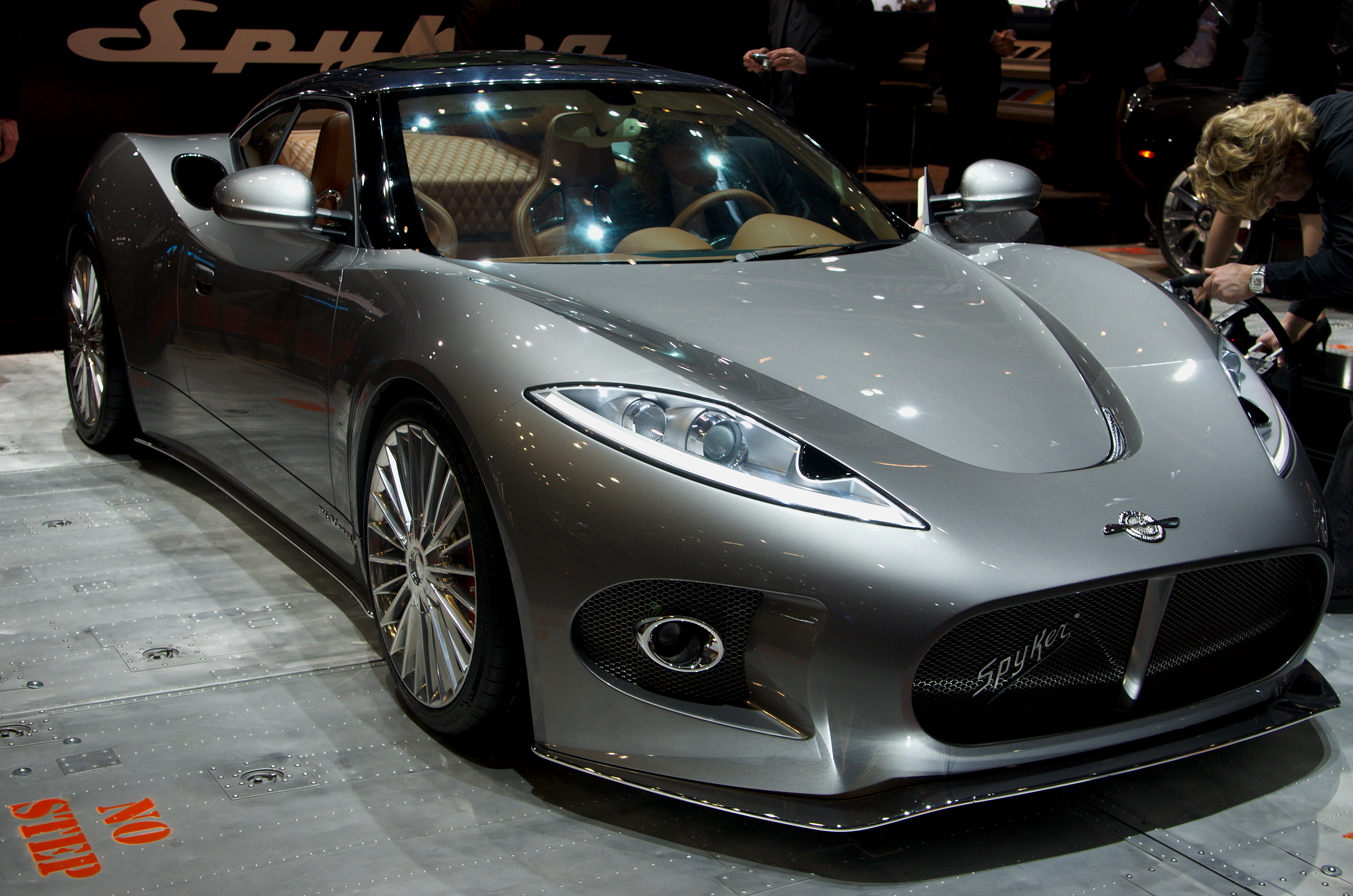
Spyker B6 Venator (2013)

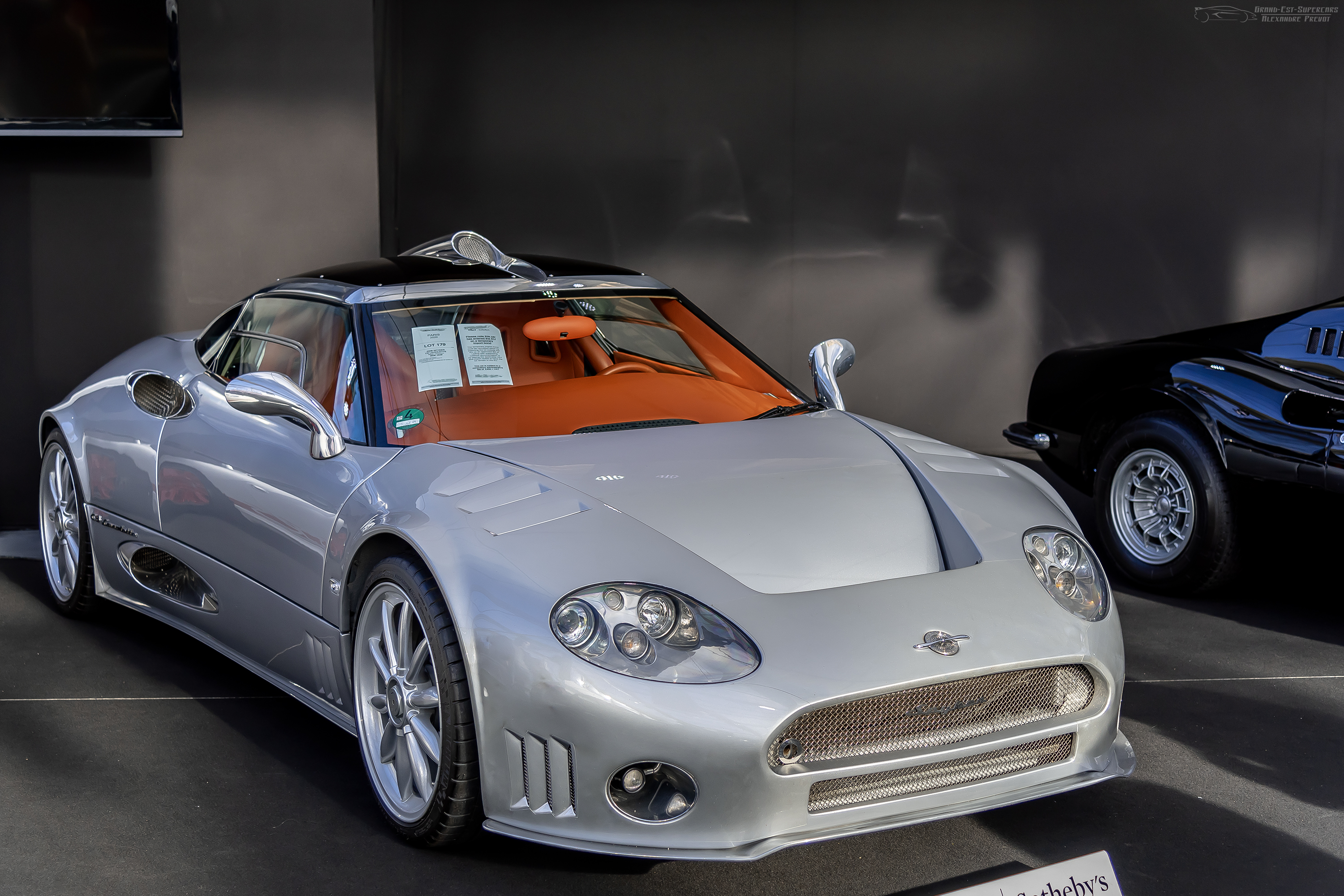
Spyker C8 Laviolette (2001)

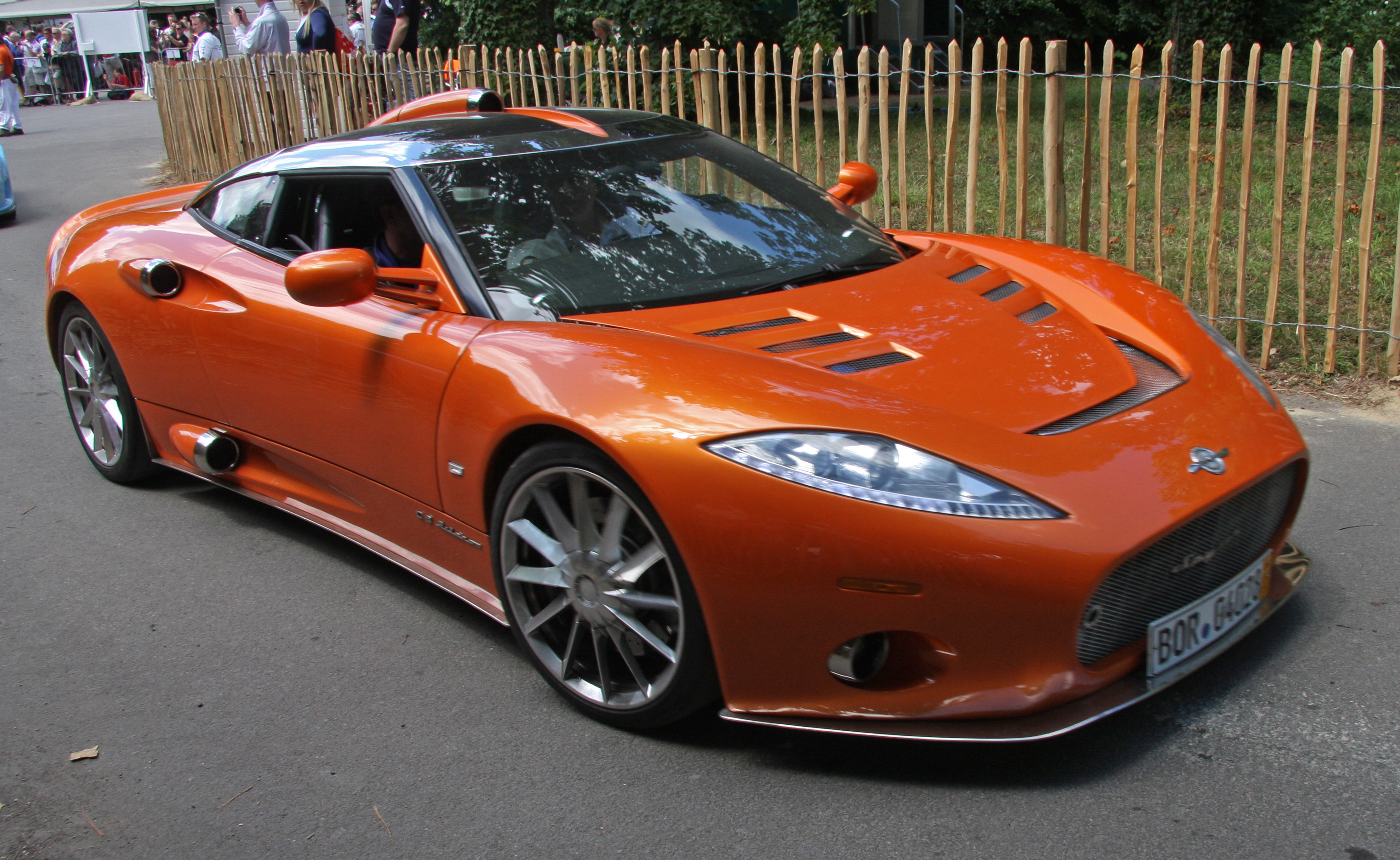
Spyker C8 Aileron (2008)

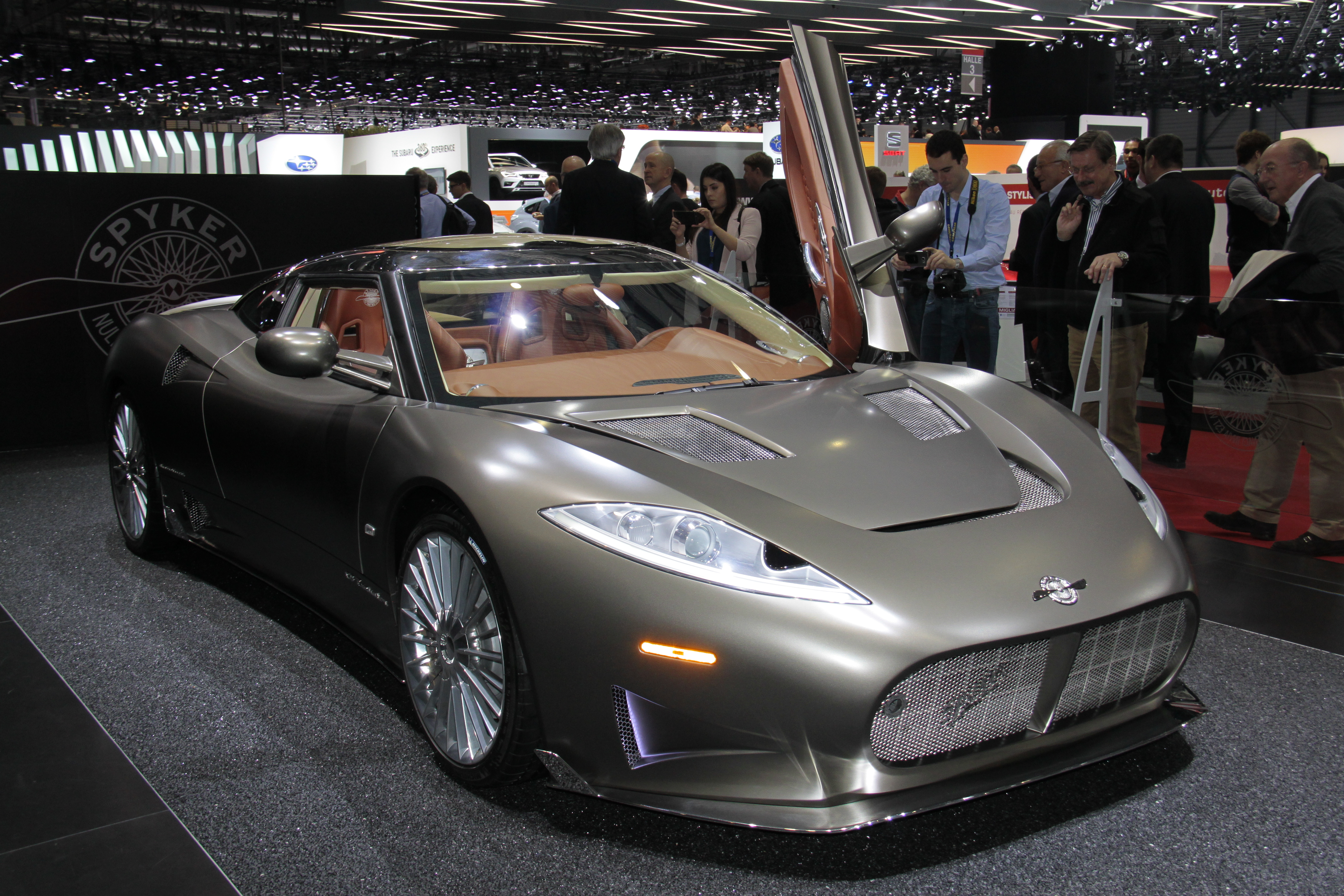
Spyker C8 Preliator (2016)

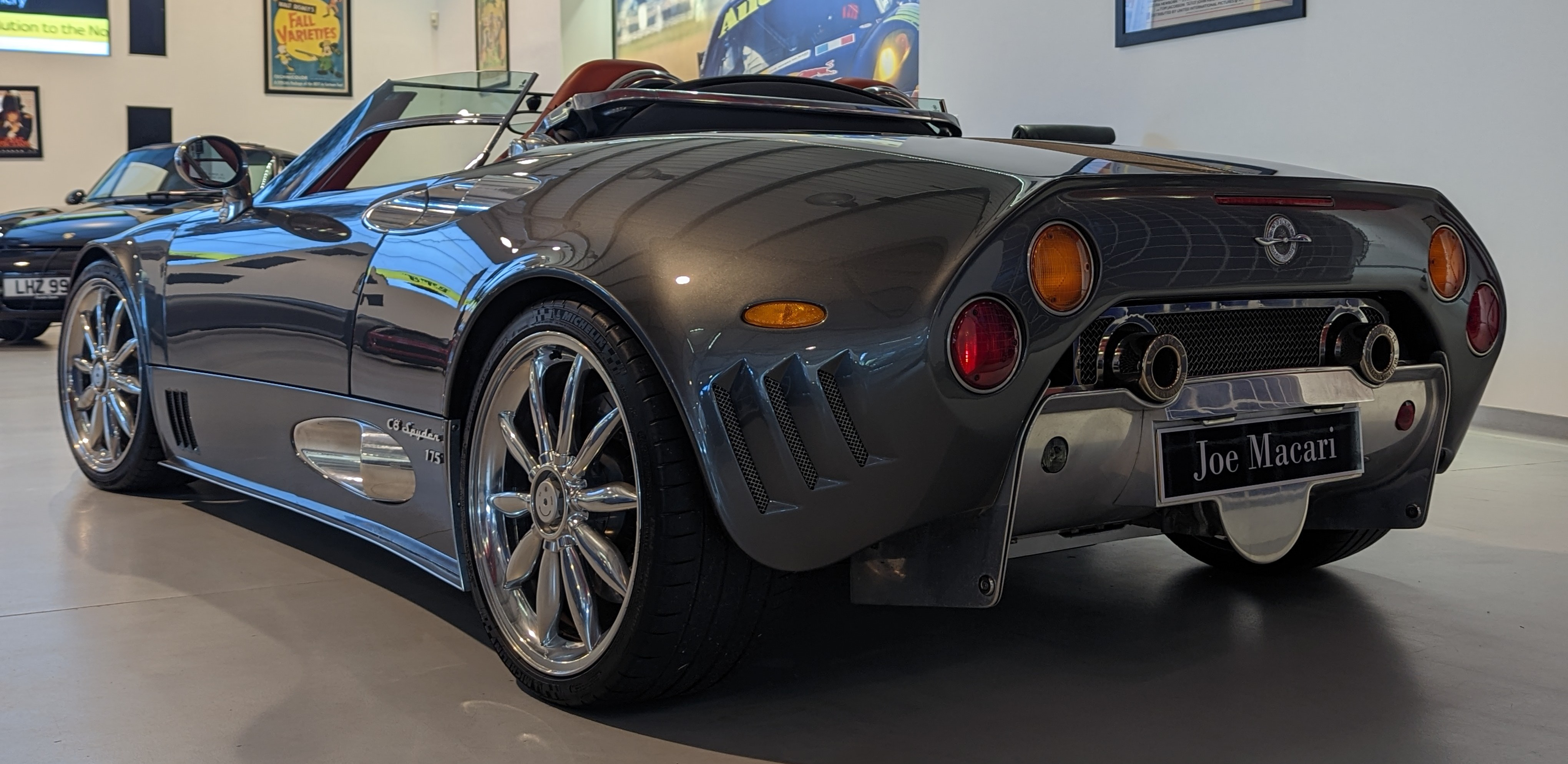
The Back of a Spyker C8 Spider

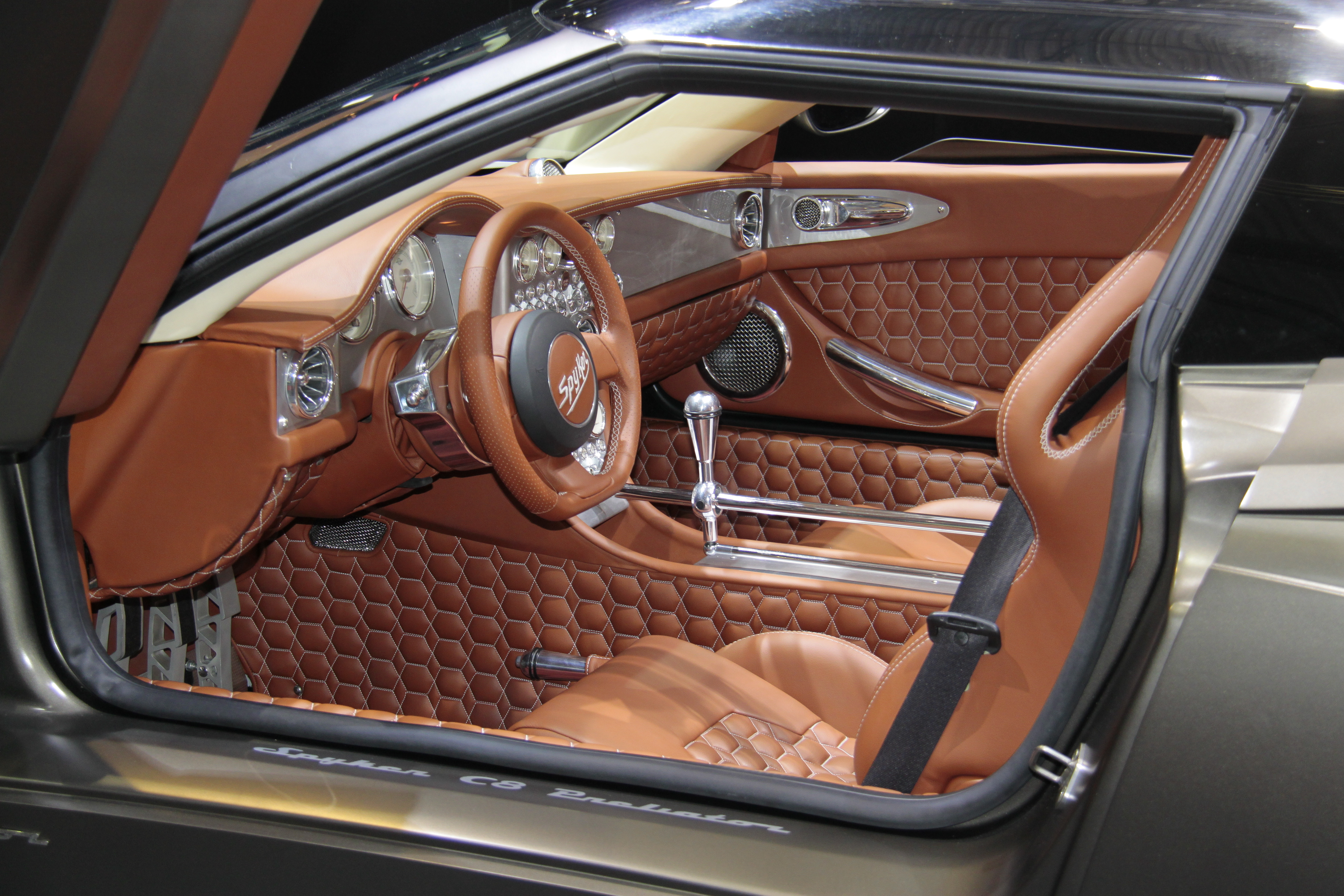
Interior of a Spyker

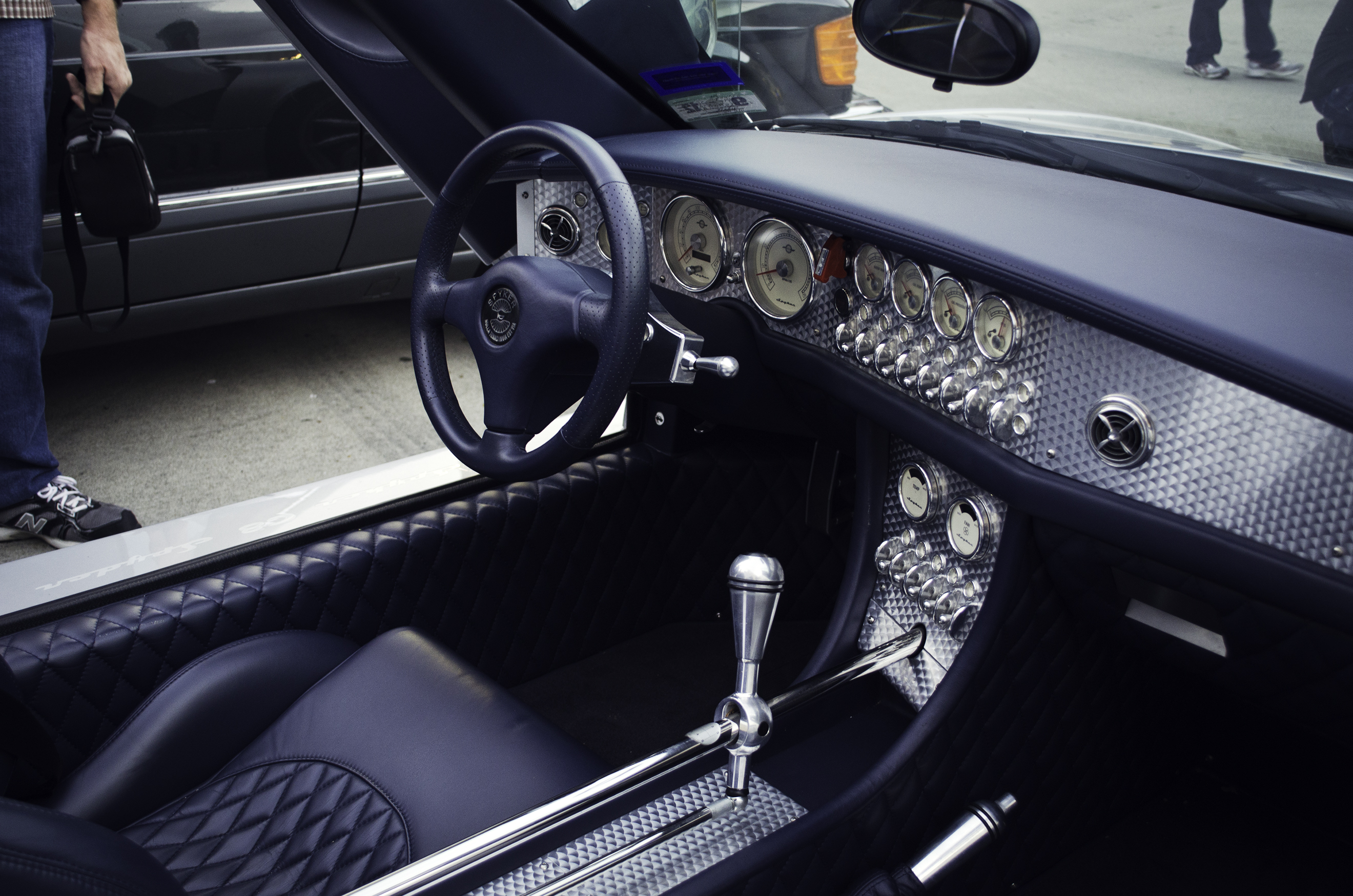
Interior of a Spyker C8 Spider

== Finances ==
=== Sales ===
Spyker's all-time sales peak was reached in 2006, with 94 cars sold. In total, approximately 290 cars were sold between 2000 and 2010.

Calendar Year	Total Sales
2000	1
2001	2
2002	3
2003	12
2004	31
2005	48
2006	94
2007	26
2008	43
2009	36
2010	"Pending"
2011	12
2012	2
2013	0
2014	0
2026	19

=== Financial results ===
Spyker recorded losses each year beginning in 2007. The table below summarizes key financial figures for Spyker Cars from 2007 to 2012. The data originates from the Spyker Annual Report in 2011 and 2012.

in millions
Year	Turnover	Company- result	Net result	Capital	Stock per year end	Number employees in FTE (x 1)
2007	€5,1	€ -29,7	€ -71,3	€25,6	9,7	166
2008	€7,9	€ -21,8	€ -24,8	€24,9	15,6	132
2009	€6,8	€ -19,2	€ -22,9	€2,6	15,9	131
2010	€3,3	€ -64,1	€ -218,3	€ -206,5	17,5	55
2011	€1,5	€ -13,8	€16,1	€ -151,2	36,0	56
2012	€0,7	€ -6,1	€114,4	€0,1	373,9	37
2014	€0,0	€0,0	€ -44,0	€0,0	0,0	0
2015	€0,0	€0,0	€0,0	€0,0	0,0	0

== Motorsport ==
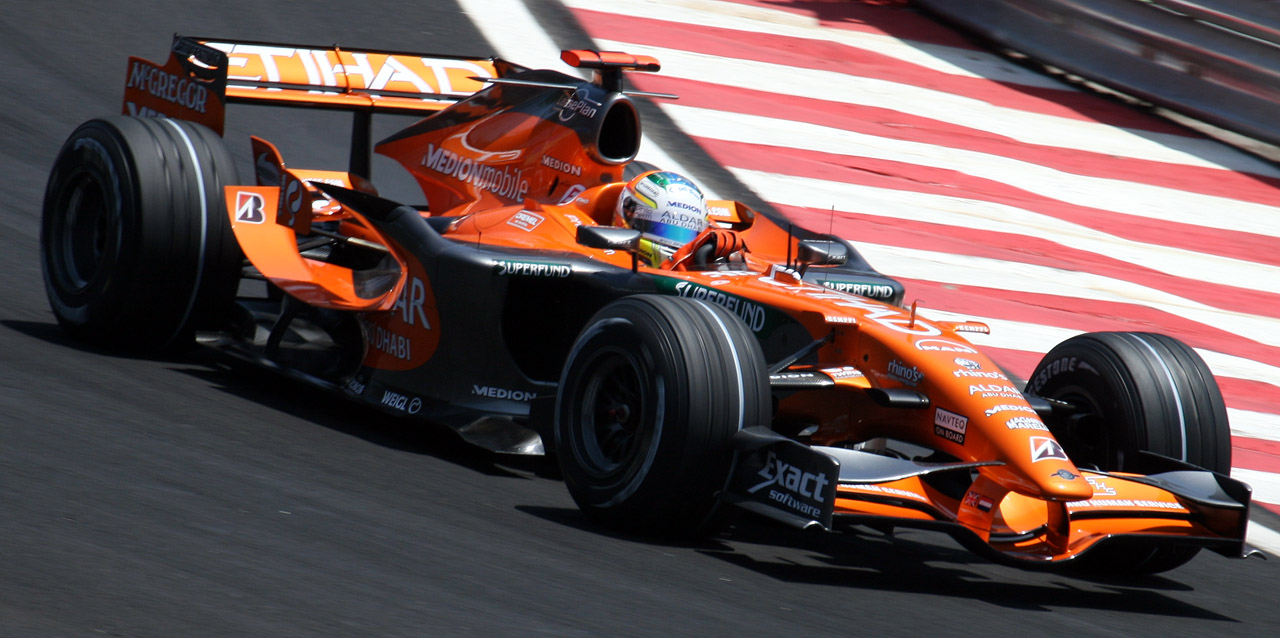
Adrian Sutil driving for Spyker F1 at the 2007 Brazilian Grand Prix

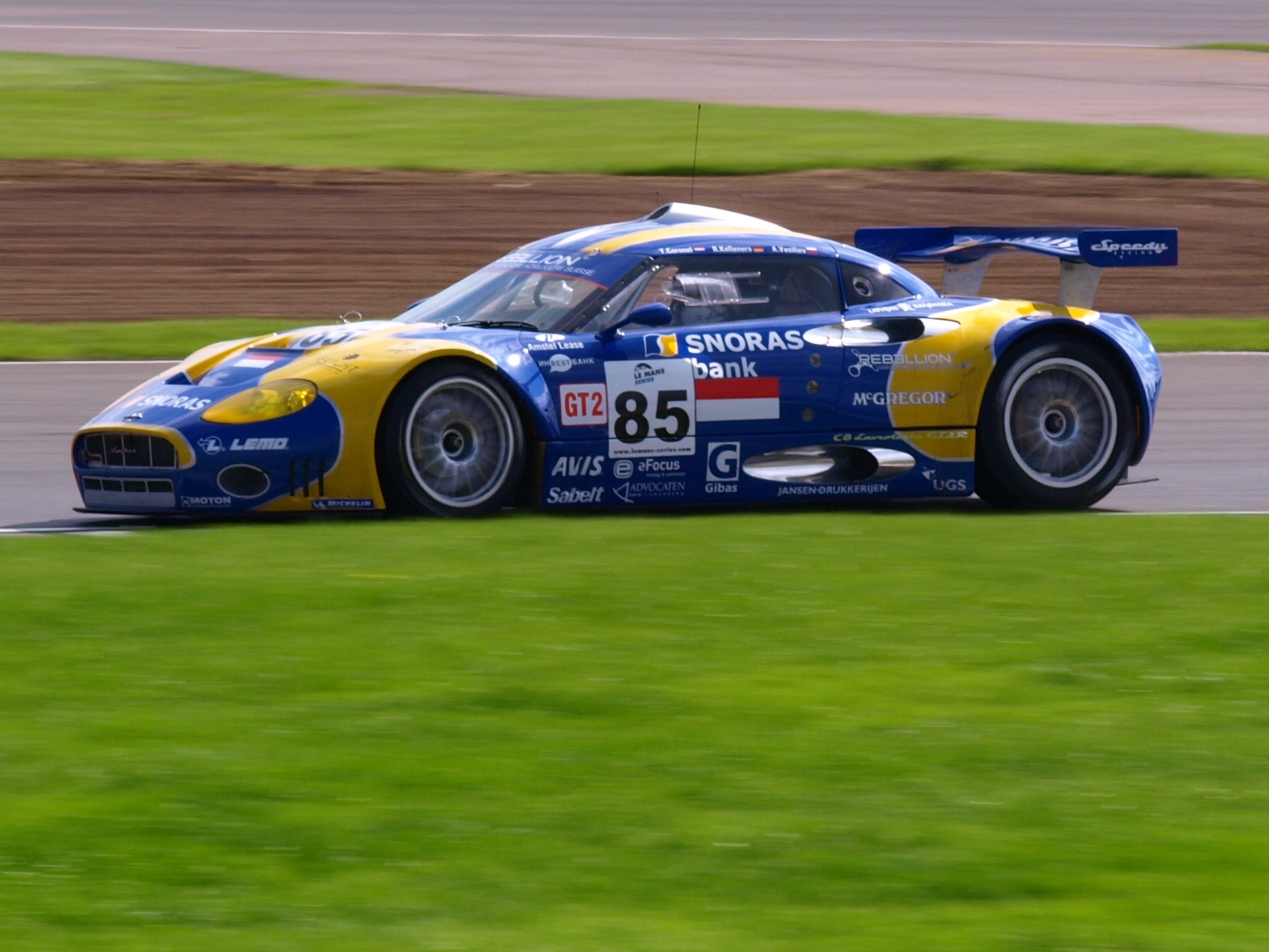
Spyker Squadron's Spyker C8 Laviolette GT2-R at the 2008 1000 km of Silverstone

=== Spyker F1 ===
On 9 September 2006, Spyker purchased Midland F1 Racing co-owned by Alexander Radunsky, a Formula One team owned by Canadian businessman Alex Shnaider. Spyker paid US$106.6 million for the team, which was renamed the Spyker MF1 Team for the last three races of the 2006 Formula One season. As part of the agreement, the cars had a revised livery for those final three races.

On 14 August 2007, Spyker Cars announced that it would need to sell all or part of the team due to a potential split from its parent company.

On 3 September 2007, Indian billionaire Vijay Mallya (chairman and CEO of Toyota sponsors Kingfisher Airlines) and Dutch entrepreneur Michiel Mol (Spyker's Formula One Director), stated that the Spyker board had accepted their offer, making them the new owners of the Spyker Formula One team. The team was renamed Force India Formula One Team for the 2008 season.

=== Spyker Squadron ===
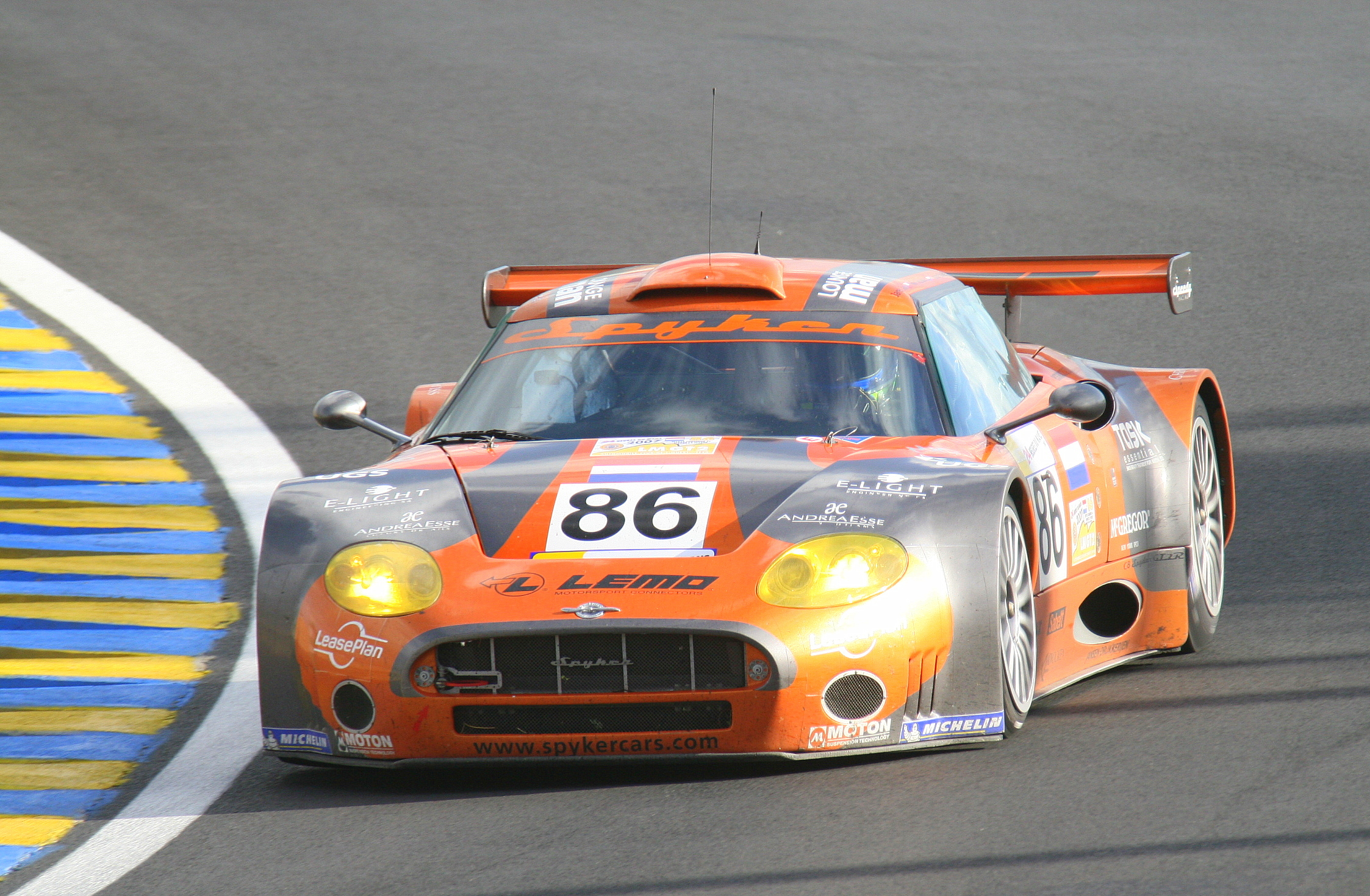
C8 Squadron at the 2007 Le Mans.

The Spyker Squadron was the company's factory racing team, competing in events such as the 24 Hours of Le Mans, the Le Mans Series, occasional entries in the FIA GT Championship, and the 12 hours of Sebring. Spyker also supplied a car to its Swiss distributor, Speedy Garages, which competed under the name Speedy Racing Team.
