= Michiel Mol =

Dutch businessman

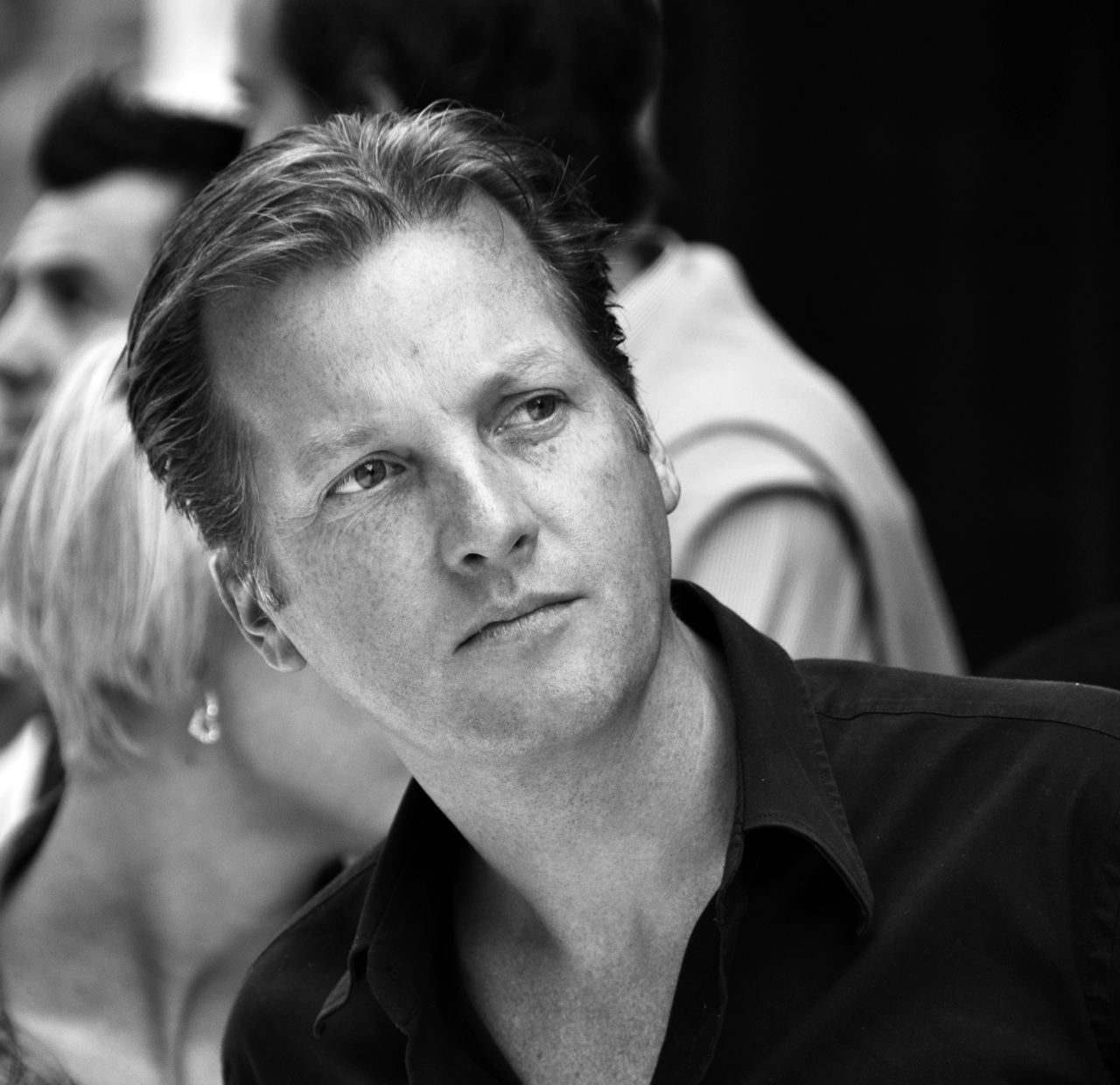
- Mol in 2010
- Born: August 4, 1969 (age 56); Delft, Netherlands
- Education: Leiden University
- Occupation: Businessman
- Spouses: Paulien Huizinga (m. 2004; div. 2011); Marlous Mens (m. 2018)
- Children: 2

Michiel Mol (born 4 August 1969) is a Dutch businessman, and former director of Spyker F1 and Force India.

== Early life and career ==
Mol was born in Delft, Netherlands. His father, Jan Mol, co-founded the software company Volmac in 1966. The company was successful, and following flotation on the stock market in 1988, Volmac was purchased by CAP Gemini in 1992.

After obtaining a master's degree in computer science from Leiden University, Mol himself went into the software business. In 1993 he set up Lost Boys with several friends, developing software for the CD-ROM market. With the rapid growth of the Internet, the company started making internet software as well as moving into game development. Lost Boys then merged with Swedish company IconMedialab in 2001.

Mol remained on the board and kept the Lost Boys Games division, before establishing a new company called Media Republic, aiming to use new technology to market products. Lost Boys Games was transformed into Guerrilla Games, notable for developing the PlayStation 2 game Killzone, during 2004 and a year later it was sold to Sony.

== Formula One ==
Mol supported Dutch driver Jos Verstappen through his Lost Boys brand, including sponsoring the Arrows Grand Prix team. Later, Mol would support another Dutch driver Christijan Albers. In 2006, Mol led a group of directors with the Spyker Cars company to purchase the Midland F1 Team from Alex Shnaider for $106.6million. Mol was appointed F1 Race Director of the newly formed team. On 16 May 2007, Mol was appointed interim CEO of Spyker Cars.

During 2007, there were reports of financial difficulties at Spyker Cars and rumours they would split from the Formula One team may split. Mol resigned as Interim CEO to concentrate on the Formula One team project in August. In September 2007, Spyker Cars announced that a consortium of Michiel Mol, Jan Mol and Vijay Mallya had purchased the team for €80million. From 2008, the team became known as Force India and Mol retained a share until 2018 when the team went into administration and was purchased by Lawrence Stroll.

== Space Expedition Corporation ==
Mol is a co-founder of Space Expedition Corporation (SXC), which intends to offer suborbital space tourism flights and scientific research missions out of Space Port Curaçao. The company was since renamed XCOR Aerospace, and filed for bankruptcy in 2017.

== Personal life ==
In July 2004, Mol married Paulien Huizinga, a former Miss Universe Netherlands and now a Dutch TV personality. They lived together in Blaricum. Together they have a daughter and a son. In August 2011 it was announced that Huizinga and Mol would divorce. In 2018, Mol married Marlous Mens.
