= Victor Muller =

Dutch businessman (born 1959)

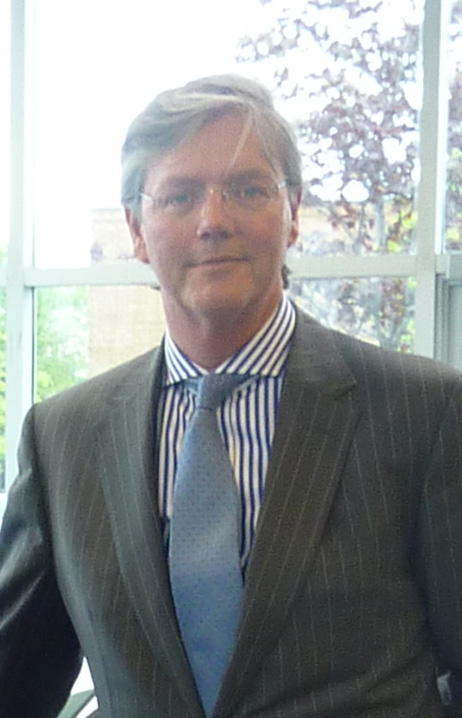
- Born: Victor Roberto Muller; September 13, 1959 (age 67); Amsterdam, North Holland, Netherlands
- Other name: VM
- Education: Leiden University (LL.M.)
- Occupations: Spyker N.V. (CEO and President)

Victor Roberto Muller (born September 13, 1959) is a Dutch businessman, founder of Spyker Cars, CEO of Spyker N.V., and former chairman and CEO of Saab Automobile AB.

== Education and early career ==
Muller studied law at Leiden University. After graduating with an LL.M. degree in 1984, he became a lawyer for the Amsterdam office of law firm Baker & McKenzie. In 1989, he joined the management team of offshore company Heerema in Leiden. A management buyout made him part owner of salvage and towing company Wijsmuller in IJmuiden. From 1992 onwards, Muller led several companies, such as Emergo Mode Groep (Emergo Fashion Group), which would be launched on the Amsterdam Stock Exchange as McGregor Fashion Group.

== Spyker Cars ==
Muller and Maarten de Bruijn bought the name to the Dutch car company Spyker Cars in 2000, renewing the Spyker name which had been used surrounding car production in the 1920s. Muller was the CEO of the company until May 16, 2007, when he was succeeded by Michiel Mol. Muller continued to work for the company as chief designer for a period, but returned to the CEO seat later the same year, due to the split up between Spyker Cars and Spyker F1 (later Force India) while Mol continued as CEO for the latter.

Muller was found guilty of sharing insider information in 2007. He sent an email to bank Theodoor Gilissen, requesting they not sell shares used as security for a personal loan. In the email Muller stated that Spyker would soon release a favourable press-release, which would increase the value of his shares. Victor Muller was initially fined €96,000. The fine was reduced in May 2012 to €11,400.

On 2 December 2014 Spyker NV was granted a financial restructuring by the Dutch court "Midden Nederland". Spyker needs protection from creditors for its liquidity problems. Victor R. Muller, Spyker founder and chief executive, said “Over the past few years, Spyker has faced a number of serious difficulties and challenges resulting from, among others, the legacy of the F1 era and the acquisition of Saab Automobile AB,”.

On 18 December 2014 Spyker NV was declared bankrupt by the Dutch court "Midden Nederland". Victor R. Muller, Spyker founder and chief executive, said “In 2000 our objective was to found a global sports car manufacturer, and we did just that. During this time we deployed several challenging activities. These have affected the company, and contributed to our decline,”.

Daughter company Spyker Services was taking care of aftersales to the Spyker car owners. In 2019, payment problems were reported at this company, that had not paid rent for its storage facilities in Zeewolde. On 20 March 2020, the company was declared bankrupt. In March 2023, the Spyker Services bankruptcy trustee claimed 3.1 million euros from Muller, because the British Spyker Ltd, with which Muller wanted to continue the sportscar company's activities, had wrongly withdrawn assets from Spyker Services.

In 2025, Muller reached a settlement with the bankruptcy trustee of Spyker, regaining the rights to the Spyker brand. In May 2026, RTL Nieuws reported that the settlement had yielded €350,000, compared with the more than €3 million initially sought by the trustee. According to the trustee's final report, no distribution to creditors could be made from the bankruptcy estate.

== Saab Automobile AB ==
Muller was also the chairman of the company Swedish Automobile, which was formed after the takeover of Saab Automobile by Spyker Cars. Saab Automobile was declared bankrupt in December 2011. A meeting on Saab's bankruptcy was held at the District Court of Vänersborg on the 16 April 2012. In April 2012, the Swedish curators made public that SAAB has a debt of over US$2 billion after subtracting the value of assets.

In March 2011, a Swedish biography of Victor Muller was published, Cirkus Muller, by journalist Jens B Nordström.

In August 2012, Muller, stated that Spyker Cars would sue General Motors over Saab's bankruptcy. Muller, stated, "Ever since we were forced to file for Saab Automobile’s bankruptcy in December of last year, we have worked relentlessly on the preparation for this lawsuit, which seeks to compensate Spyker and Saab for the massive damages we have incurred as a result of GM’s unlawful actions". On 22 June 2013, a District Court Judge dismissed the case. According to Judge Gershwin A. Drain, "General Motors had a contractual right to approve or disapprove the proposed transaction," and "The court is going to grant the motion to dismiss the matter."

Spyker Cars NV appealed the ruling. The appeal was heard at the 6th U.S. Circuit Court of Appeals in Cincinnati. The court said on Friday October 24, 2014 that GM did not intentionally interfere with the Dutch company's effort to sell Saab to Zhejiang Youngman Co, leading to Saab's bankruptcy. Judge Eugene Siler said GM's actions were not malicious, and that it had "legitimate business concerns" about the sale, including who would benefit from Saab's use of its technology. Siler said that Spyker's claim was "fatally flawed".

Since May 2013, Muller, has been a prime suspect of corporate tax evasion. As of 19 February 2016 Muller will be prosecuted by the Swedish tax authorities. In 2017, a Swedish court ruled him not guilty.
