= Volkswagen Group Scalable Systems Platform =

Modular electric car platform

The Volkswagen Group Scalable Systems Platform (SSP) is a modular car platform for electric cars being developed by the Volkswagen Group. SSP was announced in July 2021, as part of Volkswagen's "New Auto" strategy, to have a "single battery electric vehicle (BEV) platform across all the group's brands". SSP is planned to be introduced in 2029, and intend to succeed the MEB and PPE platforms. It is also expected to replace Volkswagen's internal combustion engine platforms. As with MEB it is expected that the platform will also be offered to other car manufacturers.

SSP is intended to have a common platform with different modules. The modules will have a limited number of variants to reduce production complexity. This will allow the Volkswagen brands to create differentiated cars, whilst having a high degree of standardisation. As well as a shared car platform, there will also be common battery, software and autonomous driving systems.

Reportedly Volkswagen will develop a variant for traditional cars under the code name "Trinity", whilst Audi is creating the variant for SUVs under the code name "Apollon".

== Software platform ==
=== VW.os ===
VW.os (Volkswagen Operating System) developed by CARIAD to unify hardware and software under one tech stack.

== See also ==
- Volkswagen Group MEB platform
- Volkswagen Group Premium Platform Electric
- List of Volkswagen Group platforms
- VW.AC (Volkswagen Automotive Cloud)
