= Audi A6 e-tron =

Battery electric executive car

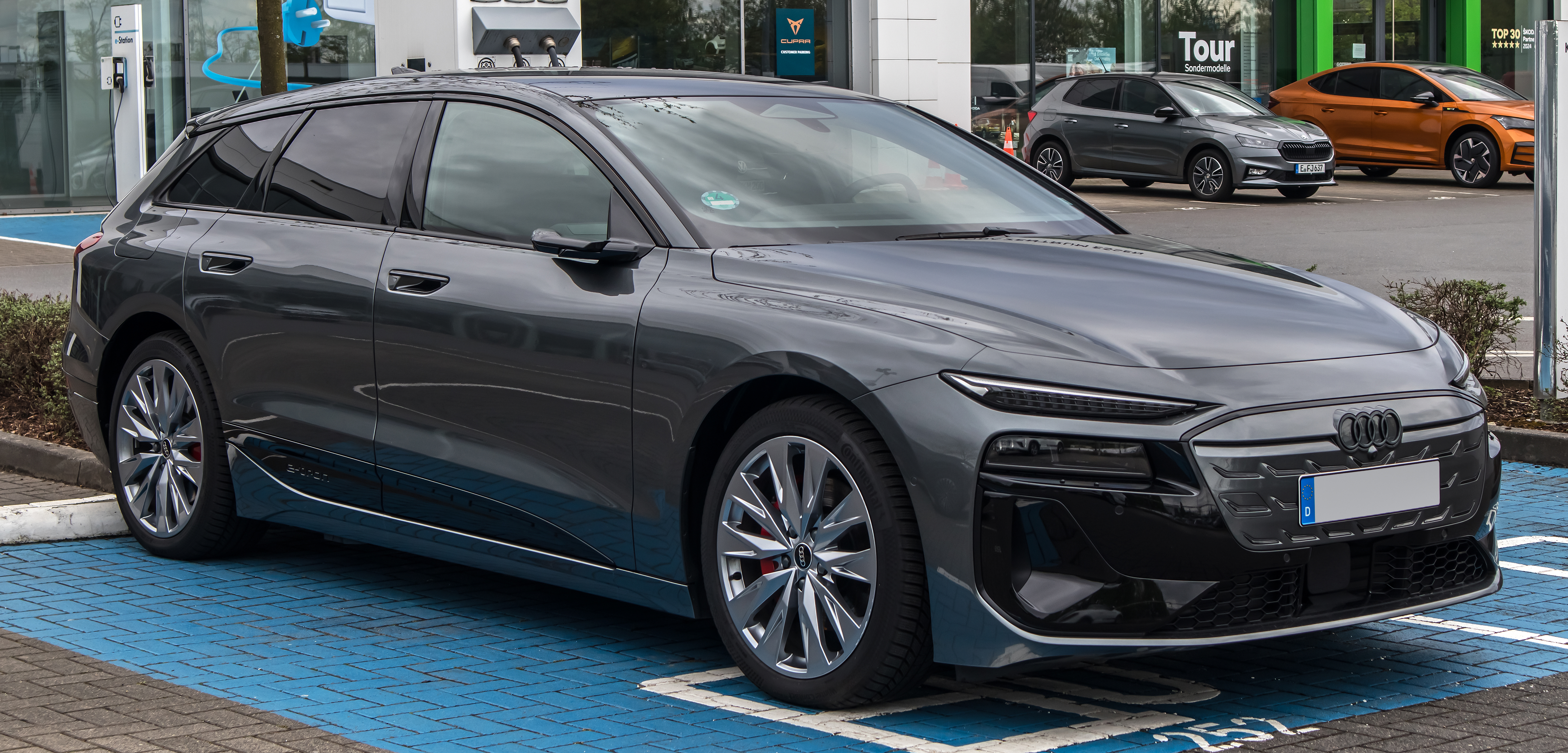
- Audi A6 Avant e-tron

Overview
- Manufacturer: Audi
- Production: 2024–present
- Assembly: Germany: Ingolstadt; China: Changchun (Audi-FAW, A6L e-tron)
- Designer: Sascha Heyde

Body and chassis
- Class: Executive car (E)
- Body style: 5-door liftback (Sportback); 4-door sedan (A6L e-tron); 5-door station wagon (Avant)
- Layout: Rear-motor, rear-wheel-drive; Dual-motor, four-wheel-drive
- Platform: Premium Platform Electric (PPE)
- Related: Audi Q6 e-tron; Porsche Macan

Powertrain
- Electric motor: 1× permanent magnet synchronous; 2× permanent magnet synchronous (quattro); 1x permanent magnet synchronous + 1x induction motor (S6)
- Power output: 210–315 kW (282–422 hp; 286–428 PS) (A6); 370 kW (496 hp; 503 PS) (S6)
- Transmission: Single-speed gear reduction
- Battery: 83 kWh NMC811 CATL; 100 kWh NMC811 CATL
- Electric range: 598–750 km (372–466 mi) (WLTP); 640–666 km (398–414 mi) (S6 e-tron, WLTP)
- Plug-in charging: CCS Type1/2: 225–270 kW DC; SAE J1772/Type 2: 9.6‑11 kW AC

Dimensions
- Wheelbase: 2,946 mm (116.0 in); 3,076 mm (121.1 in) (A6L e-tron)
- Length: 4,928 mm (194.0 in); 5,073 mm (199.7 in) (A6L e-tron)
- Width: 1,923 mm (75.7 in); 1,942 mm (76.5 in) (A6L e-tron)
- Height: 1,465–1,487 mm (57.7–58.5 in) (Sportback); 1,504–1,525 mm (59.2–60.0 in) (Avant); 1,522 mm (59.9 in) (A6L e-tron)
- Kerb weight: 2,100–2,410 kg (4,630–5,310 lb)

The Audi A6 e‑tron is a battery electric executive car made by German company Audi and was revealed on 31 July 2024.

It is available in liftback and station wagon body styles and is built on the PPE platform.

== Background ==
The Audi A6 e‑tron Concept was unveiled at the 2021 Auto Shanghai, followed by the 2021 Milan Design Week. Featuring a Sportback body, it included 22-inch wheels, LED projectors built in into each side of the body, and a 100 kWh battery.

In March 2022, an Avant version of the concept was unveiled. It has a drag coefficient of 0.24, helped by larger diffuser tunnels.

On 31 July 2024 the production versions of the A6 e‑tron line were revealed along with preliminary details, with preorders opening in September that year, and deliveries expected to begin in February 2025.

It launched with both the standard A6 and high performance S6 versions in both liftback and wagon body styles, branded as Sportback and Avant respectively.

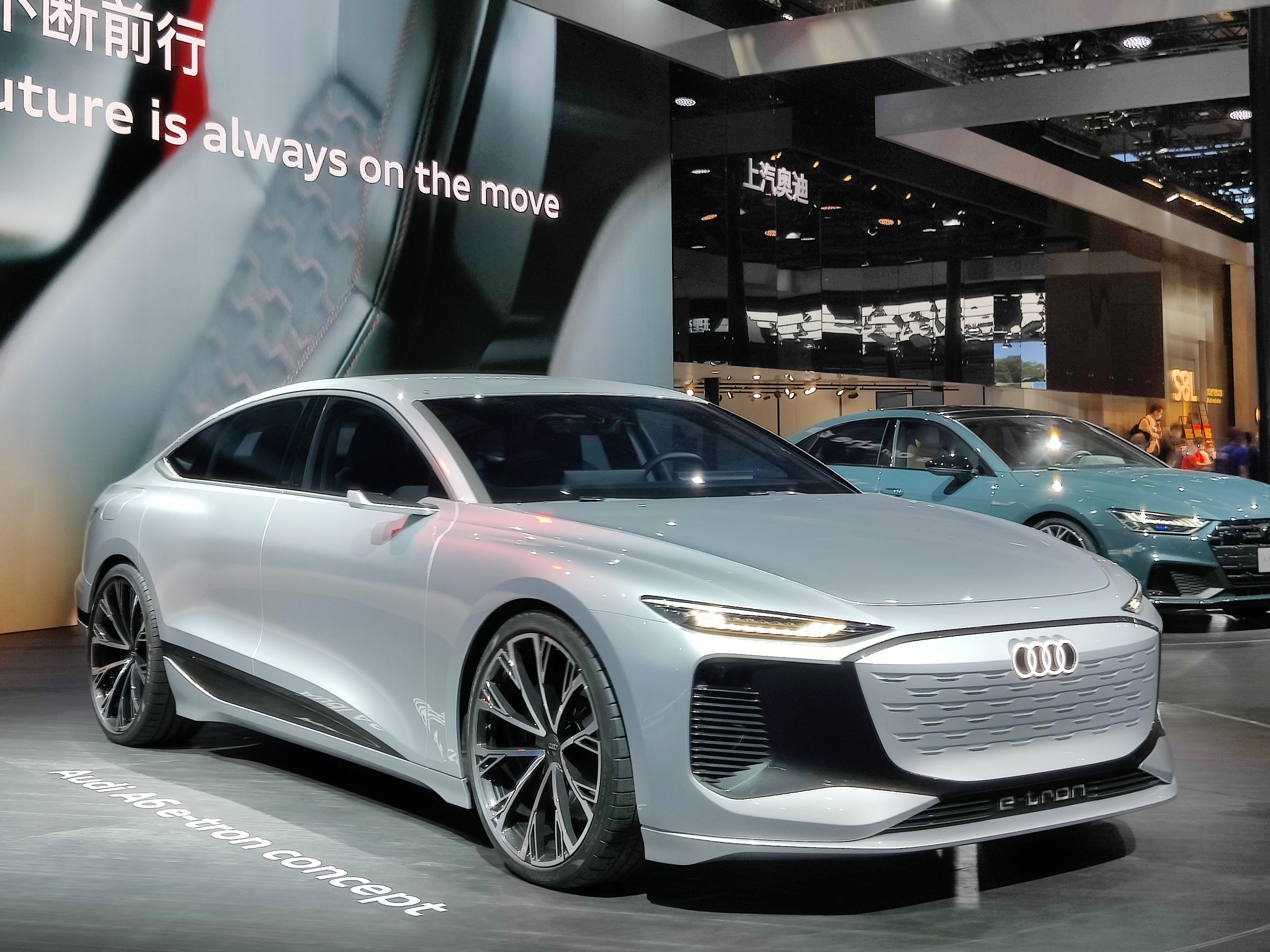
Audi A6 e-tron Concept

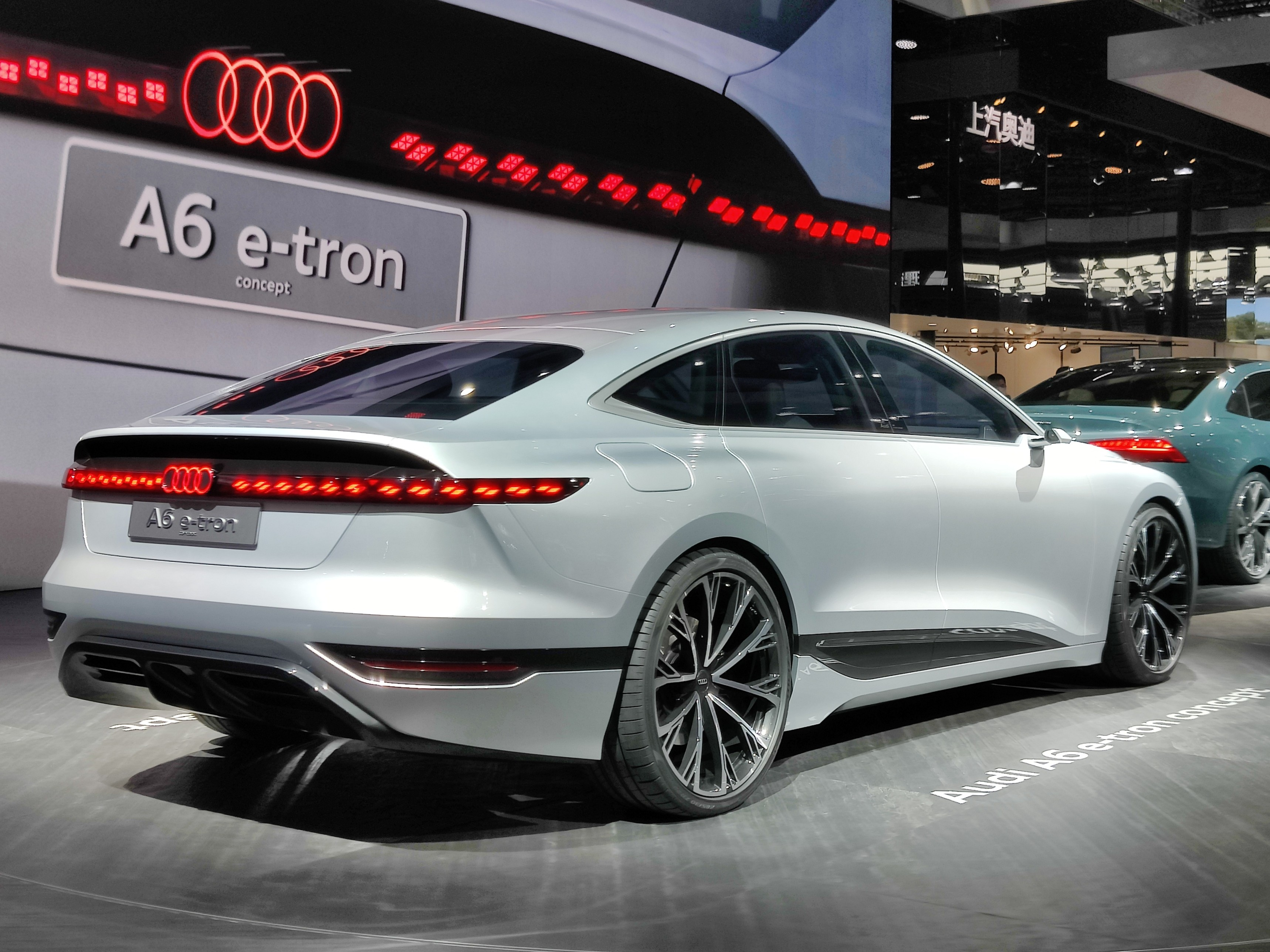
Audi A6 e-tron Concept rear

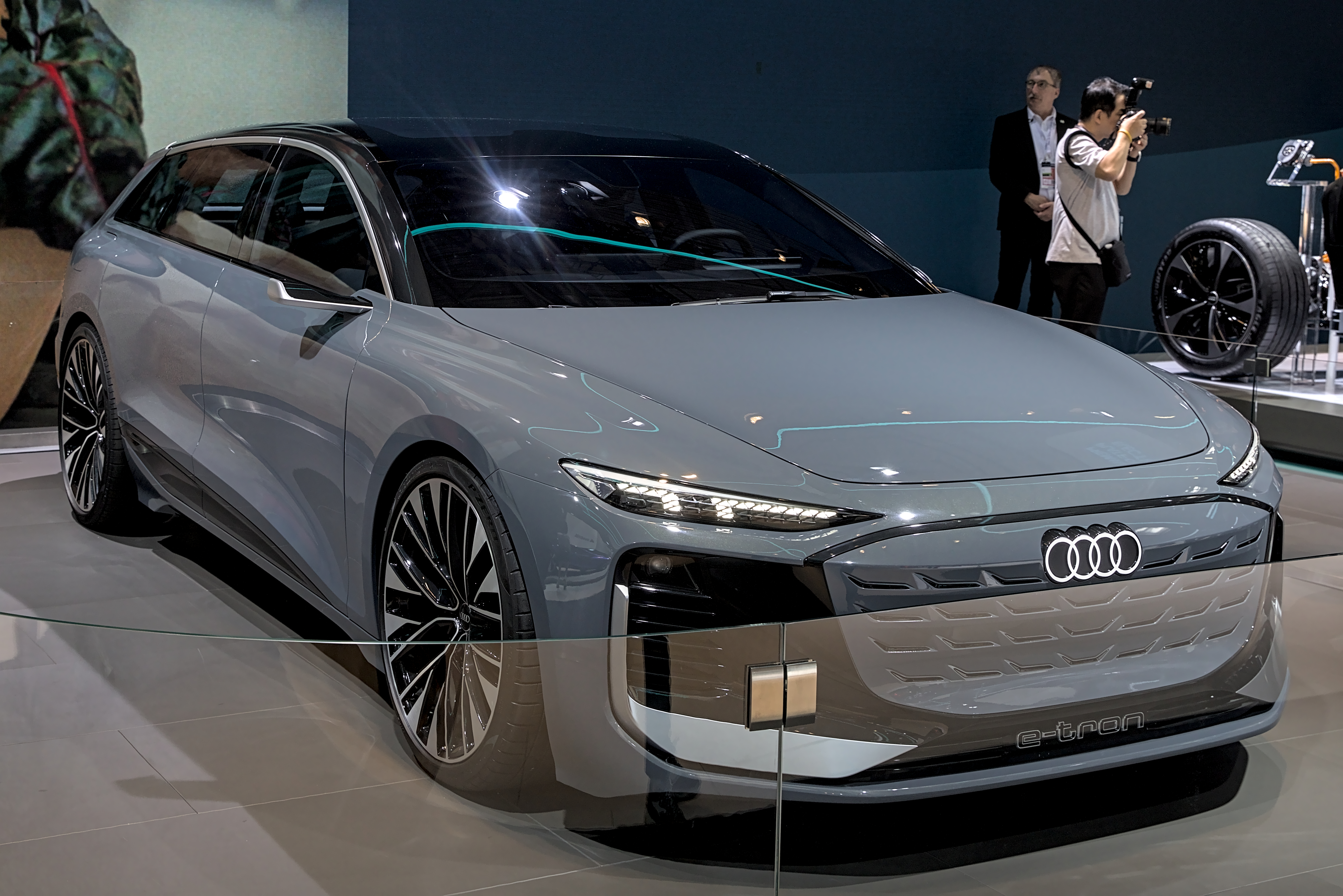
Audi A6 Avant e-tron Concept

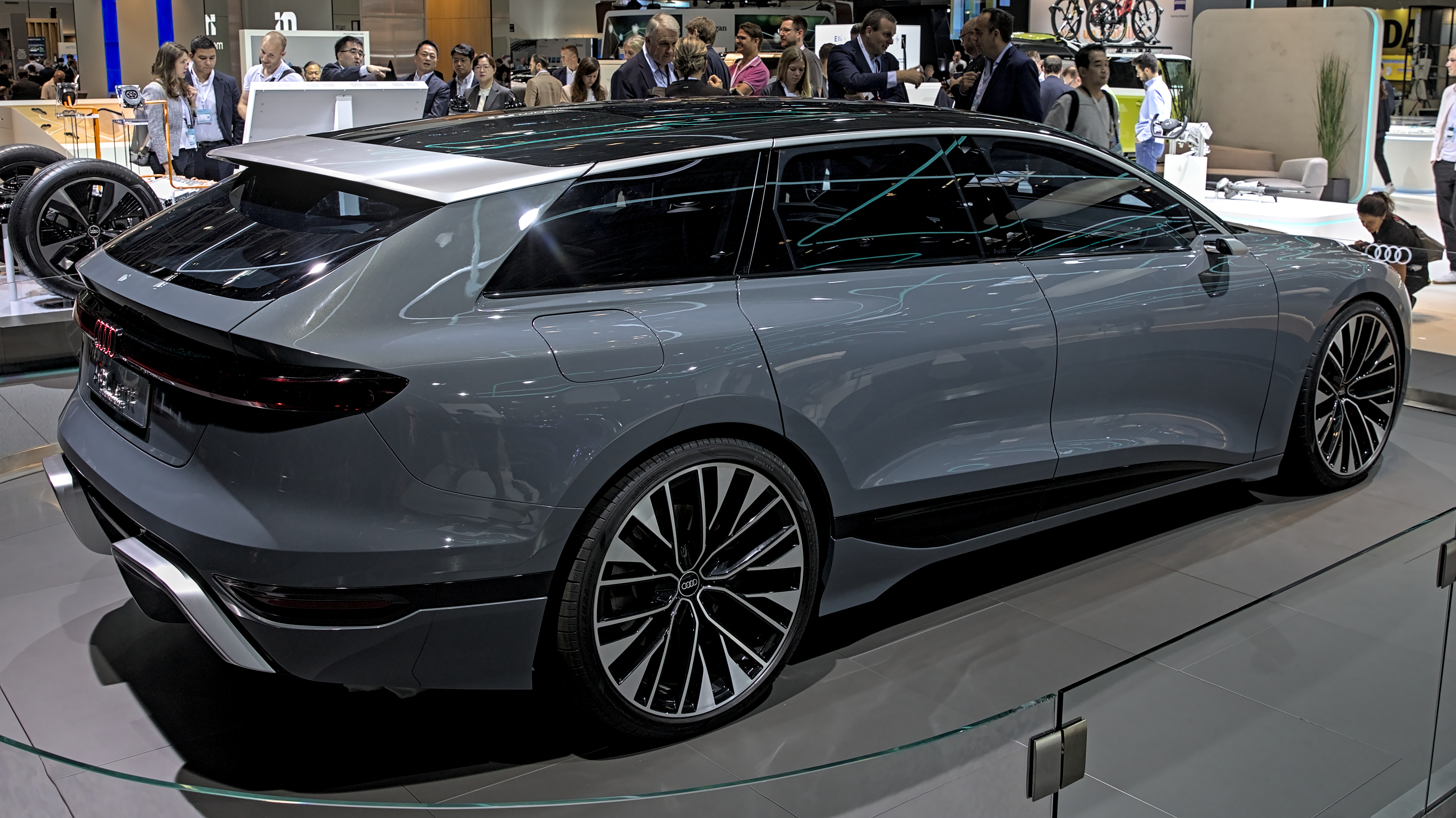
Audi A6 Avant e-tron Concept rear

== Overview ==
The A6 e‑tron is considered to be the 'low floor' counterpart to the Q6 e‑tron as the vehicles share a platform and are closely related to each other.

The front of the A6 consists of a body colour grille motif surrounded by a 'black mask', which helps conceal the ADAS sensors and low mounted headlights, which are split from the daytime running lights that sit above. The rear is characterized by a light bar consisting of 450 pixels that are used to display user selectable animations or display vehicle-to-X signals.

The Sportback model has a drag coefficient of 0.21 which Audi claims is best in class at time of launch, and the Avant has a drag coefficient of 0.24. This is achieved in part due to air curtain vents in the front bumper, active grille flaps, smooth and flat underfloor, aerodynamically optimized wheel choices, and optional virtual side mirrors.

The dashboard features a 11.9-inch OLED screen that serves as the digital gauge cluster mounted alongside a 14.5-inch OLED touchscreen infotainment system with integrated ChatGPT assisted voice command system, flanked by an optional 10.9-inch passenger entertainment screen with a togglable privacy filter. An optional augmented reality head-up display that can display navigation information and road signs is also offered. A touch capacitive control panel on the driver's side door contains controls such as headlight settings, door locking and mirror adjustments.

The interior is fully leather-free and is made from some recycled materials. Surfaces such as the dashboard and door panels are upholstered in fabric with contrast stitching. An optional panoramic roof is available with a digital liquid crystal sunshade that can be closed to either front or rear is offered. A 20-speaker Bang & Olufsen audio system with two speakers integrated into each front headrest is available. Also optional is a four-zone climate control system.

The A6 comes standard with steel springs with an optional air suspension system; the S6 comes standard with adaptive air suspension. It is also equipped with a 27 L (0.95 cu ft) frunk which can be opened by placing the key fob over the front of the hood, and the rear power hatch is foot activated with a light indicating the location of the sensor. There are two charging ports, with both capable of AC charging while the driver's side is also able to DC fast charge.

The A6 and S6 are capable of towing 750 kg (1,650 lb) unbraked trailers, or 2,100 kg (4,600 lb) at a 12% slope, and can carry up to 100 kg (220 lb) on the roof.

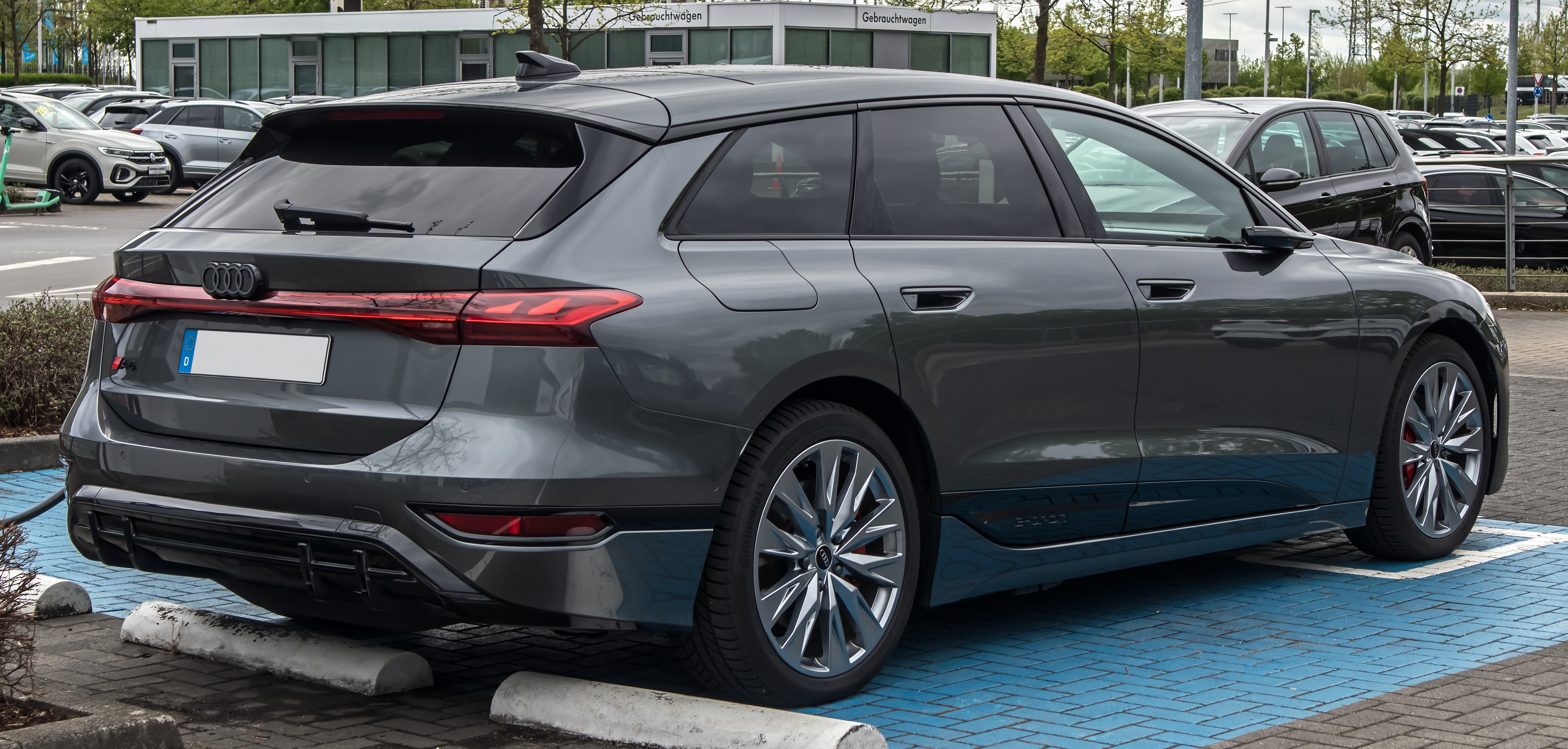
Audi A6 Avant e-tron rear

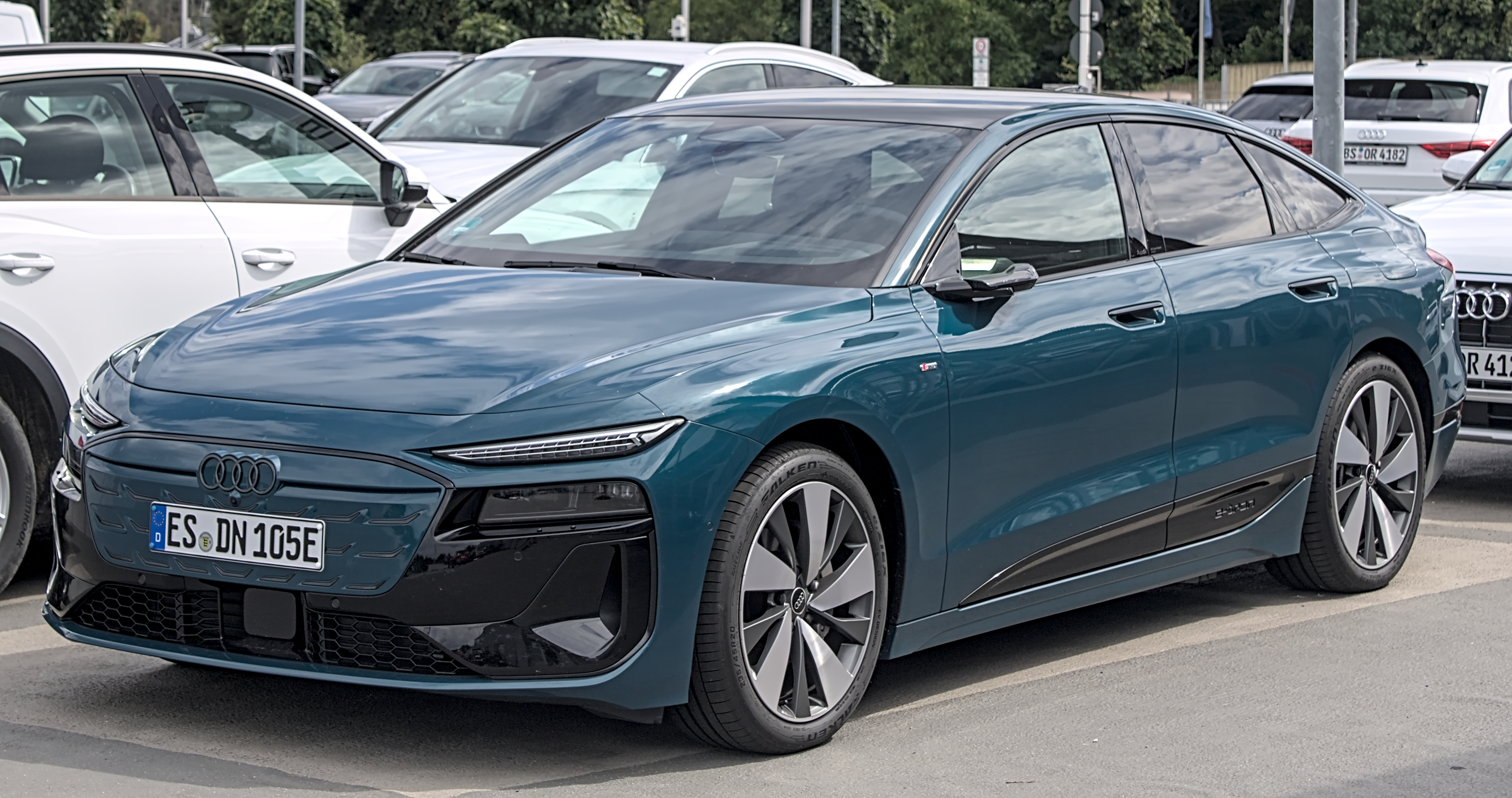
Audi A6 e-tron

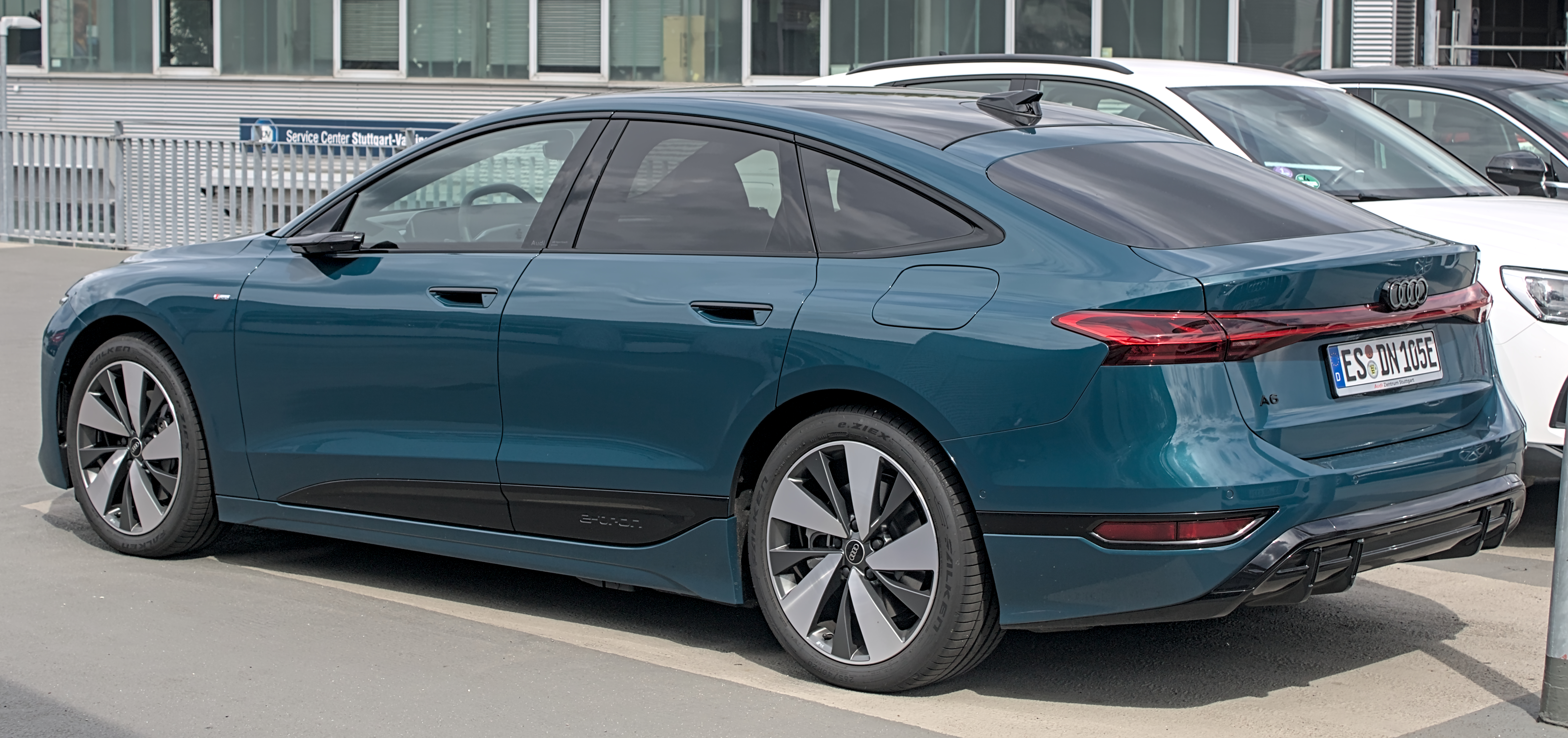
Audi A6 e-tron rear

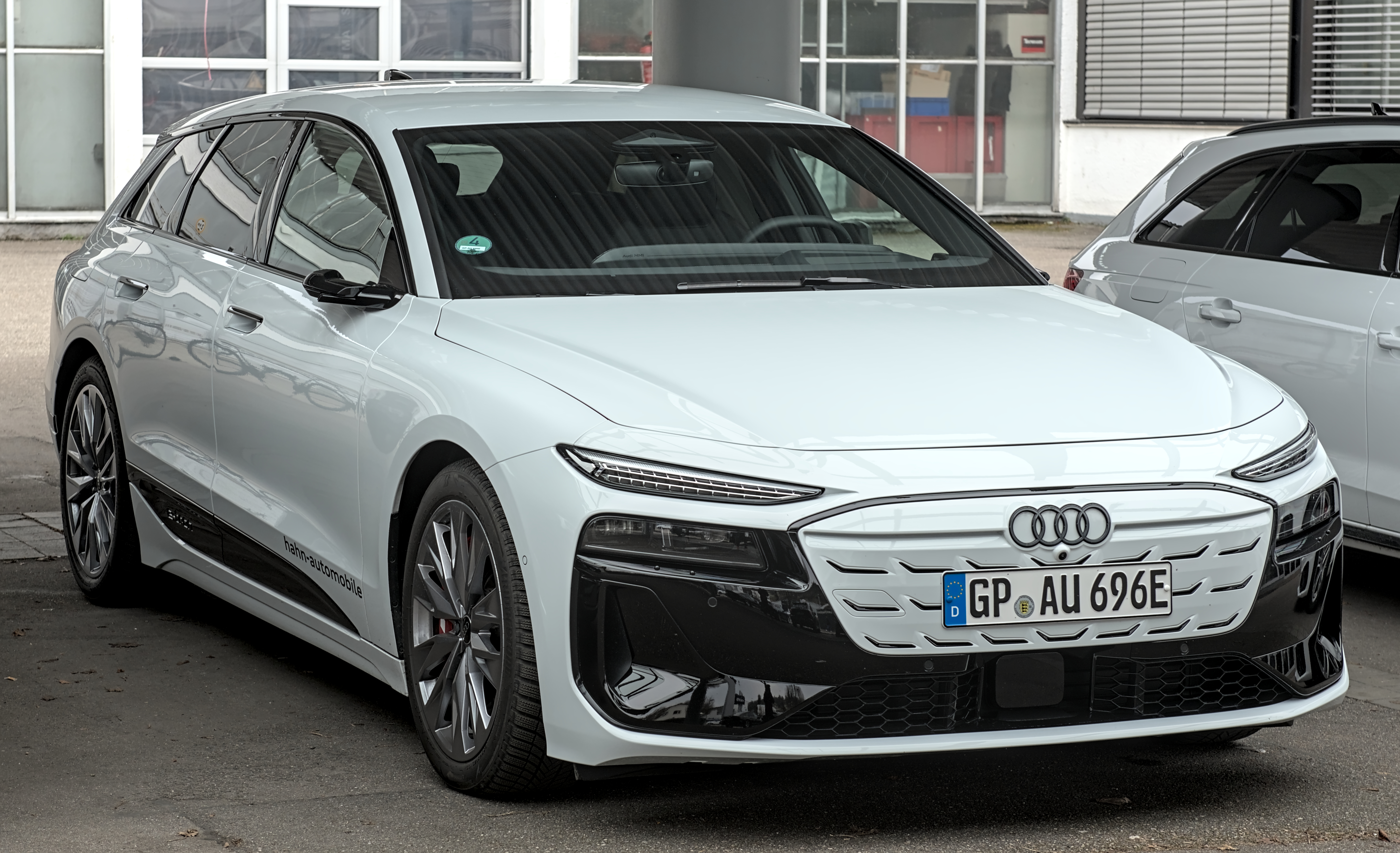
Audi S6 Avant e-tron

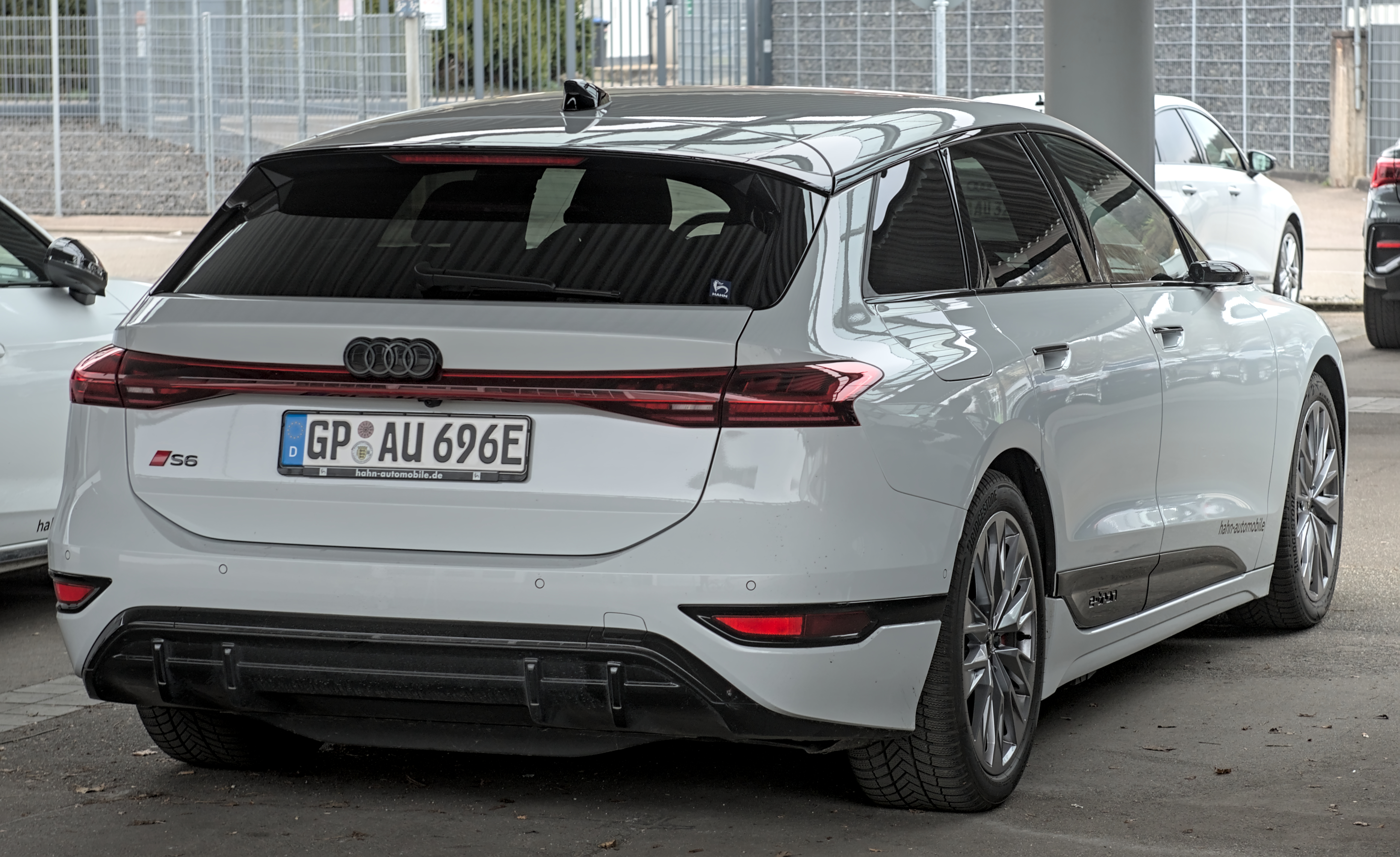
Audi S6 Avant e-tron rear

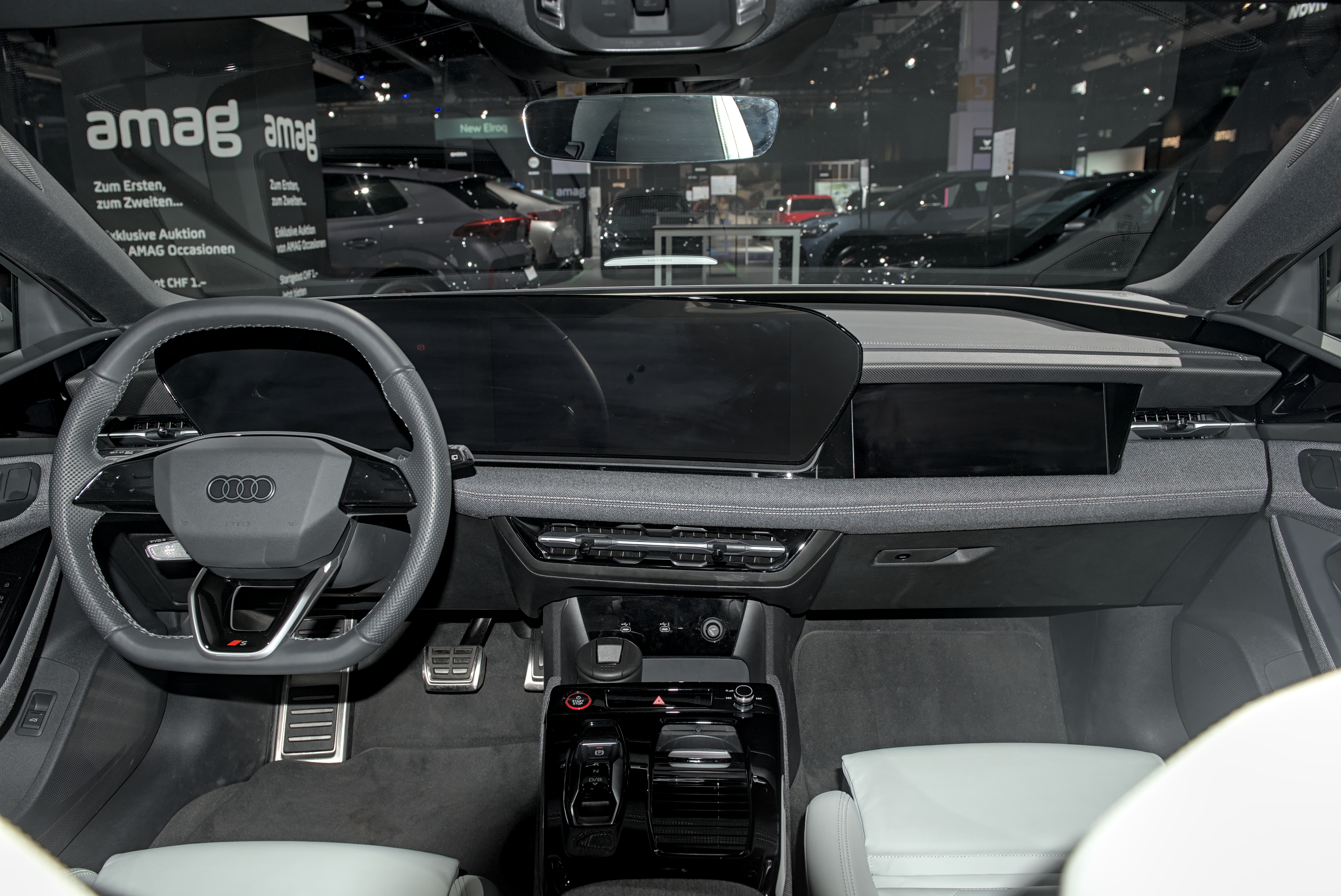
Audi S6 Avant e-tron interior

== Safety ==
ANCAP test results Audi A6 e-tron (2025, aligned with Euro NCAP)
Test	Points	%
Overall:	5 /5 stars	
Adult occupant:	37.07	92%
Child occupant:	45	91%
Pedestrian:	47.41	75%
Safety assist:	13.95	77%

Euro NCAP test results A6 e-tron Avant performance 'Basis' RWD (LHD) (2025)
Test	Points	%
Overall:	5 /5 stars	
Adult occupant:	37.1	92%
Child occupant:	45	91%
Pedestrian:	47.4	75%
Safety assist:	14.4	80%

== Markets ==
=== North America ===
The A6 will be available with both rear-wheel drive and quattro all-wheel drive powertrains in the U.S., while only the latter will be offered in Canada. The Avant wagon body style is not offered on either the A6 or S6. Features such as camera-powered virtual side mirrors and complex turn signal animations are not available due to differing regulations, and are replaced with conventional mirrors and less complex turn signals. Adaptive matrix LED headlights and illuminated Audi logo in the grille are available in Canada but are not offered in the U.S.

Pricing information was released on March 12, 2025 with sales expected to begin in the summer that year.

=== Europe ===
The A6 is initially exclusively available with the rear-wheel drive powertrain and 100 kWh battery, with the S6 being the only way to access all-wheel drive. The smaller 83 kWh battery and quattro variants became available in late October 2024.

=== China ===
The Chinese market will receive a long wheelbase version called the A6L e-tron at Auto Shanghai 2025.

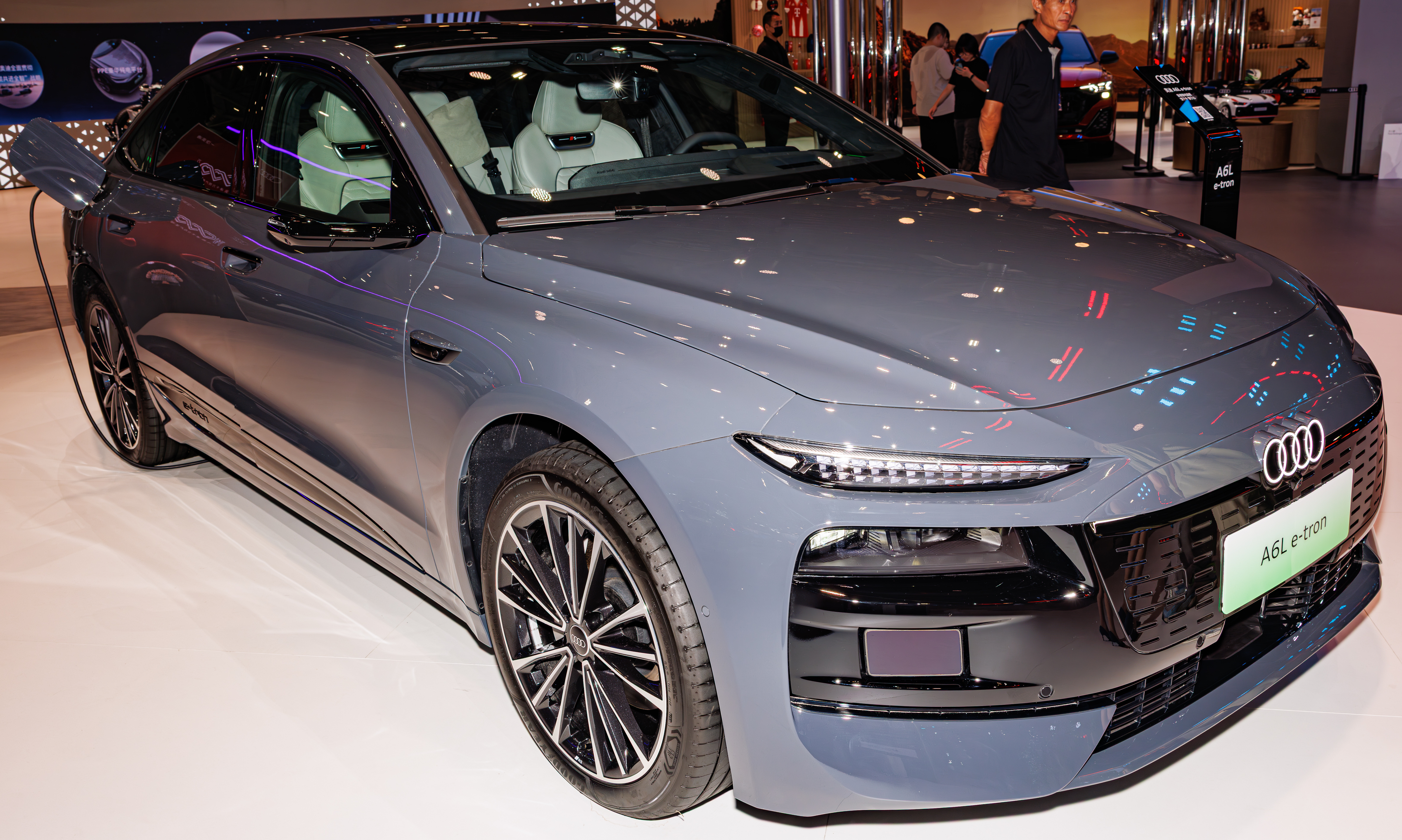
Audi A6L e-tron

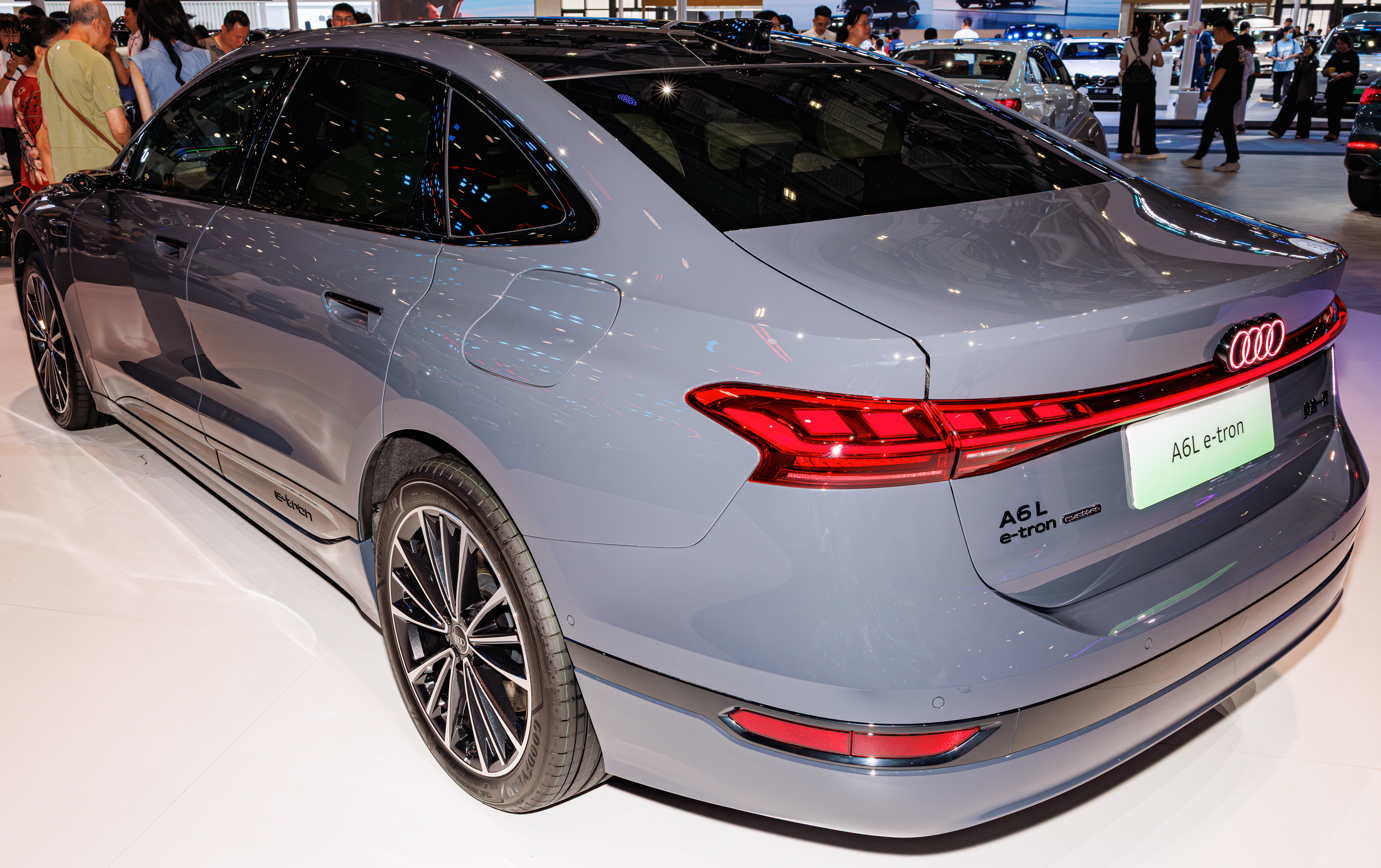
Audi A6L e-tron rear

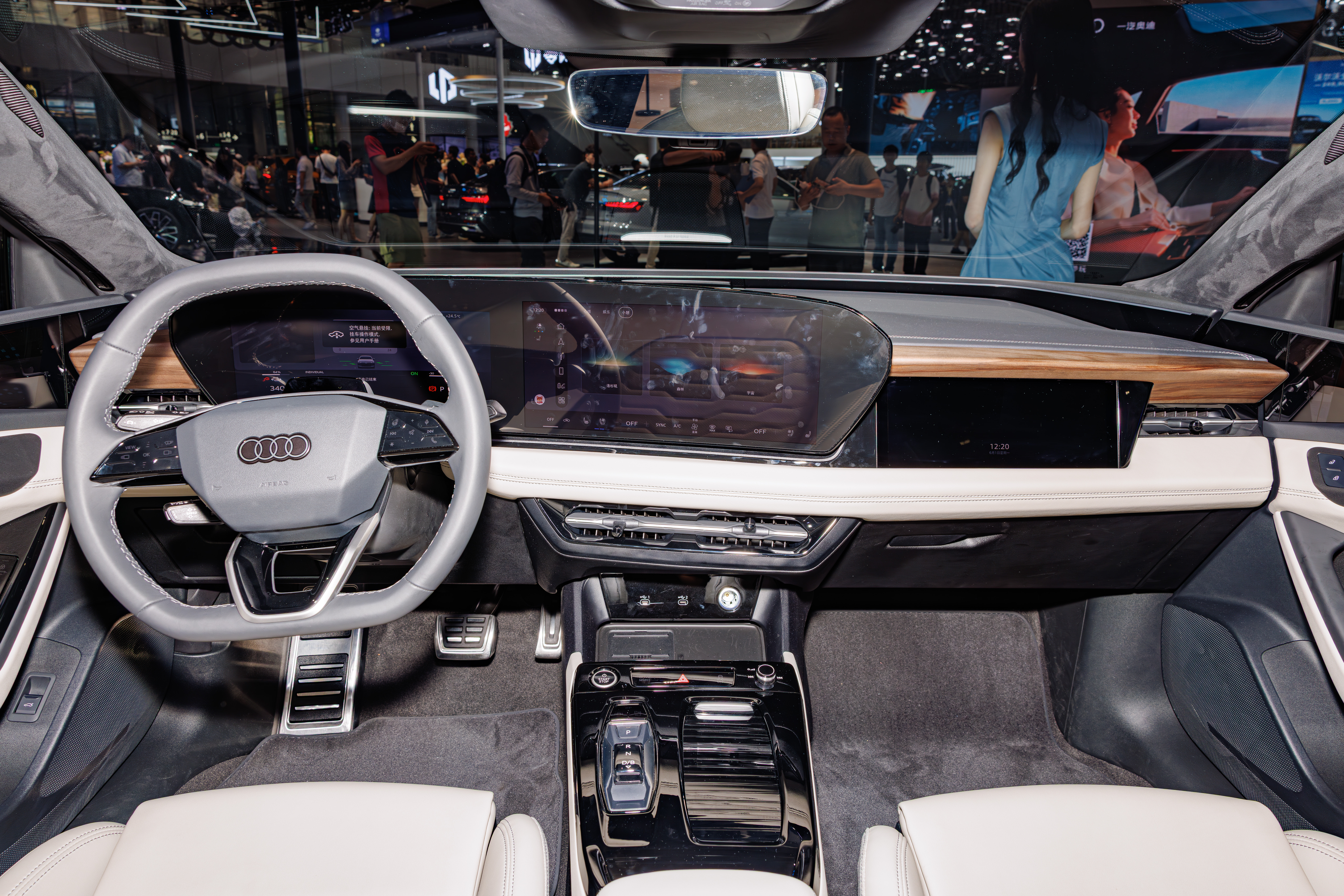
Interior

== Powertrain ==
There are four available powertrains. The standard model is the only one to come with the smaller 83 kWh battery pack, and outputs 210 kW (282 hp; 286 PS) (240 kW (322 hp; 326 PS) with launch control boost) from a single motor. The 'performance' rear-wheel drive model has a single permanent magnet synchronous motor outputting 270 kW (362 hp; 367 PS) and 565 N⋅m (417 lb⋅ft) of torque, and can be temporarily increased to 280 kW (375 hp; 381 PS) in launch control mode. The 'quattro' model makes a combined 315 kW (422 hp; 428 PS) (340 kW (456 hp; 462 PS) in launch control boost) in a slightly rear-biased all-wheel drive configuration.

The S6 e‑tron outputs 370 kW (496 hp; 503 PS) from an asynchronous induction motor on the front axle and a permanent magnet synchronous motor on the rear axle. Power can be temporarily boosted to 405 kW (543 hp; 551 PS) in launch control mode. The S6 also has a higher top speed of 240 km/h (149 mph) compared to the A6's 210 km/h (130 mph).

The 100 kWh gross capacity (94.4 kWh usable capacity) battery consists of twelve modules of 15 prismatic NMC cells connected in series, for a total of 180 cells. It is designed with a 800-volt electrical architecture, which allows for up to 270 kW peak DC fast charging rates, leading to a claimed 10-80% charge time of 21 minutes. When using 400-volt DC charging, the battery will be charged as two different banks at up to 135 kW. The onboard Level 2 AC charger is rated for up to 11 kW in Europe or 9.6 kW in the US, with a 22 kW option available in the future. A smaller 83 kWh gross capacity battery with 10 modules is planned to be offered later, with up to 225 kW peak DC fast charging and also using an 800-volt electrical architecture.

The motors use 'bar wound' hairpin windings, and the inverter uses silicon carbide semiconductors. The single-speed gear reduction gearbox uses a dry sump system with an electric oil pump. The regenerative braking system can recuperate at up to 220 kW, and has user selectable modes to enable regen-free coasting or near one-pedal driving.

Powertrains
Model		Battery	Power				Range		0–100 km/h (62 mph)	Top speed
Model		Battery	Front	Rear	Total	Boost	WLTP	EPA	0–100 km/h (62 mph)	Top speed
A6 e-tron	Sportback	83 kWh (75.8 kWh usable) 10-module	—	210 kW	210 kW (280 hp; 290 PS)	240 kW (320 hp; 330 PS)	615–627 km (382–390 mi)	—	6 s	210 km/h (130 mph)
A6 e-tron	Avant	83 kWh (75.8 kWh usable) 10-module	—	210 kW	210 kW (280 hp; 290 PS)	240 kW (320 hp; 330 PS)	598 km (372 mi)	—	6 s	210 km/h (130 mph)
A6 e-tron performance	Sportback	100 kWh (94.9 kWh usable) 12-module	—	270 kW PMSM	270 kW (360 hp; 370 PS)	280 kW (380 hp; 380 PS)	750 km (470 mi)	370–392 mi (595–631 km)	5.4 s	210 km/h (130 mph)
A6 e-tron performance	Avant	100 kWh (94.9 kWh usable) 12-module	—	270 kW PMSM	270 kW (360 hp; 370 PS)	280 kW (380 hp; 380 PS)	720 km (450 mi)	—	5.4 s	210 km/h (130 mph)
A6 e-tron quattro	Sportback	100 kWh (94.9 kWh usable) 12-module	Induction	PMSM	315 kW (422 hp; 428 PS)	340 kW (460 hp; 460 PS)	705–716 km (438–445 mi)	333–377 mi (536–607 km)	4.5 s	210 km/h (130 mph)
A6 e-tron quattro	Avant	100 kWh (94.9 kWh usable) 12-module	Induction	PMSM	315 kW (422 hp; 428 PS)	340 kW (460 hp; 460 PS)	670–685 km (416–426 mi)	—	4.5 s	210 km/h (130 mph)
S6 e-tron quattro	Sportback	100 kWh (94.9 kWh usable) 12-module	140 kW Induction	280 kW PMSM	370 kW (500 hp; 500 PS)	405 kW (543 hp; 551 PS)	670 km (416 mi)	324 mi (521 km)	3.9 s	240 km/h (149 mph)
S6 e-tron quattro	Avant	100 kWh (94.9 kWh usable) 12-module	140 kW Induction	280 kW PMSM	370 kW (500 hp; 500 PS)	405 kW (543 hp; 551 PS)	640 km (400 mi)	—	3.9 s	240 km/h (149 mph)

A6L e-tron specifications (China)
Model	Battery		Motor			Range	Kerb weight
Model	Type	Weight	Front	Rear	Total	CLTC	Kerb weight
RWD	106.7kWh					785 km (488 mi)	
Dual-motor	95.0kWh	663 kg (1,462 lb)	135 kW (181 hp; 184 PS)	270 kW (362 hp; 367 PS)	543 hp (405 kW; 551 PS)	720 km (447 mi)	2,327 kg (5,130 lb)

== Sales ==
Year	China	US
2025	392	3,931
