= Audi Q6 e-tron =

Battery electric compact luxury crossover SUV

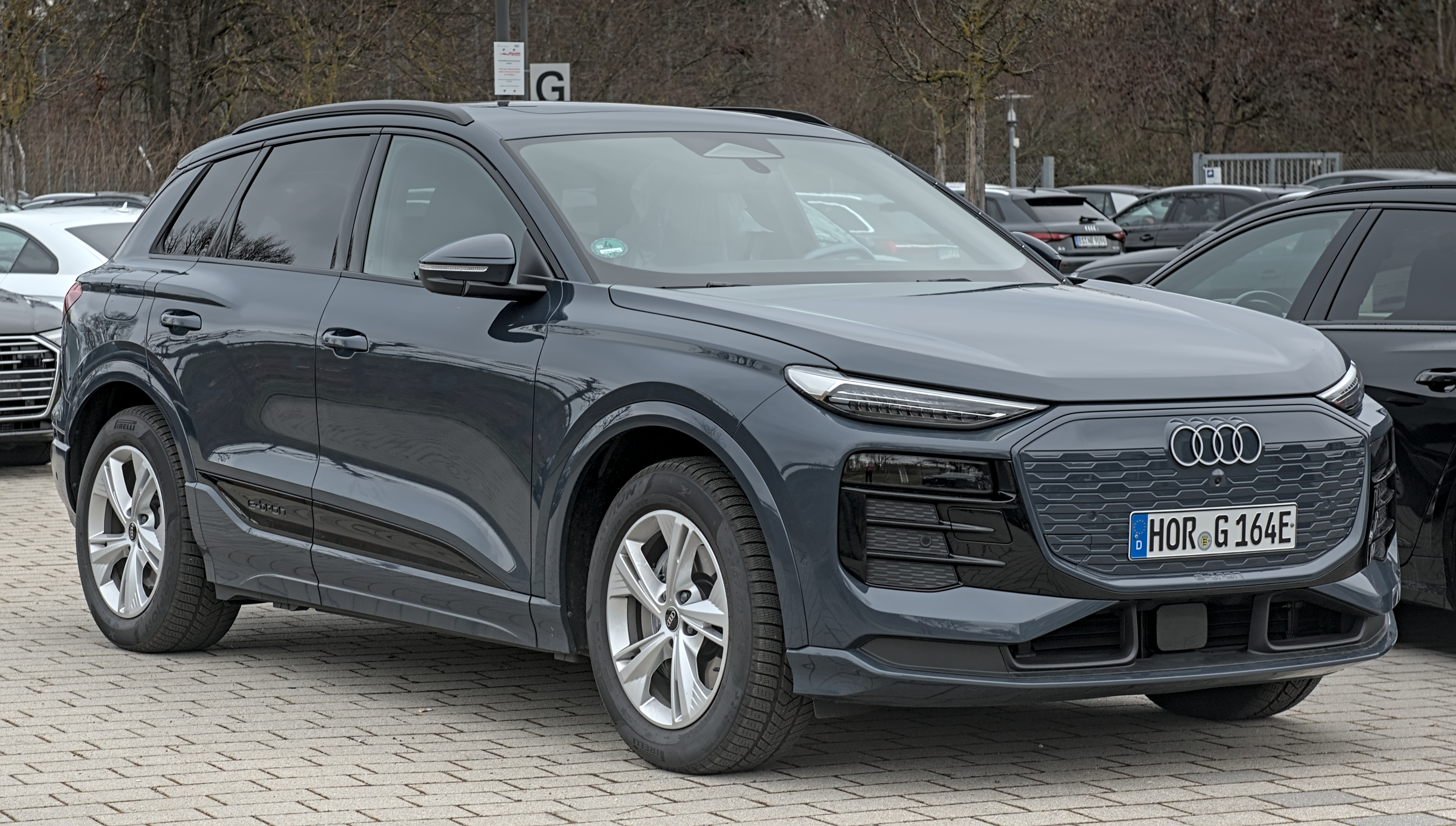

Overview
- Manufacturer: Audi
- Production: November 2023 – present
- Model years: 2025–present
- Assembly: Germany: Ingolstadt; China: Changchun (Audi-FAW)

Body and chassis
- Class: Compact luxury crossover SUV
- Body style: 5-door SUV; 5-door coupe SUV (Sportback)
- Layout: Rear-motor, rear-wheel-drive; Dual-motor, four-wheel-drive
- Platform: Premium Platform Electric (PPE)
- Related: Porsche Macan II; Audi A6 e-tron

Powertrain
- Electric motor: Asynchronous motor (front) + permanent magnet synchronous (rear)
- Power output: 215–315 kW (288–422 hp; 292–428 PS) (Q6); 360 kW (483 hp; 489 PS) (SQ6)
- Transmission: Single-speed automatic
- Battery: 83 kWh 10-Modules NMC811 CATL; 100 kWh 12-Modules NMC CATL
- Range: 600 km (373 mi) (WLTP)

Dimensions
- Wheelbase: 2,899 mm (114.1 in); 2,995 mm (117.9 in) (Q6L e-tron)
- Length: 4,771 mm (187.8 in); 4,884 mm (192.3 in) (Q6L e-tron)
- Width: 1,939 mm (76.3 in); 1,965 mm (77.4 in) (Q6L e-tron)
- Height: 1,648 mm (64.9 in); 1,694 mm (66.7 in) (Q6L e-tron); 1,656 mm (65.2 in) (Q6L Sportback e-tron)

The Audi Q6 e-tron is a battery electric compact luxury crossover SUV produced by German car manufacturer Audi, with production from an Audi plant in the city of Ingolstadt starting in November 2023. Like the Porsche Macan EV and the Audi A6 e-tron, the Q6 e-tron uses the PPE platform.

== Overview ==
The interior of the Q6 e-tron was revealed to the public on 4 September 2023 at the Munich Motor Show, with the exterior and full details was later revealed on 18 March 2024.

The Q6 e-tron is the first Audi to reverse Audi's controversial double-digit numbering system omitting the number designation. The 'Performance' suffix is used for the most powerful single-motor model.

For the exterior design, Sascha Hyde from Audi Exterior Design said that, "For the Audi Q6 e-tron, we wanted a perfect pure SUV with classic powerful Audi ‘Q’ proportions". The exterior has the classic Audi Singleframe grille which is closed, the first Audi to feature a split headlight design, Audi’s second-generation OLED digital light technology with 3D animation, the rear taillights can project arrows and warning triangles inside them to alert road users behind.

The interior features Audi's new Digital Stage panoramic display which houses the 11.9-inch digital instrument cluster and 14.5-inch central infotainment touchscreen (operated by an Android Automotive based system). The panel is intended to mimic the shape of Audi's Singleframe exterior grille. There is the option of a 10.9-inch infotainment display for the front passenger with an Active Privacy Mode to eliminate driver distraction, Augmented Reality Head Up Display, and an AI-based Audi Assistant, and a dynamic LED light strip which frames the windscreen.

The Q6 e-tron has a maximum boot space of 1,529 L (54.0 cu ft) when the rear seats folded, which can be folded separately in 40:20:40 format. It is available with a frunk storage compartment of 64 L (2.3 cu ft).

It is based on the Premium Platform Electric platform co-developed by Audi and Porsche, with 800‑volt technology and a maximum charging capacity of 270 kW as standard. There are charging ports on both sides (AC/DC on one side and the other side has only AC). Bank charging can be enabled if a charging station only works with 400‑volt technology, by automatically splitting the battery into half and charge at an equal voltage.

The coupe SUV model marketed as the Sportback was unveiled on 13 October 2024. The Sportback model features a sloped roofline reduces the overall vehicle height by 38 mm (1.5 in) and the drag coefficient reduced to 0.26 compared to the regular model.

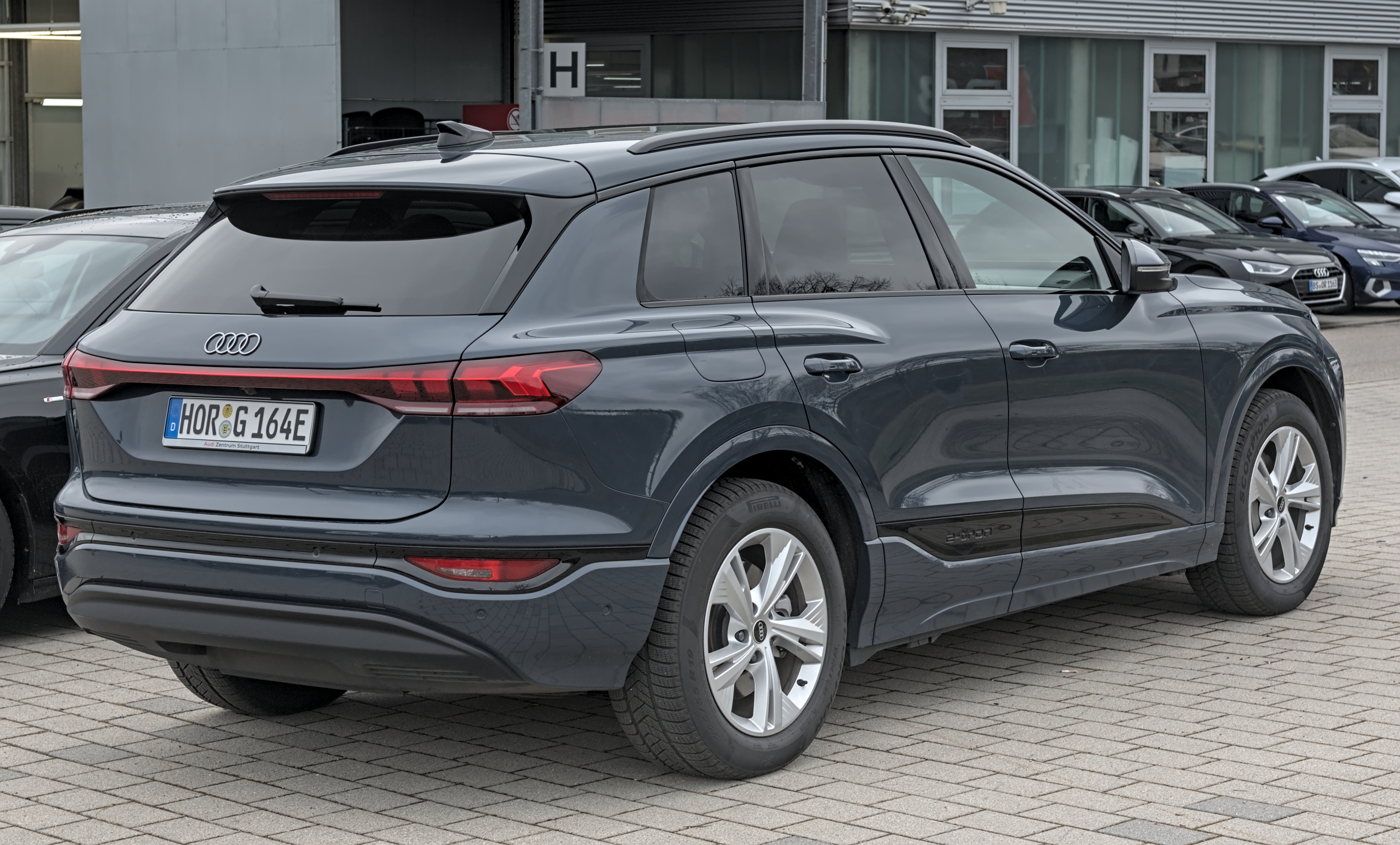
Q6 e-tron S-Line (rear view)

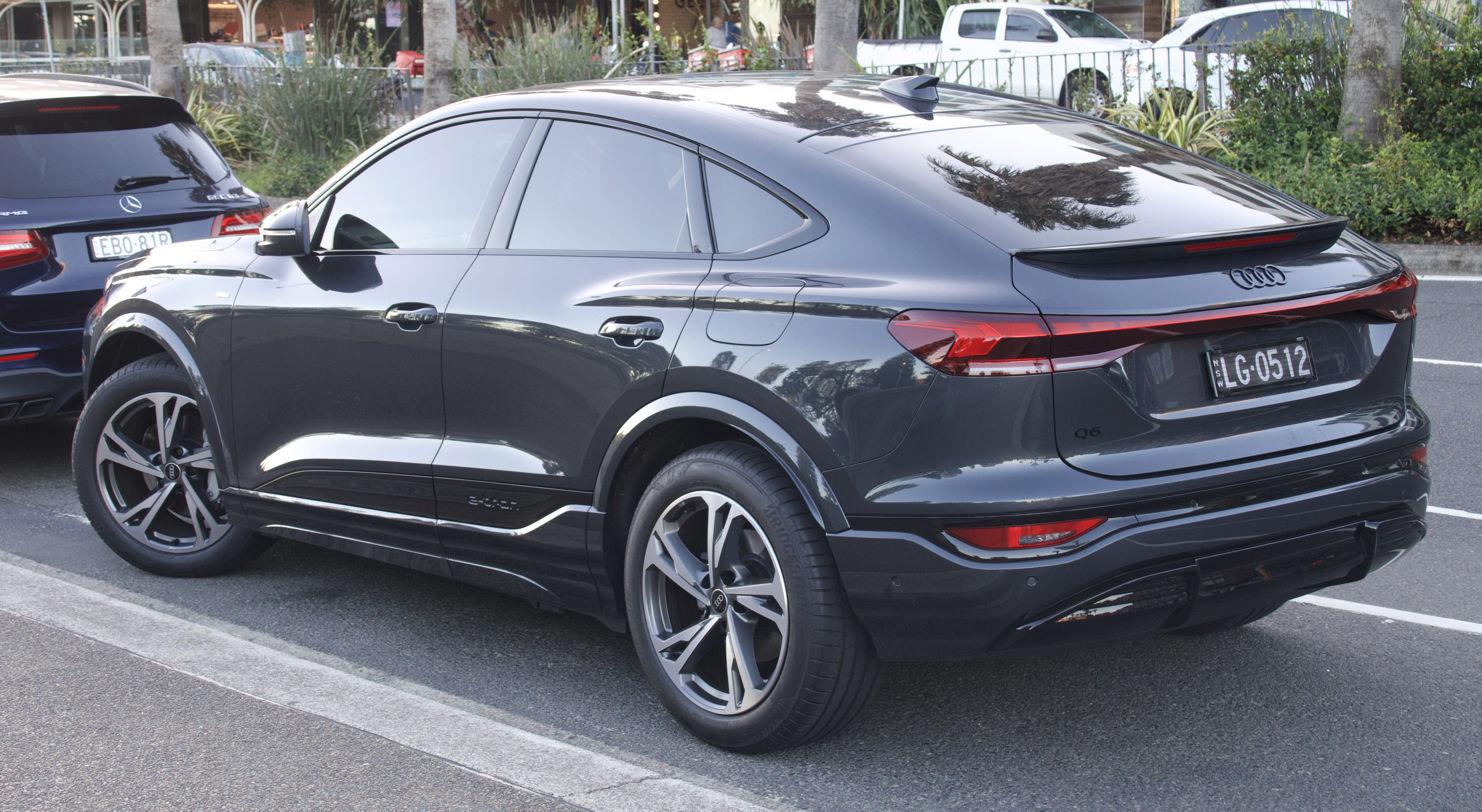
Q6 e-tron S-Line sportback

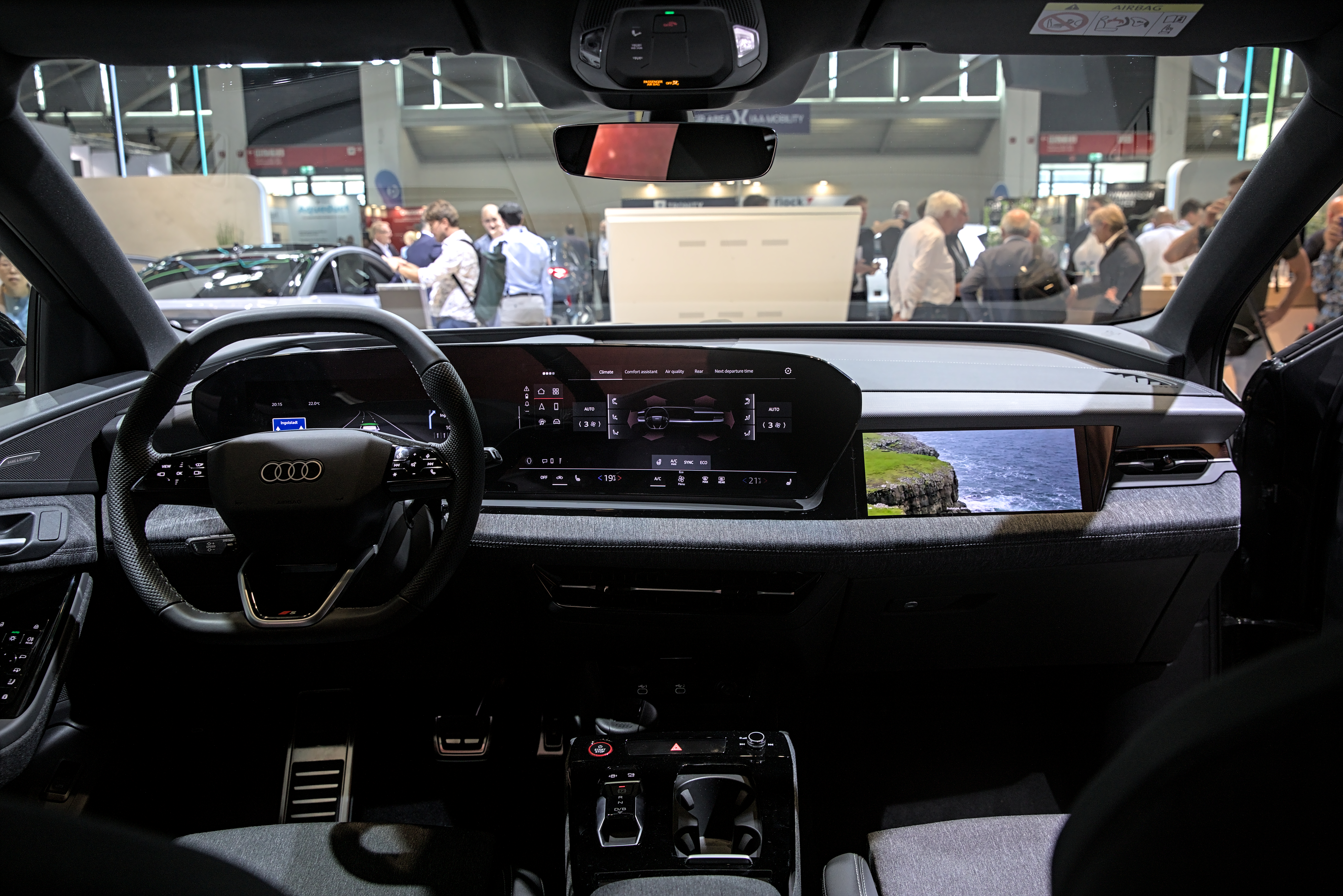
Interior

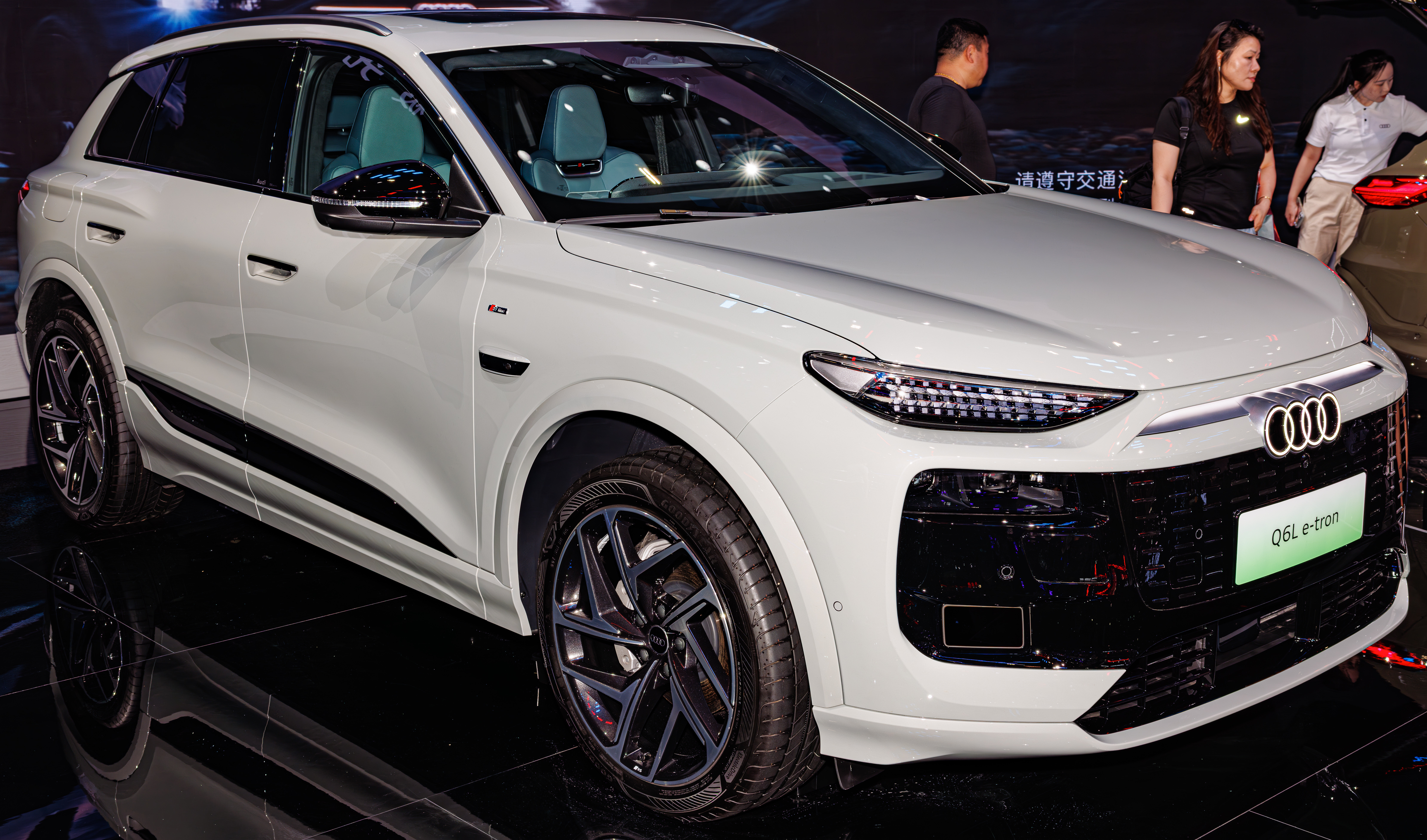
Q6L e-Tron

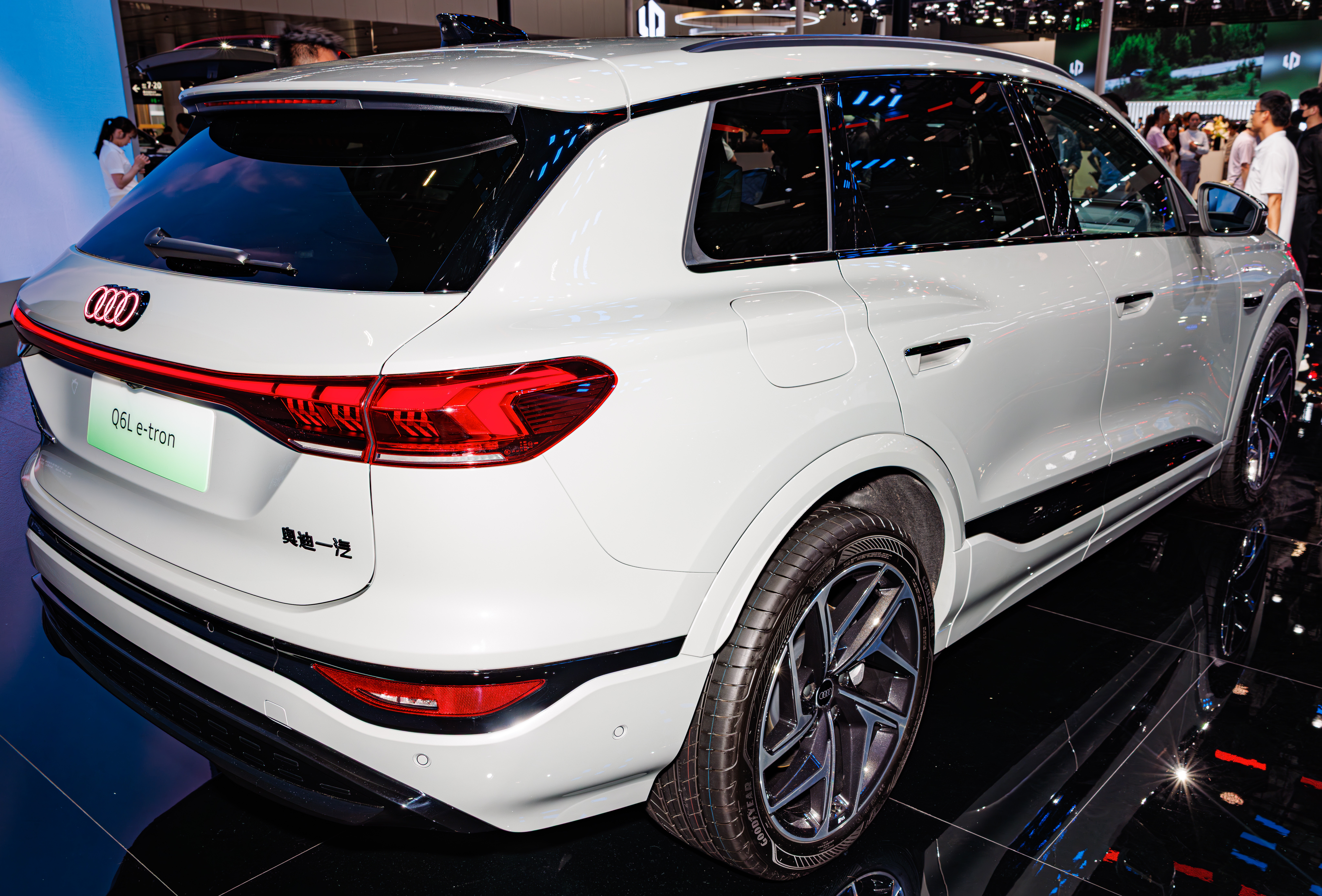
Q6L e-Tron

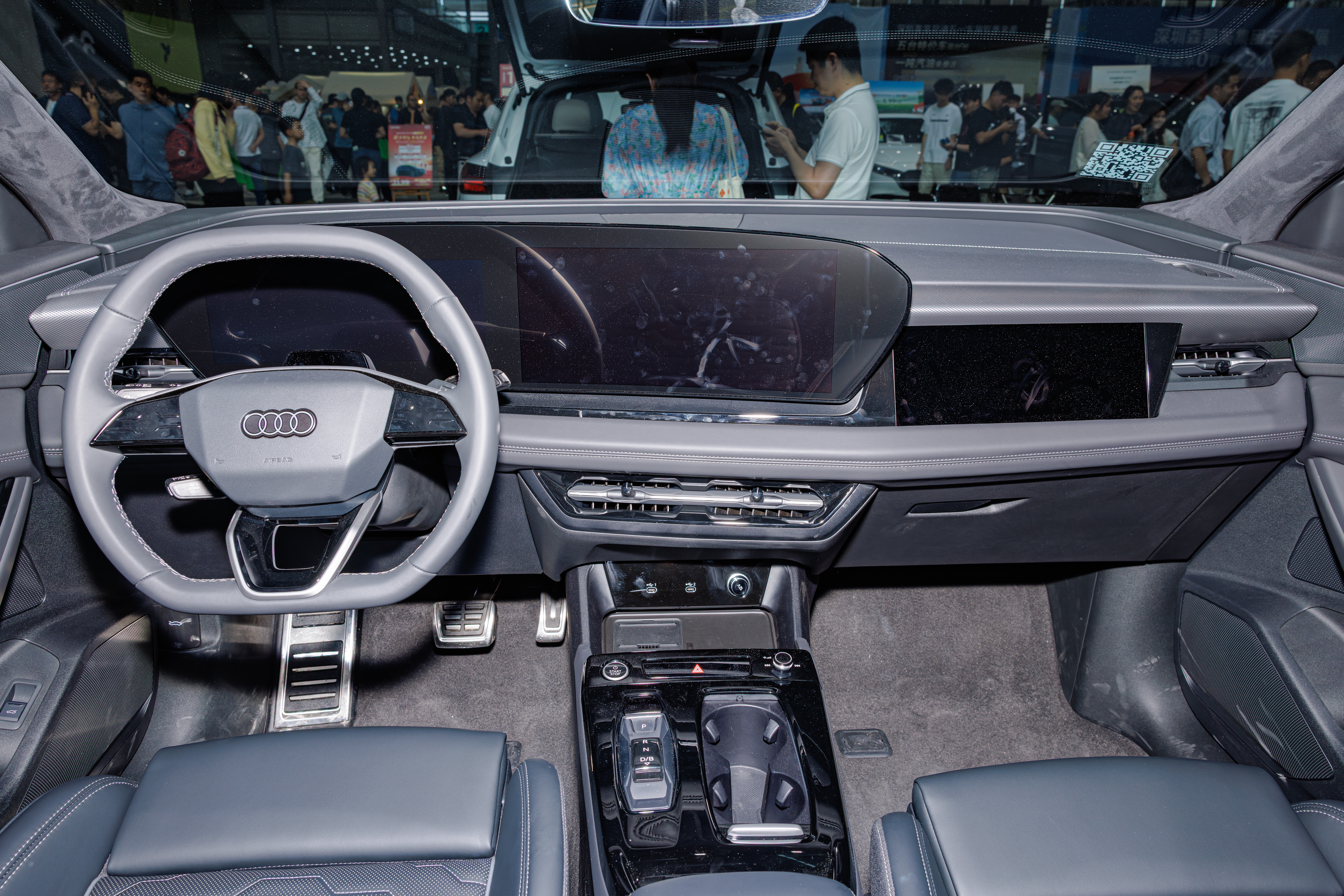
Q6L e-Tron Interior

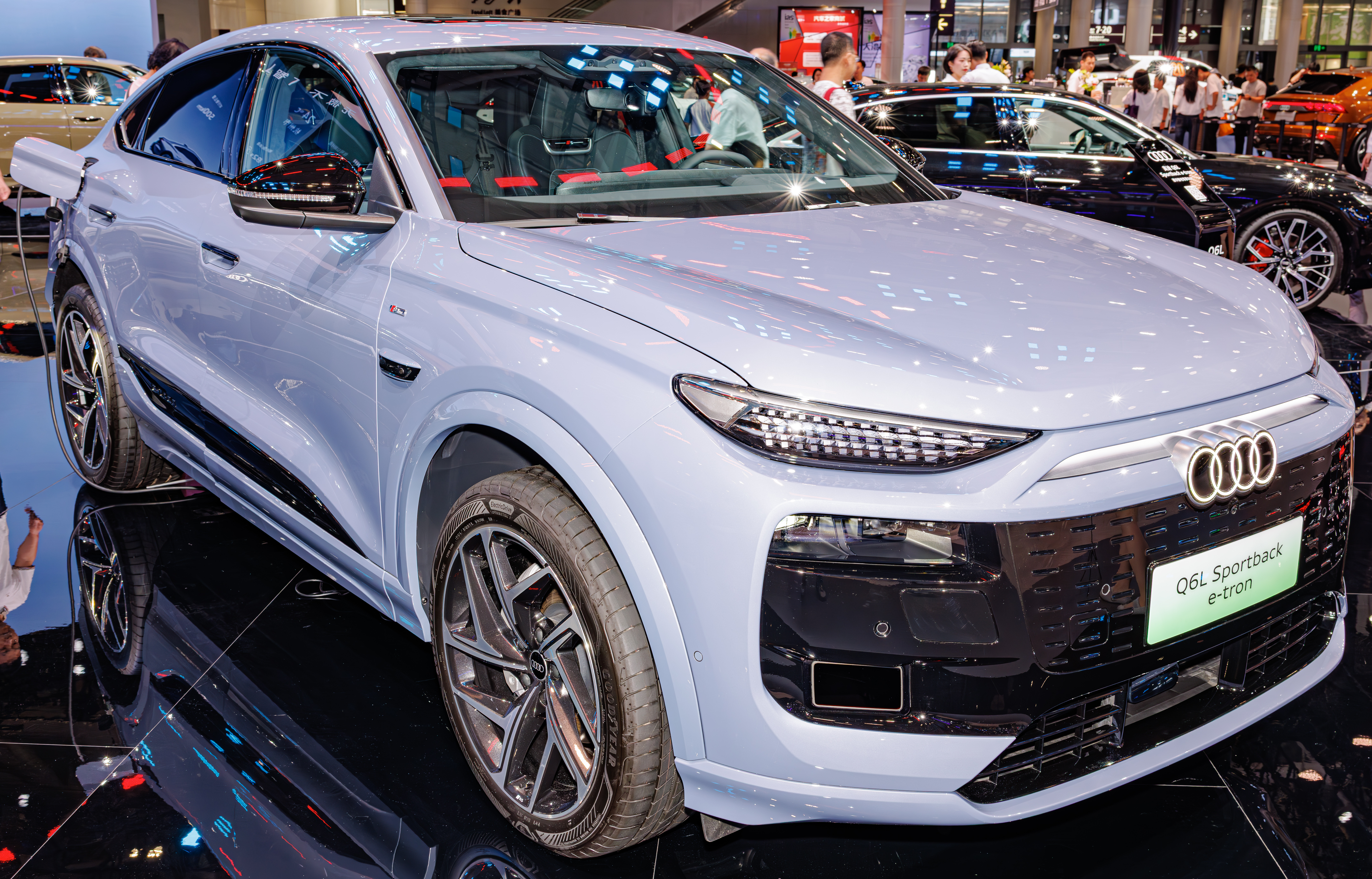
Q6L Sportback e-Tron

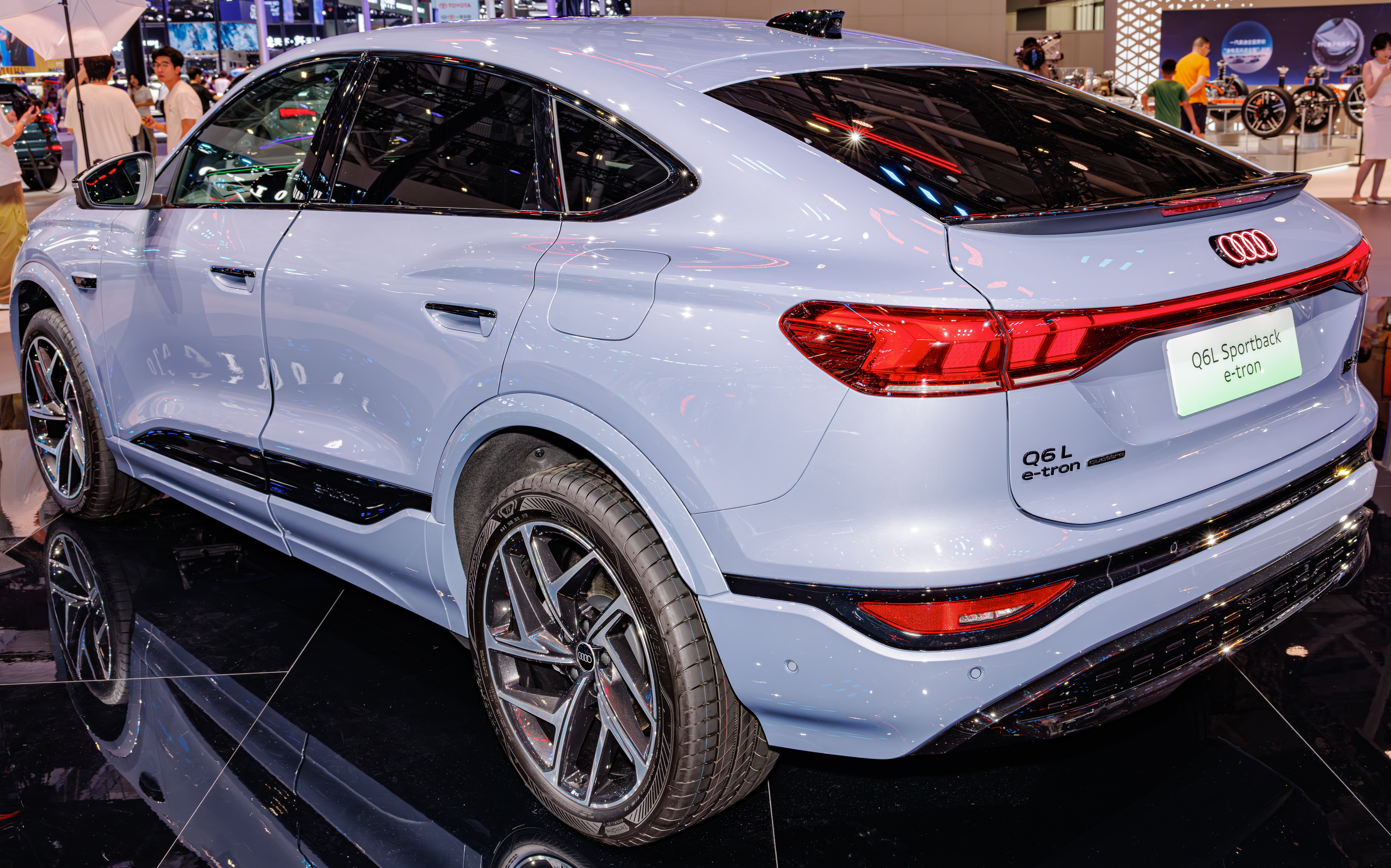
Q6L Sportback e-Tron

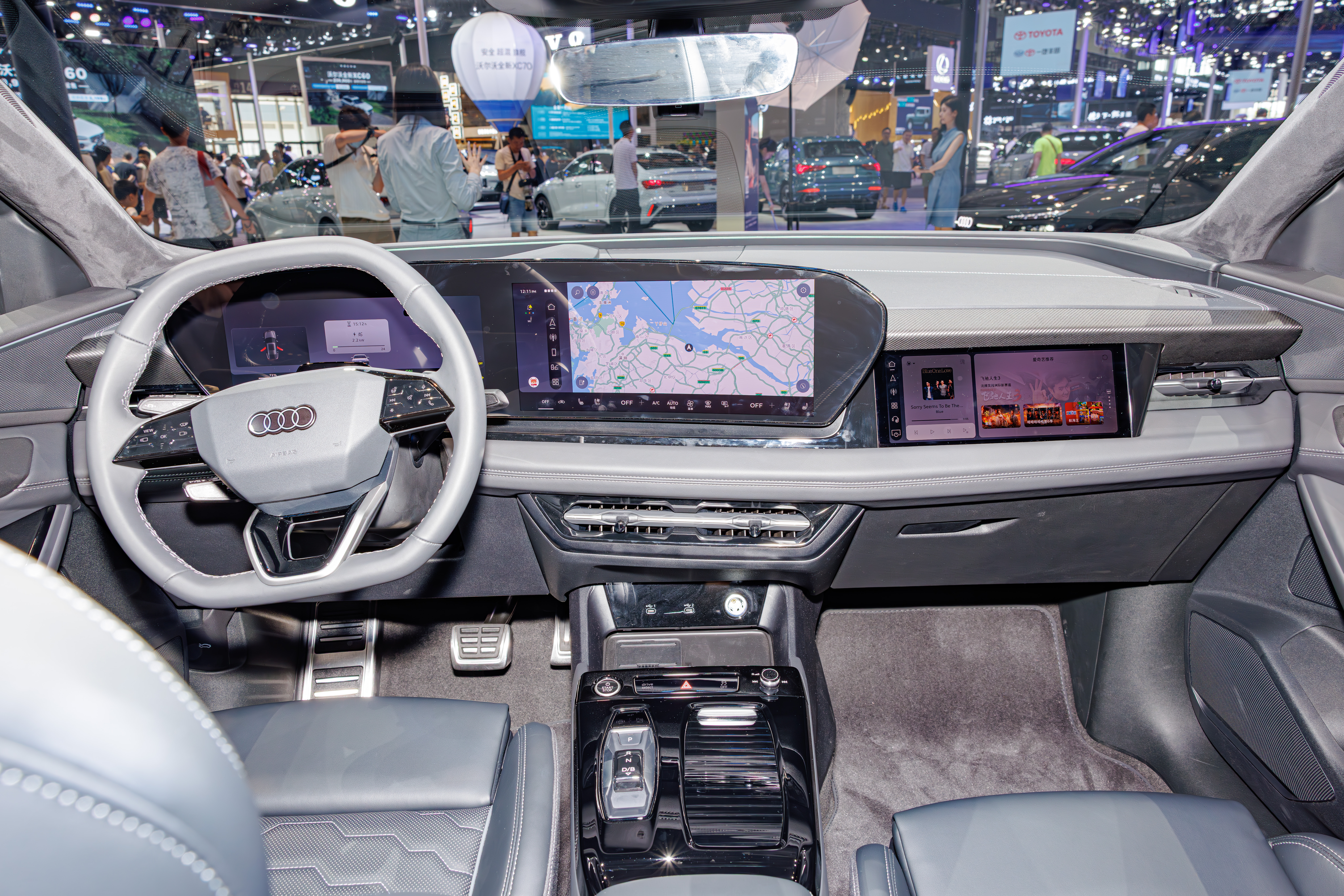
Q6L Sportback e-Tron Interior

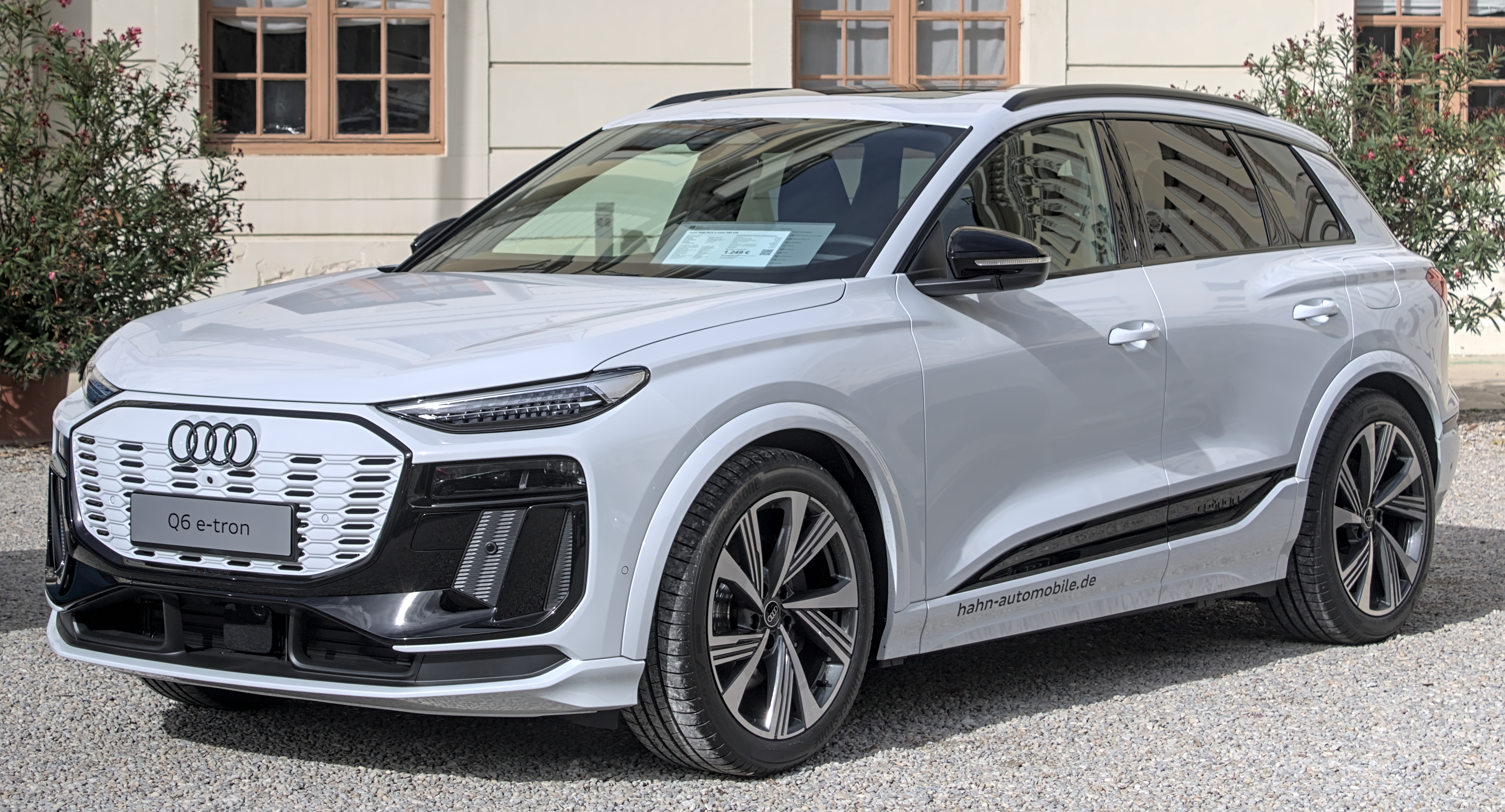
SQ6 e-tron

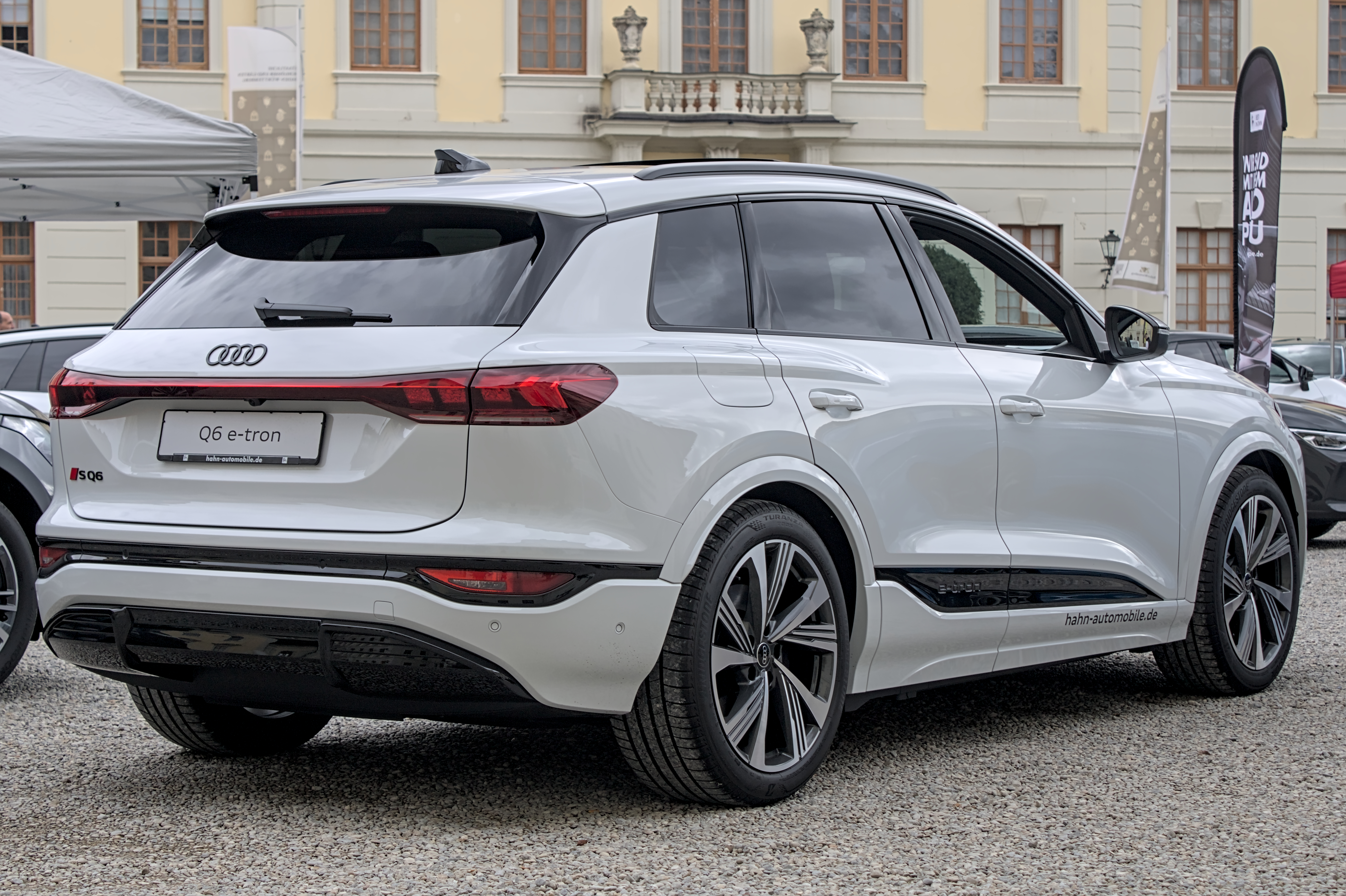
SQ6 e-tron

== Powertrain ==
Model	Battery		Power		Range (WLTP)	Peak DCFC	10–80% time	0–100 km/h (62 mph)	Top speed
Model	Type	Usable	Base	Peak	Range (WLTP)	Peak DCFC	10–80% time	0–100 km/h (62 mph)	Top speed
Base	83 kWh 10-module NMC811	75.8 kWh	185 kW (248 hp; 252 PS)	210 kW (282 hp; 286 PS)	533 km (331 mi)	225 kW	21 min	7.0 s	210 km/h (130 mph)
Performance	100 kWh 12-module NMC811	94.9 kWh	225 kW (302 hp; 306 PS)	240 kW (322 hp; 326 PS)	641 km (398 mi)	260 kW	22 min	6.6 s	210 km/h (130 mph)
quattro	100 kWh 12-module NMC811	94.9 kWh	285 kW (382 hp; 387 PS)		625 km (388 mi)	270 kW	21 min	5.9 s	210 km/h (130 mph)
SQ6	100 kWh 12-module NMC811	94.9 kWh	360 kW (483 hp; 489 PS)	380 kW (510 hp; 517 PS)	598 km (372 mi)	270 kW	21 min	4.3 s	230 km/h (143 mph)

== Safety ==
ANCAP test results Audi Q6 e-tron (2024, aligned with Euro NCAP)
Test	Points	%
Overall:	5 /5 stars	
Adult occupant:	36.57	91%
Child occupant:	42.87	87%
Pedestrian:	51.51	81%
Safety assist:	14.91	82%

Euro NCAP test results Audi Q6 e-tron quattro (LHD) (2024)
Test	Points	%
Overall:	5 /5 stars	
Adult occupant:	36.6	91%
Child occupant:	45.2	92%
Pedestrian:	51.5	81%
Safety assist:	14.5	80%

C-NCAP (2024) test results 2025 Q6L e-tron Long Range
Category		%
Overall:	5 /5 stars	86.7%
Occupant protection:		92.67%
Vulnerable road users:		76.04%
Active safety:		84.14%

== Sales ==
Year	China		
Year	Q6L	Sportback	Total
2025	3,289	384	3,673
