= Cariad SE =

German automotive software company

- Formerly: Volkswagen Car.SW Org. Wolfsburg AG
- Type: Subsidiary (Societas Europaea)
- Industry: Software
- Founded: 2020
- Headquarters: Wolfsburg, Germany
- Key people: Peter Bosch (CEO)
- Products: Vehicle software, driver-assistance systems, infotainment and connected services
- Parent: Volkswagen Group
- Website: cariad.technology

Cariad SE (stylised as CARIAD) is the Volkswagen Group’s automotive software subsidiary. Based in Wolfsburg, Germany, it was established in 2020 under the name Car.Software Organisation. It develops software for the group’s cars, from driver assistance and infotainment to vehicle controls and online services.

Volkswagen brought together software development from its brands in Cariad. After missed deadlines and financial losses, the group changed Cariad’s management and organisation and relied more on outside technology partners.

== History ==
Originally called the Car.Software Organisation, the company was founded in 2020. It adopted the name Cariad in March 2021 and changed its legal form to a SE. Cariad takes its name from “Car, I Am Digital”. Early projects included software for Volkswagen’s MEB platform and the PPE platform used by Audi and Porsche. Cariad was also developing E³ 2.0, which was intended to provide a shared software and electronics architecture for the group’s brands.

=== Development delays and reorganisation ===
In June 2022, Handelsblatt reported that the E³ 1.2 platform, intended as an intermediate step towards E³ 2.0, was overdue. In May 2023, Volkswagen replaced most of Cariad’s executive board. Peter Bosch, previously responsible for manufacturing at Bentley, succeeded Dirk Hilgenberg as chief executive on 1 June. Volkswagen also sought better cooperation between Cariad and its brands and greater involvement from outside partners.

Volkswagen and Rivian launched a joint venture in November 2024 to develop software and electrical architectures for future electric vehicles. Volkswagen agreed to invest up to US$5.8 billion in Rivian and the venture by 2027. The venture took over responsibility for the planned common vehicle software architecture. Cariad continued its other projects, including automated-driving software.

In March 2025, Reuters reported plans to cut approximately 1,600 jobs. Volkswagen said the cuts were part of a restructuring programme agreed in 2023. NDR reported another round of cuts in October 2026: about 1,000 jobs and €6.1 billion in planned investment for 2027–2031. Cariad said it was discussing changes to staffing and the organisation with employee representatives, without giving figures.

In October 2026, Volkswagen outlined plans for OneTeam, an Audi-led unit combining driver-assistance teams from Cariad and the group’s brands. It was due to begin work in November, led by Cariad’s Manuel Birke.

== Vehicle platforms and infotainment ==
Its software platforms include E³ 1.1 for Volkswagen’s ID. range and E³ 1.2 for Audi and Porsche. The Audi Q3 was the first model to use Cariad’s One.Connected Infotainment system, introduced in 2025.

Cariad uses Android Automotive as a basis for its in-car app system. The Volkswagen Group’s app store works with Harman’s Ignite Store to make third-party applications available through the infotainment system. It also develops voice assistants, including the technology announced for Porsche’s Voice Pilot in the Macan and Cayenne Electric.

== Driver assistance ==
Volkswagen and Cariad jointly developed the Volkswagen ID.7’s Travel Assist with swarm data. It keeps the car in its lane, maintains a set speed and distance from the vehicle ahead. It can also assist with lane changes on motorways. Earlier versions of Travel Assist used mapping data from Mobileye’s Road Experience Management system.

Bosch and Cariad announced their Automated Driving Alliance in January 2022. They initially planned both Level 2 assistance and a Level 3 system for motorway driving. The collaboration ended in July 2026 with a Level 2 system and the planned work on Level 3 was cancelled. Both companies could continue using and developing the software and data produced during the partnership.

Under a separate agreement announced in 2024, Volkswagen Group expanded its partnership with Mobileye to develop driver-assistance functions for premium-brand vehicles. In October 2026, Mobileye said that the SuperVision programme led by Porsche and the Chauffeur programme led by Audi remained in development, with vehicle launches planned for 2027–2028.

== Operations ==
Cariad operates development sites in Germany and has subsidiaries in China and North America. It owns 51% of the Czech engineering company Digiteq Automotive, with Škoda Auto holding the remaining 49%. Cariad and Elektrobit also jointly own the software company e.solutions.

The Chinese subsidiary CARIZON was established in 2022. It develops driver-assistance systems with Horizon Robotics through their joint venture. Infotainment and connectivity software is developed with ThunderSoft through CARThunder. Cariad China also works with XPeng and Volkswagen Group China Technology Company on the China Electronic Architecture.

In 2026, CARIZON announced the rollout of Hyper Sense 8 in Chinese-market vehicles. The system supports driving on city streets and motorways, but the driver must remain attentive and ready to take over.

== Data security ==
Der Spiegel reported in December 2024 that a security flaw at Cariad had exposed data from about 800,000 electric cars made by Volkswagen Group brands. The exposed data included precise location records for around 460,000 of them. The Chaos Computer Club had alerted Cariad to the security flaw on 26 November. Volkswagen said it had fixed the problem and that passwords and payment details were not affected.
