= Volkswagen Group Premium Platform Electric =

Modular electric car platform

Premium Platform Electric
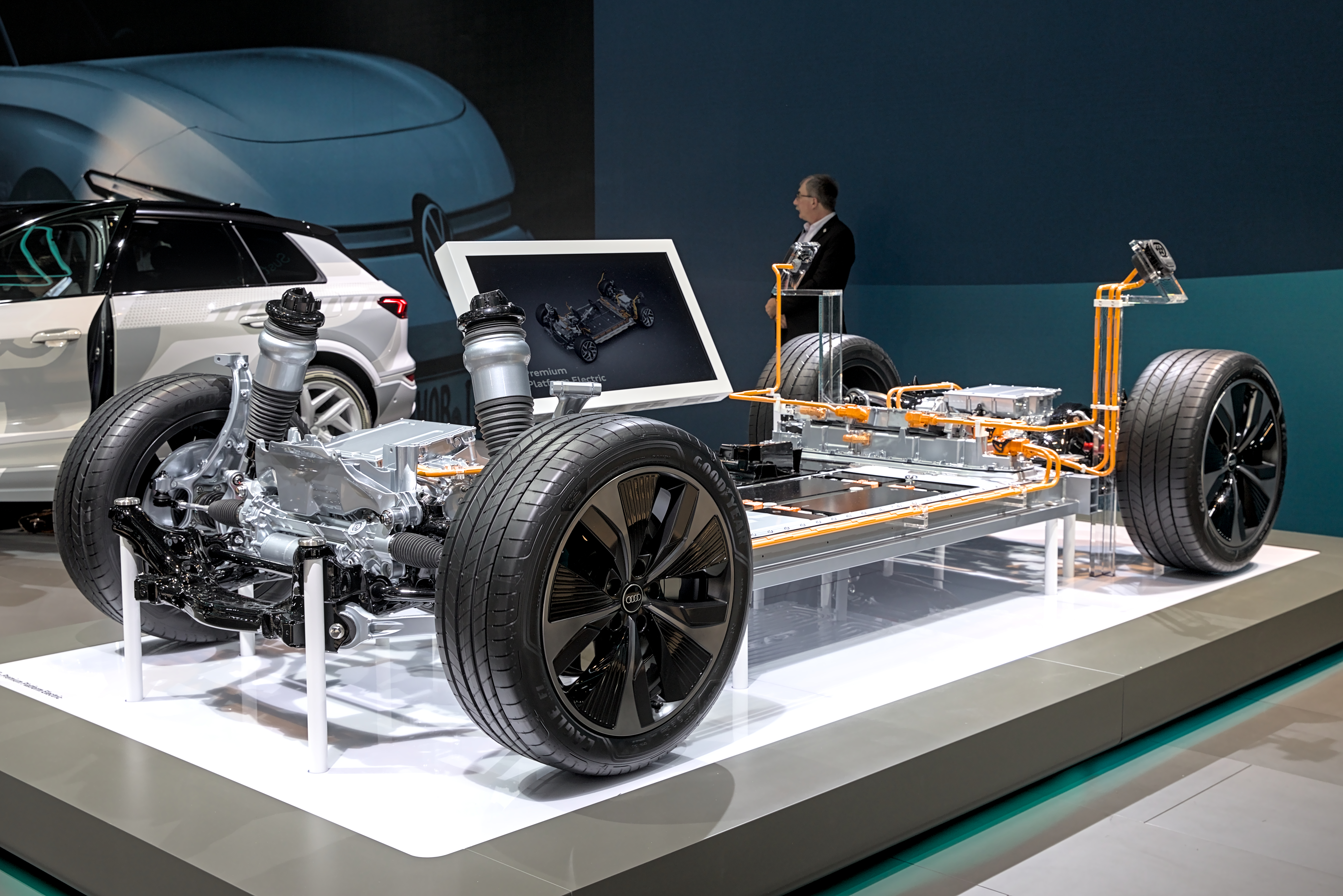
- Premium Platform Electric at the 2023 Munich Motor Show

Overview
- Manufacturer: Audi and Porsche
- Parent company: Volkswagen Group
- Production: 2024–present

Body and chassis
- Layout: Rear-motor, rear-wheel-drive; Dual-motor, all-wheel-drive
- Related: MEB platform

Premium Platform Electric (PPE) is a modular car platform for electric cars developed by Volkswagen Group brands Audi and Porsche. The platform is meant for larger electric vehicles which are not suitable for the MEB platform.

Details of the platform were first revealed in 2019, with Audi noting that it would have 60% commonality with the MLB Evo platform. The first car officially announced as using the PPE platform was the Audi A6 e-tron.

== Details ==
Cars built on the platform have up to a 700 km WLTP range, with an 800V electrical architecture that allows DC fast charging at up to 270kW. In November 2022, it was revealed that the architecture allowed rear or four-wheel drive, with power up to 450kW. The batteries run at 800V, but can split into 2 parallel 400V packs for faster charging.

== Models ==
- Audi A6 e-tron (2024–present)
  - Audi A6 Avant e-tron (2024–present)
- Audi Q6 e-tron (2024–present)
  - Audi Q6 Sportback e-tron (2024–present)
- Porsche Macan Electric (2024–present)
- Porsche Cayenne Electric (2026–present)
  - Porsche Cayenne Coupé Electric (2026–present)
- Bentley Torcal (2026–present)
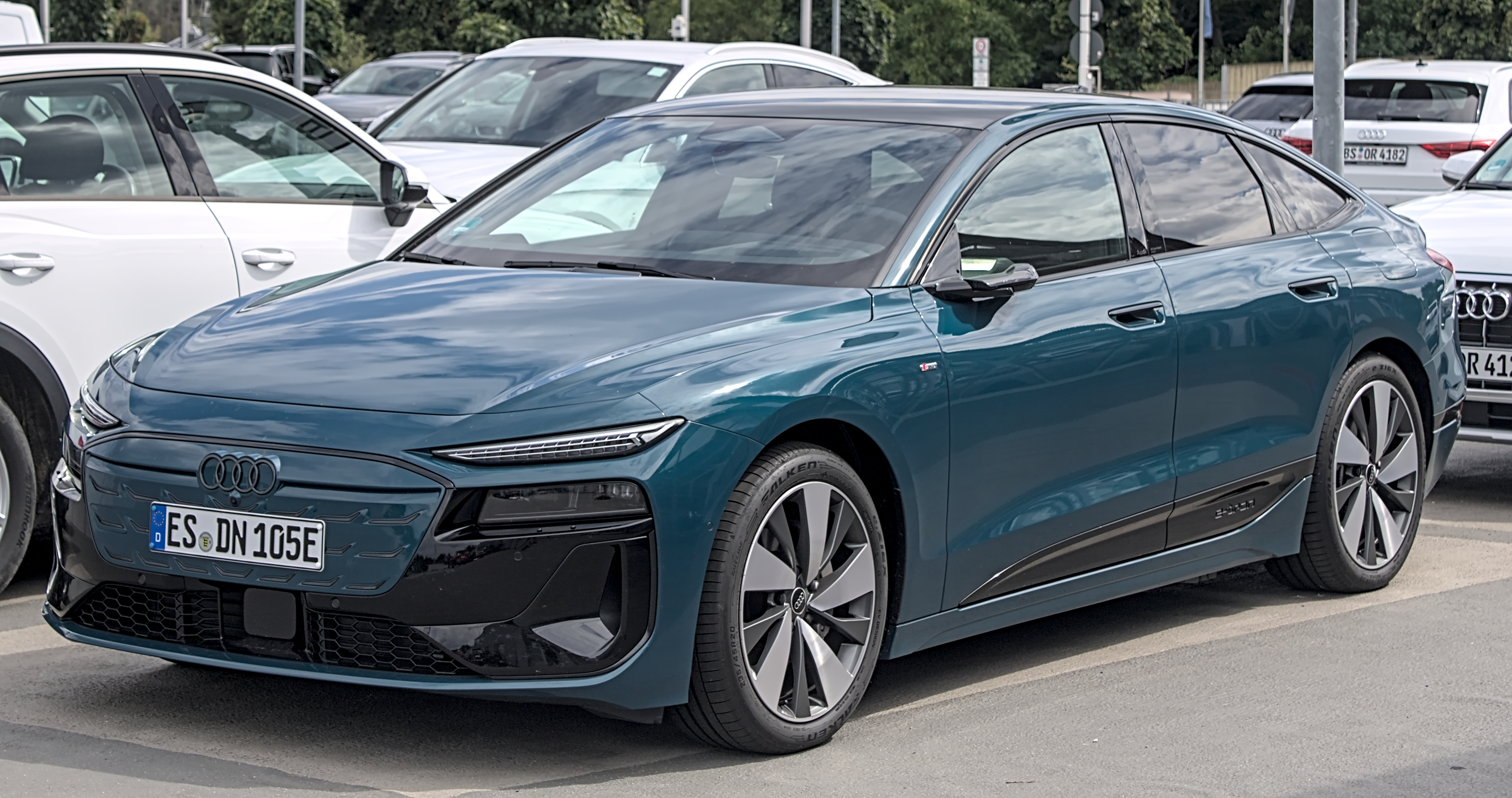
Audi A6 e-tron

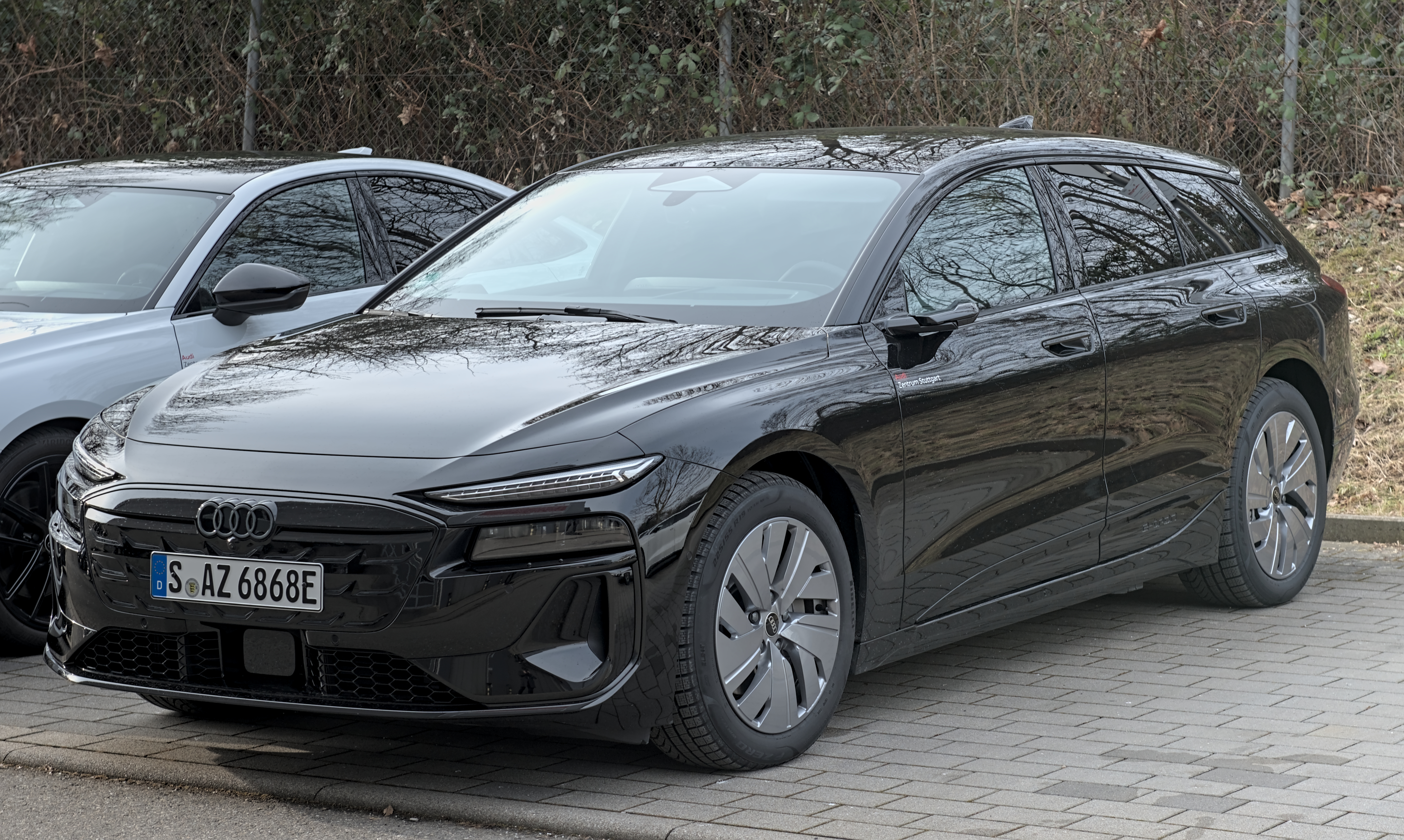
Audi A6 Avant e-tron

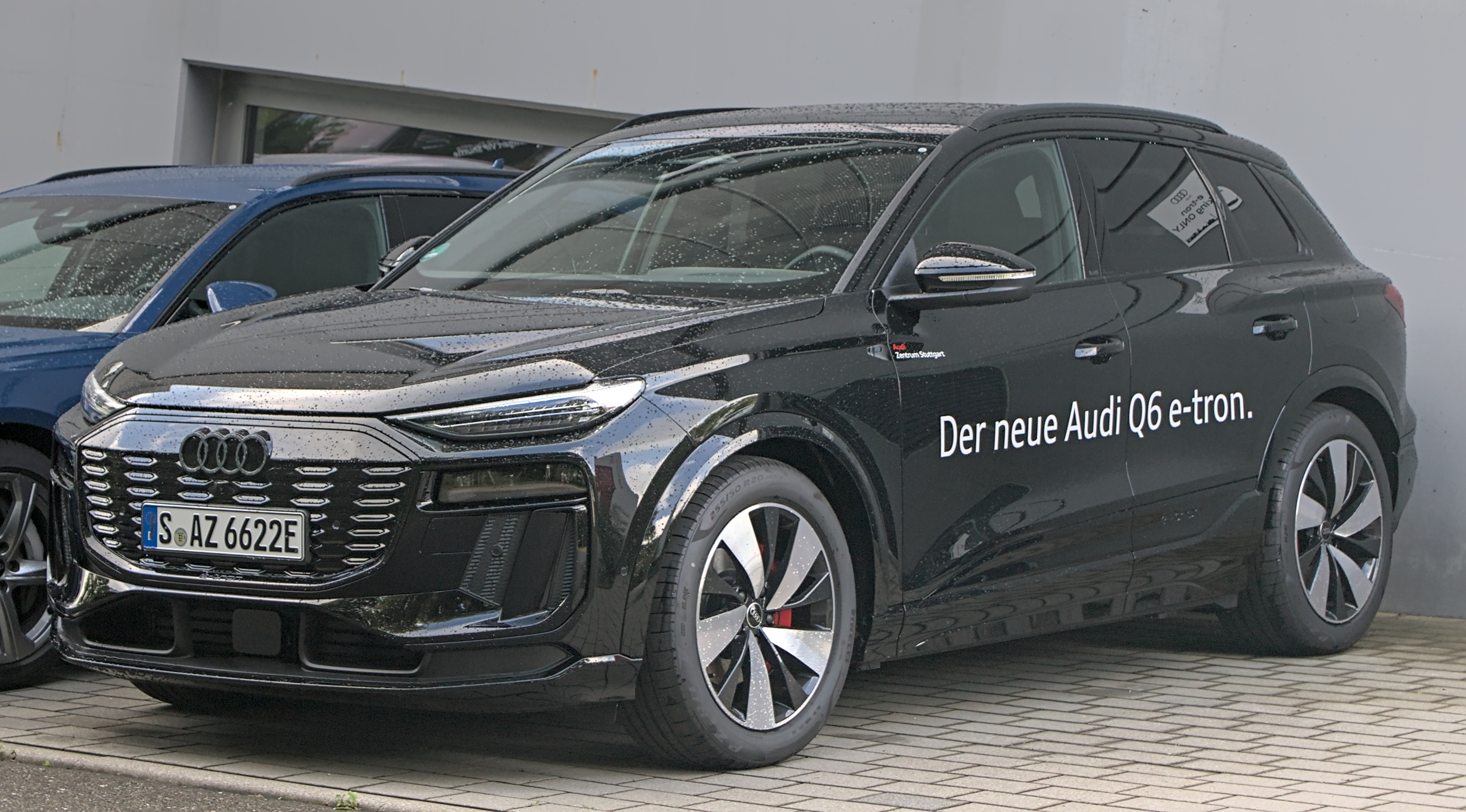
Audi Q6 e-tron

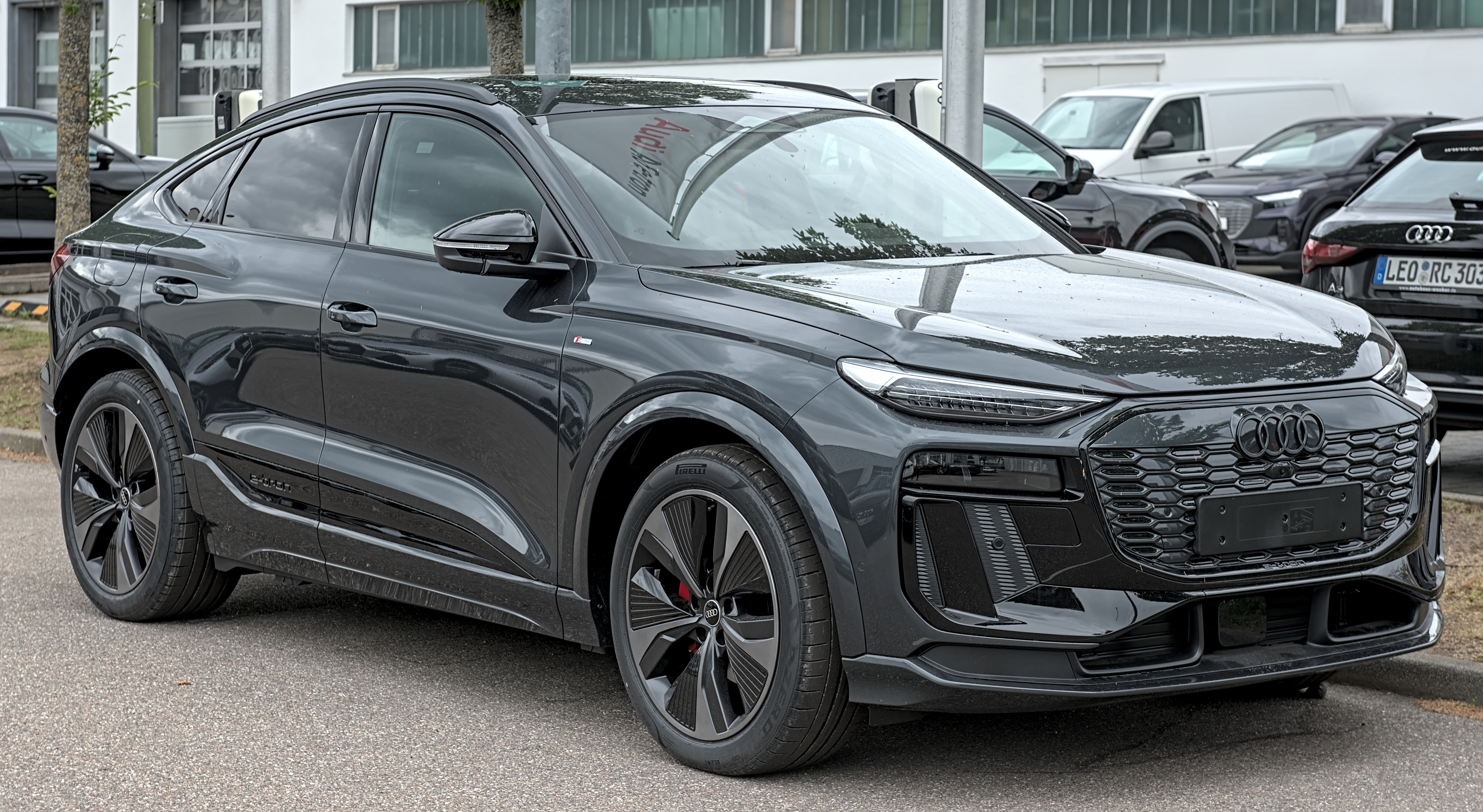
Audi Q6 e-tron Sportback

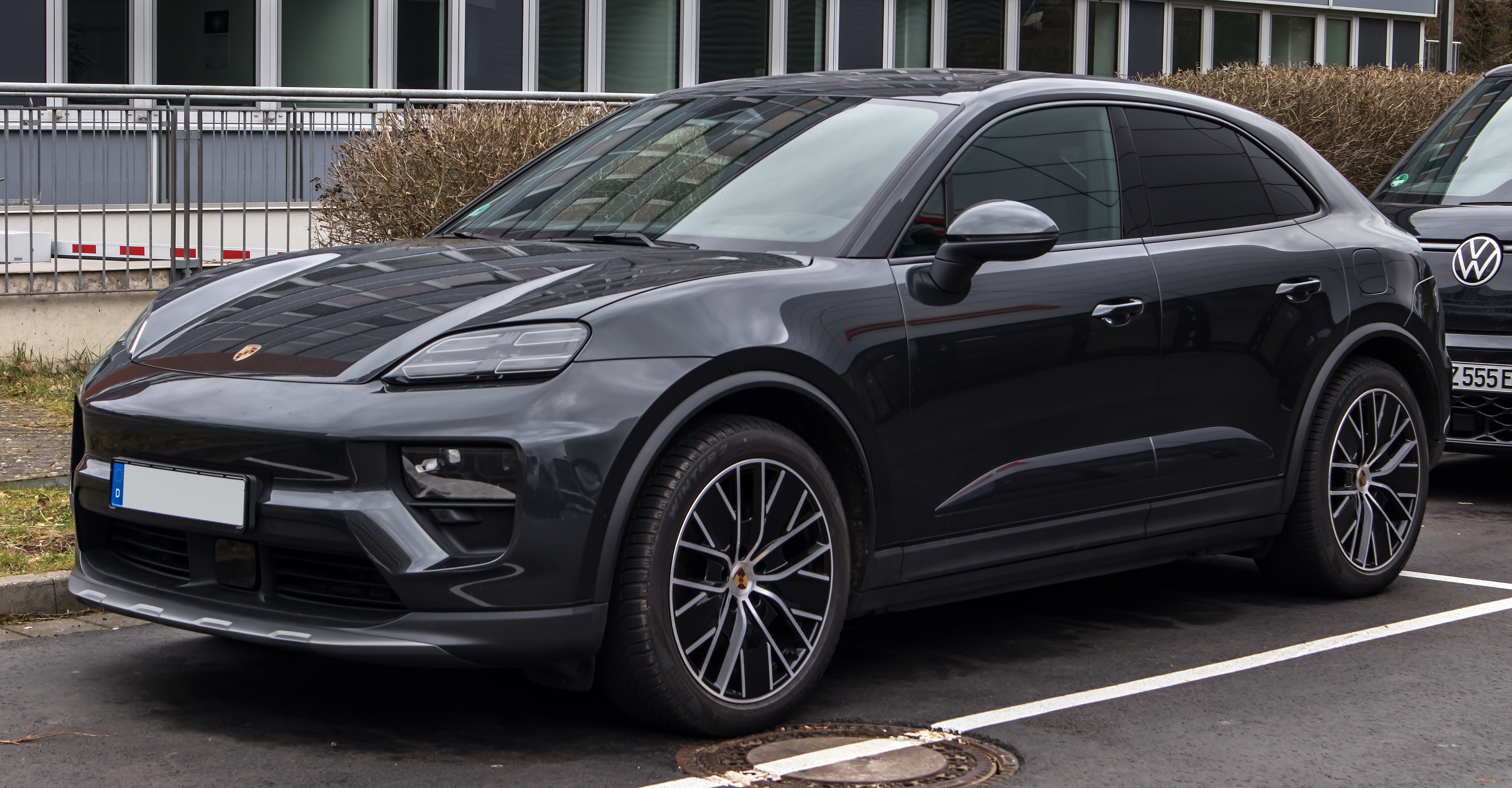
Porsche Macan Electric

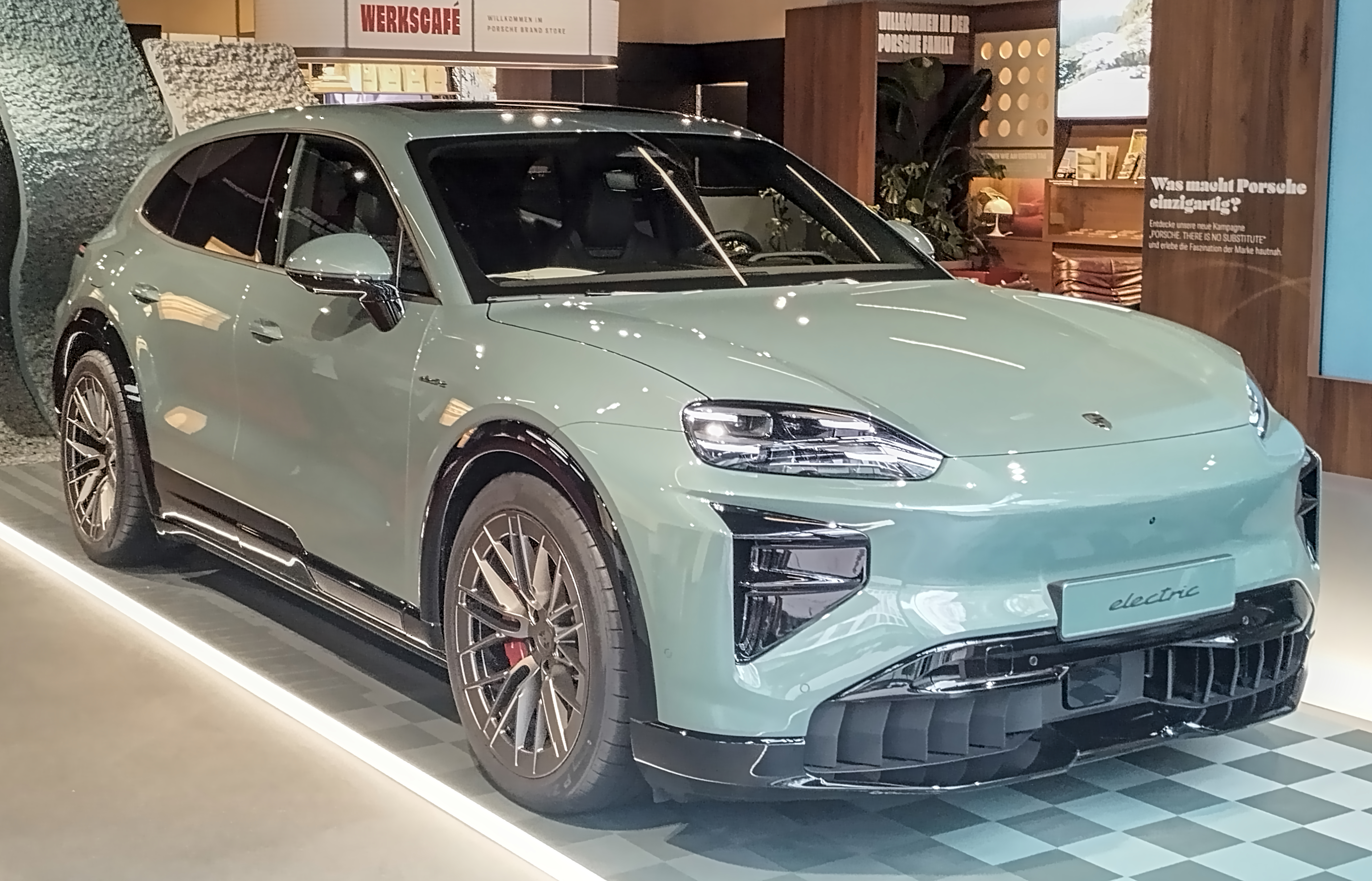
Porsche Cayenne Electric

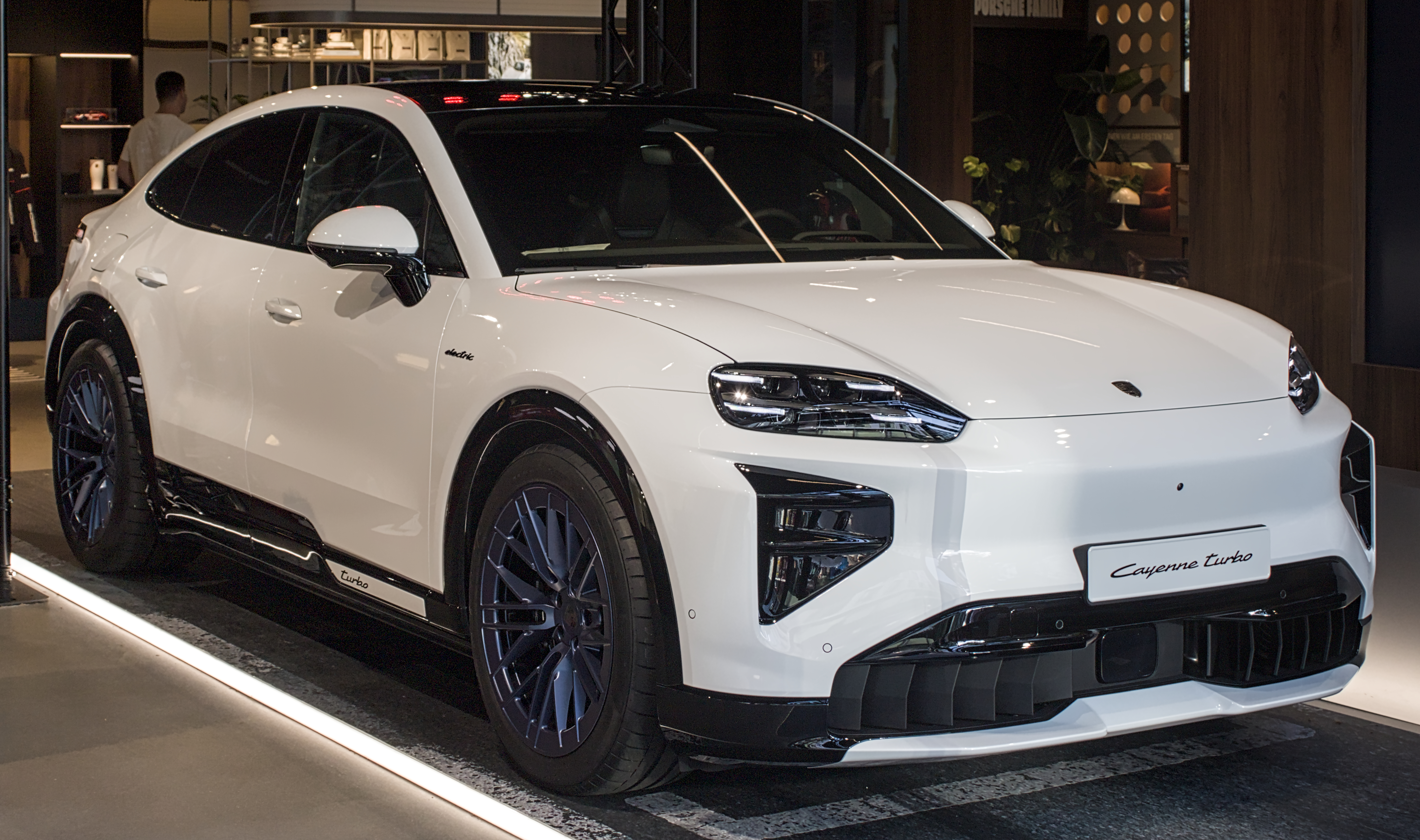
Porsche Cayenne Coupé Electric

Bentley Torcal

== See also ==
- Volkswagen Group Premium Platform Combustion
- Volkswagen Group MEB platform
- Volkswagen Group Scalable Systems Platform
- List of Volkswagen Group platforms
