= List of Volkswagen Group platforms =

The German automotive concern, Volkswagen Group has, since the 1970s, developed a series of shared automobile platforms for their motor vehicles.

Originally, these were identified using a simple alphanumeric system. The first letter prefix indicates the car classification or physical size (A, B, C or D - for 'traditional' cars); followed by a number to enumerate different generations of the same class. However, more recent platforms have formally departed from this convention, although the older alphanumeric codes continue to be used informally.

These platforms may be used by one or more marques of the Group.

== Platform codes ==
=== Original system ===
Volkswagen Group alphanumeric platforms
platform name	used for	notable examples	comments
A00	city cars	Volkswagen Lupo, SEAT Arosa	This platform never developed any subsequent evolutions or generations.
A0 series	supermini cars	Audi 50, Volkswagen Polo, SEAT Ibiza, SEAT Córdoba, Škoda Fabia	As of 2014, in its sixth generation.
A series	small family cars / compact cars	Audi A3, Audi Q3, Audi TT, VW Golf, VW Jetta, VW Eos, VW Tiguan, VW Touran, VW Scirocco, SEAT León, SEAT Toledo, SEAT Altea, Škoda Octavia	The most prolific platform, six generations.
B series	mid-size cars	Audi 4000, Audi 80, Audi 90, Audi A4, Volkswagen Passat, SEAT Exeo, Škoda Superb	Another prolific platform, now informally in its ninth generation.
C series	extended mid-size executive cars	Audi 5000, Audi 100/200, Audi A6, Audi A6 allroad quattro	Eight generations to date.
D series	full-size luxury cars	Audi V8, Audi A8, Bentley Continental GT, Volkswagen Phaeton	Six variants from five generations. Confusingly, the D series includes models using both conventional steel monocoque construction, or the very different aluminium Audi Space Frame construction.
T series	vans	Volkswagen Transporter range	the early generations were retroactively named, the T1 is the oldest "platform", based on the original Type 1 Volkswagen Beetle.

Note that some designations in common use are ambiguous; i.e. in some cases the same platform designation is used for different models that do not share a common platform. An example would be the B6 designation - this is used to identify the 2001-2005 Audi A4 (and the related Audi S4), which uses a longitudinal engine and transmission placement with a pressed steel front subframe; however it is also used to identify the sixth-generation Volkswagen Passat, but this uses a transverse engine and transmission placement with a very different cast aluminium alloy front subframe.

=== Joint-venture platforms ===
Platforms developed by Volkswagen Group as joint ventures with other manufacturers have designations which do not conform to the above scheme. These include:

Volkswagen Group joint-venture platforms
platform name	used for	notable examples	comments
B-VX62	multi-purpose vehicles (MPVs)	Volkswagen Sharan (7M), SEAT Alhambra (7M), Ford Galaxy	Joint-venture with Ford Motor Company.
LT/T1N series	light commercial vehicles	Volkswagen LT range, Mercedes-Benz Sprinter	Second and third generations are a joint-venture with Daimler AG.

=== PL/PQ platforms ===
Volkswagen Group has previously introduced an alphanumeric nomenclature for car platforms. The platform code is composed as follows:

- A letter, P, indicating a passenger car platform
- A letter indicating the configuration of the engine:
  - Q indicates a transverse engine (Quer in German)
  - L indicates a longitudinal engine (Längs in German)
- A digit indicating the platform size or class
- A digit indicating the generation or evolution

An additional + suffix indicates a long-wheelbase variant.

Volkswagen Group PL/PQ platforms
platform code	used for	notable examples
PQ12 (NSF)	ultra-compact city cars	Volkswagen Up, SEAT Mii, Škoda Citigo
PQ24	supermini cars	Volkswagen Polo (9N), Volkswagen Gol MK5 - Third Gen.(2008–present, PQ24/25 hybrid) SEAT Ibiza (6L), SEAT Córdoba (6L), Škoda Fabia (6Y), Škoda Fabia (5J), Škoda Roomster
PQ25	supermini cars	Volkswagen Polo (6R), SEAT Ibiza (6J), Audi A1
PQ26	supermini cars	Volkswagen Polo (6C), SEAT Ibiza (6P), Skoda Fabia (6V)
PQ34	small family cars / compact cars	Audi A3 (8L), Volkswagen Golf Mk4 (1J), Volkswagen Bora/Jetta (1J), SEAT León (1M), SEAT Toledo (1M), Škoda Octavia (1U)
PQ35	small family cars / compact cars	Audi A3 (8P), Audi Q3 (8U), Volkswagen Golf Mk5 (1K), Volkswagen Jetta Mk5 (1K), Volkswagen Golf Mk6 (5K), Volkswagen Eos, Volkswagen Scirocco Mk3, Volkswagen Tiguan, SEAT León (1P), SEAT Toledo (1P), SEAT Altea, Škoda Octavia (1Z), Škoda Yeti
PL45	mid-size cars	Audi A4 (8D), Volkswagen Passat (3B), Volkswagen Passat GP Lingyu
PL45+	mid-size cars	Volkswagen Passat Lingyu, Škoda Superb (3U)
PQ46	mid-size cars	Volkswagen Passat (3C), Volkswagen Sharan (7M), Škoda Superb (3T)
PL46	mid-size cars	Audi A4 (8E B6)
PQ47	mid-size cars	Volkswagen CC (7N B7)
PL47	mid-size cars	Audi A4 (8E B7), SEAT Exeo
PL62	full-size luxury cars	Audi A8, Bentley Continental Flying Spur, Bentley Continental GT/GTC, Volkswagen Phaeton
PL64	full-size luxury cars	Audi A8, Bentley Continental GT, Volkswagen Phaeton
PL71	sport utility vehicles (SUVs)	Audi Q7, Porsche Cayenne, Volkswagen Touareg
PL72	sport utility vehicles (SUVs)	Porsche Cayenne, Volkswagen Touareg (7P)

== Modular component systems ==
In 2007, Volkswagen Group introduced a more flexible "modular component system" architecture on which to base future platforms. Four such component systems were planned: However, models developed from these modular component systems may also be identified by PL/PQ platform designations.

- MQB: Modularer Querbaukasten, or "modular transverse component system", highly scalable platform for vehicles with a transverse-mounted combustion engine and front-wheel or all-wheel drive, developed by Volkswagen.
- MLB: Modularer Längsbaukasten, or "modular longitudinal component system", predecessor of the PPC for vehicles with a longitudinally installed combustion engine and front or all-wheel drive in the mid and luxury class, developed by Audi.
- PPC: Premium Platform Combustion, successor to the MLB for vehicles with a longitudinally installed hybridised combustion engine and front or all-wheel drive in the mid and luxury class, developed by Audi.
- MSB: Modularer Standardantriebsbaukasten, or "modular standard drive train system", for vehicles with longitudinally mounted front engine and rear-wheel or all-wheel drive, developed by Porsche.
- MMB: Modularer Mittelbaukasten, for mid-engined or rear-engined sports cars. Currently used by the Porsche 992 911 and the Porsche 982 718.
- MSS: Modulare Aufhängungslösung, or "Modular Sports System", used for the Audi R8 and the Lamborghini Huracán.
- MNB: Modulare Nutzfahrzeugbaukasten, for light commercial vehicles (VW Crafter/MAN TGE).

== Software platforms ==
- GENIVI Linux
- Bosch Software Components
- MIB - Modular Infotainment Platform
  - MIB 2
  - MIB 3 - BlackBerry QNX
- E³ 1.1 (End-to-End 1.1)
  - Volkswagen Automotive Cloud
- Platform 1.2
- E³ 2.0 architecture
  - Unified Platform 2.0

== Electric car platforms ==
- CMP: Compact Main Platform or China Main Platform is developed in China specifically for locally manufactured, lower-cost battery electric vehicles and plug-in hybrids.
- CSP: China Scalable Platform is developed in China specifically for locally manufactured, full-size and flagship battery electric vehicles and extended-range electric vehicles.
- J1: J1 Platform underpins the Porsche Taycan and Audi e-tron GT. It is derived from the MSB platform.
- MEB: Modularer Elektrobaukasten is an electric car platform developed by Volkswagen Group.
- PPE: Premium Platform Electric for larger electric car models co-developed by Audi and Porsche.
- SSP: Scalable Systems Platform is planned to be introduced in 2029.

== Other ==
The first generation of the Volkswagen Amarok (2H) is based on a specially developed chassis, while the second generation (NF) is based on and utilises the T6.2 platform in cooperation with Ford and shares many of the same parts as the second-generation Ford Ranger (P703/RA).
