= Jamie Barrow =

British snowboarder (born 1991)

Jamie Barrow (born 1992) is a British snowboarder. In 2018, at the speed of 93.2 mph, he broke the Guinness World Record for the fastest speed on a snowboard while being towed by a vehicle (a Maserati Levante) in St. Moritz, Switzerland. In 2022, Barrow broke his record for the fastest speed on a snowboard while being towed by a vehicle (an Audi e-tron GT) with a two-way average of 117.15 mph and a top speed of 131.11 mph.
