= Wilfried Rath =

German Human Resource executive (born 1964)

Wilfried von Rath
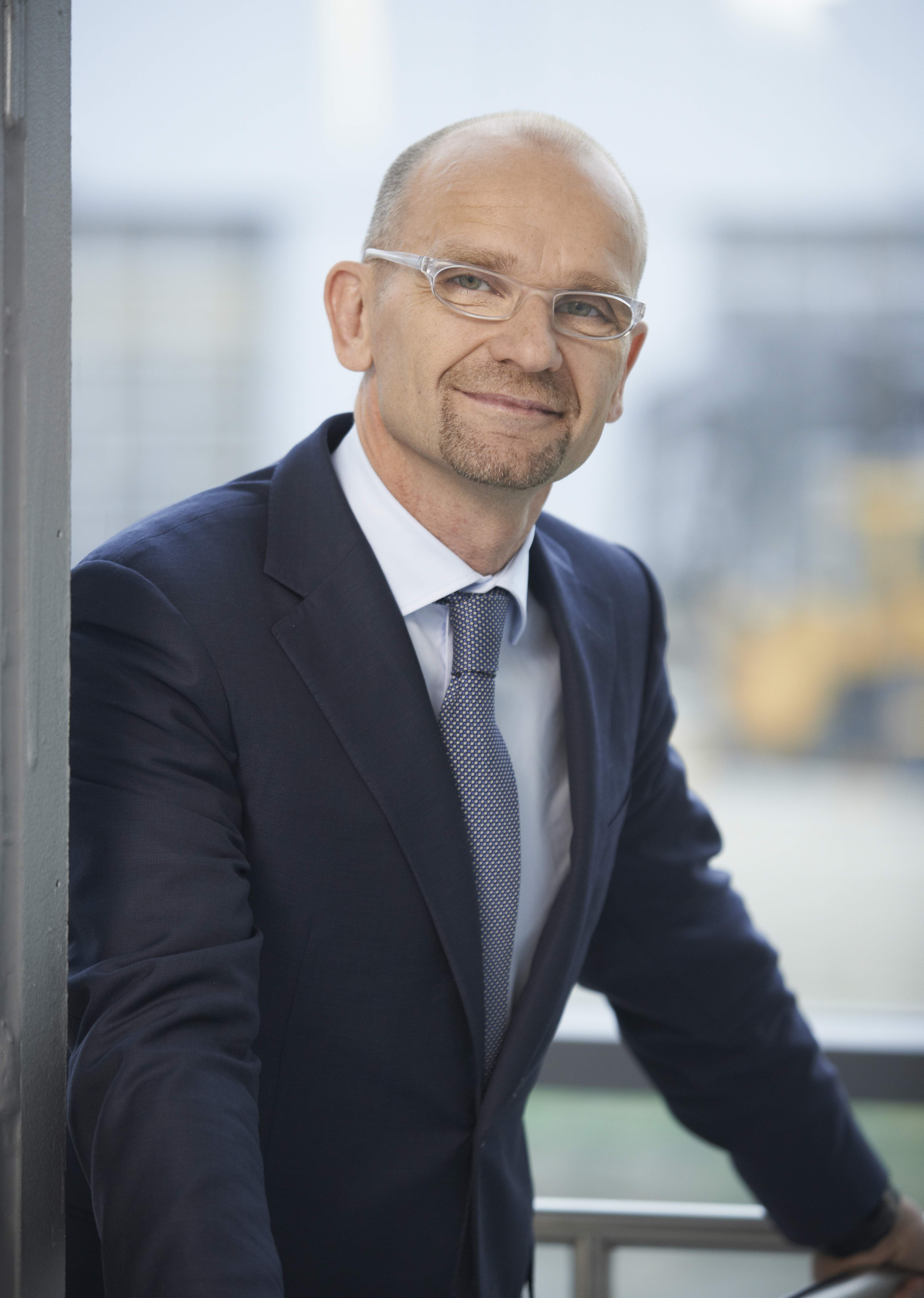
- Born: 1964 (age 61–62); Muelheim/Ruhr, Germany
- Education: Psychology degree from Ruhr-University Bochum, MBA from Ashridge Management College
- Alma mater: Ruhr-University
- Occupations: Senior Advisor for People Strategy, Leadership Coach
- Known for: CHRO of thyssenkrupp AG,Member of the Board of Management for Human Resources at Volkswagen Passenger Cars, Member of the Executive Board Human Resources at MAN Energy Solutions SE

Wilfried von Rath (born 1964) is a German Senior Advisor for People Strategy and Leadership Coach. He is the CHRO of thyssenkrupp AG in Essen. He is working with international clients on People Strategy implementation, HR transformation, M&A projects as well as programs for leadership and transition.

Wilfried was Member of the Board of Management for Human Resources at Volkswagen Passenger Cars and Member of the Executive Board Human Resources at MAN Energy Solutions SE.

== Early life and career ==
Wilfried was born in 1964 in Muelheim/Ruhr, Germany and holds a degree in psychology from Ruhr-University in Bochum and an MBA degree from Ashridge Management College in Berkhamsted, United Kingdom.

He began his career in 1991 as a Junior Partner with System Management, a consultancy company. In 1994, Wilfried joined the consulting arm of the Lufthansa Group and became Senior Consultant in 1996, where he ran projects for major Chinese and other international airlines in the fields of human resources, organization development and service quality management. In 1998, Wilfried moved to Volkswagen Coaching in Wolfsburg, where he later became a member of the management board. He was crucial for setting up Management Development Programs for the Volkswagen Group companies and the implementation of the Volkswagen Group Automobile University (AutoUni). Thereafter he was named Vice President Group HR Top Management for the Volkswagen Group in 2006. From 2011 he was appointed Board Member HR at Volkswagen Slovakia a.s. in Bratislava. During his time the company was expanded and enlarged through start of production of the Volkswagen Group New Small Family (NSF).

He moved to Augsburg in 2013 to become Member of the executive board for Human Resources of MAN Energy Solutions SE, where he managed the people side of MAN Energy Solutions’ green energy transformation from the predecessor company MAN Diesel & Turbo SE. In 2020 he was appointed Member of the Board of Management responsible for Human Resources at Volkswagen Passenger Cars, which is the core brand of the Volkswagen Group with more than 190,000 employees, 5.1 million cars produced and €71 billion in revenue (2020).

In addition, Wilfried has been Honorary Professor of the University of Applied Sciences Aachen since 2014.

== Personal life ==
Wilfried lives with his family in Augsburg (Germany) and has five children out of two marriages. He is an avid pilot and crossed the North Atlantic in a small twin engine propeller aircraft in 2018.
