= Volkswagen Group MSB platform =

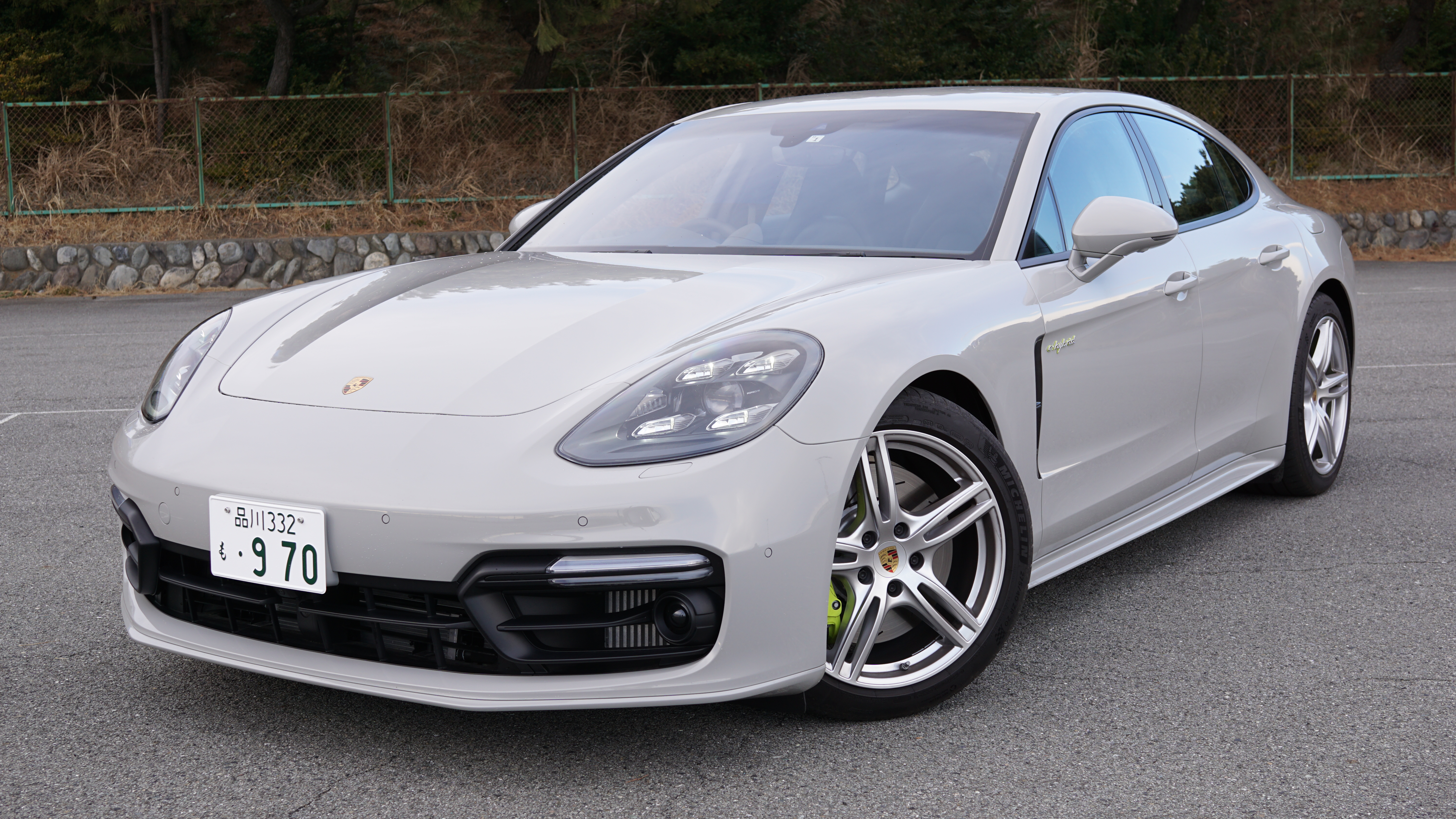
- The second generation Porsche Panamera was the first vehicle to be underpinned on this platform.

Overview
- Manufacturer: Volkswagen Group
- Production: 2017–present

Body and chassis
- Class: Executive car (E); Electric Executive car (E); Full-size luxury car (F) Ultra-luxury car; Grand tourer (S)
- Layout: Longitudinal Front-engine, rear-wheel-drive; Longitudinal Front-engine, four-wheel-drive

Chronology
- Predecessor: D1 (VW Phaeton/Bentley) platform

The Volkswagen Group MSB platform (Modularer Standardantriebsbaukasten, modular standard drivetrain matrix) is the company's strategy for shared modular design construction of its longitudinal, front-engine, rear-wheel-drive layout (optional front-engine, four-wheel-drive layout) automobiles. It was developed by Porsche for vehicles with longitudinally mounted engines and gearboxes and four-wheel or rear-wheel drive. It has been in use since 2016 and was introduced with the second generation Porsche Panamera.

== MSB-based models ==
The MSB architecture replaces the D1 platform and that used on the first generation 970 Porsche Panamera (G1).

=== Models ===
- Porsche Panamera (G2) (971, 2017–2024)
- Porsche Panamera (G3) (976, 2024–present)
- Bentley Continental GT third generation (Typ 3S, 2018–2024)
- Bentley Continental GT fourth generation (Typ 3S, 2024–present)
- Bentley Flying Spur third generation (Typ 3S, 2019–present)
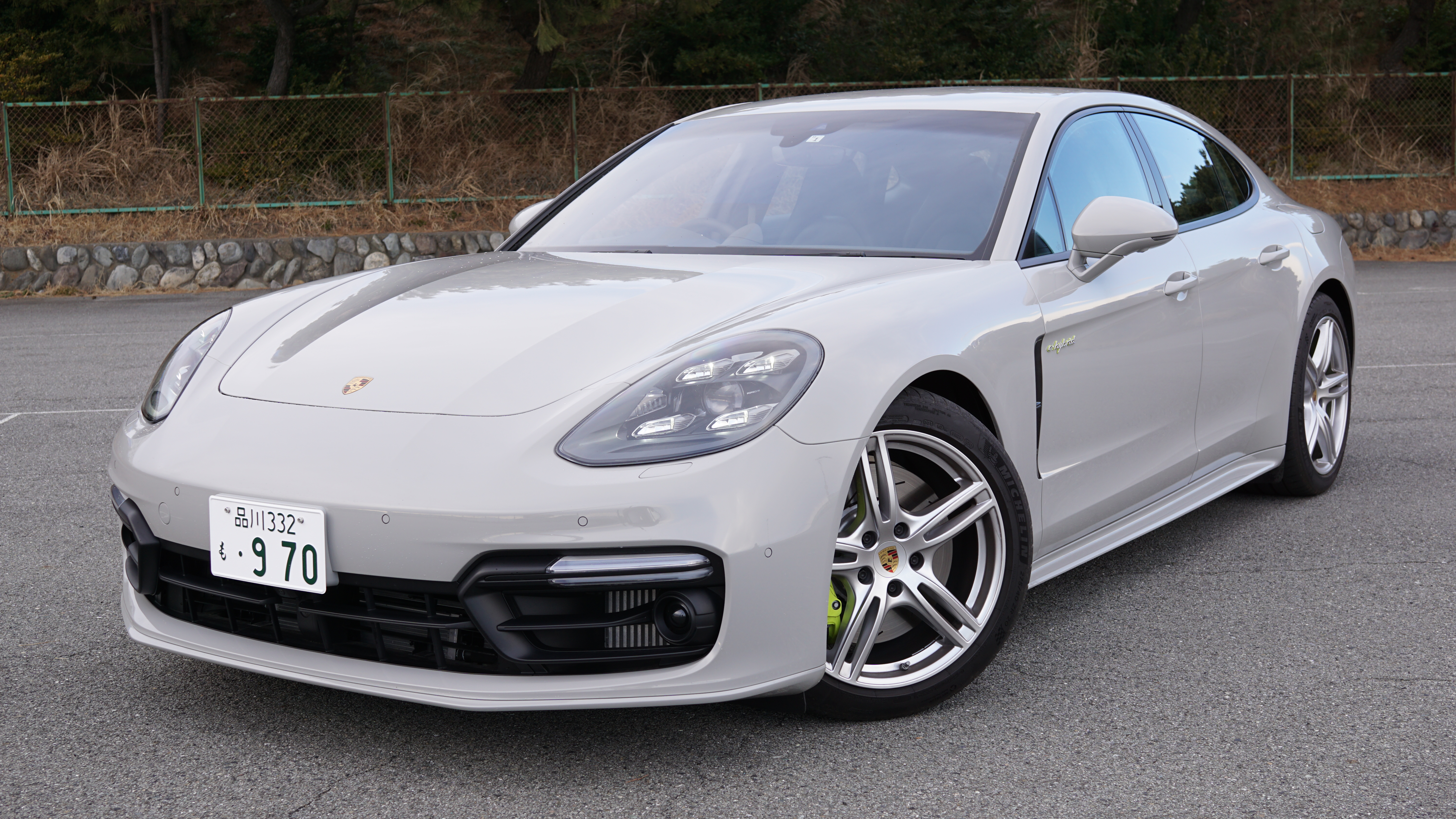
Porsche Panamera 971

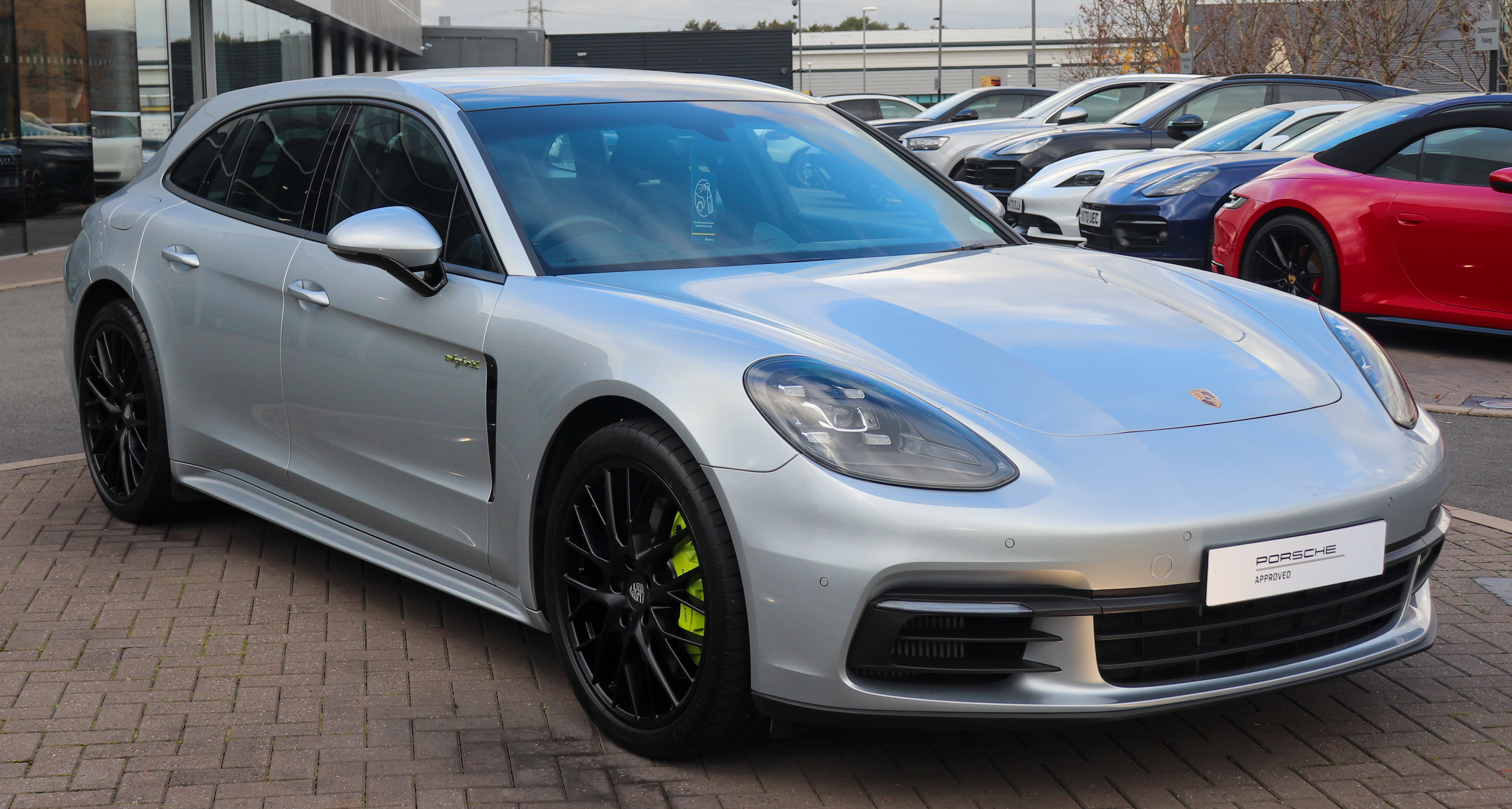
Porsche Panamera Sport Turismo 971

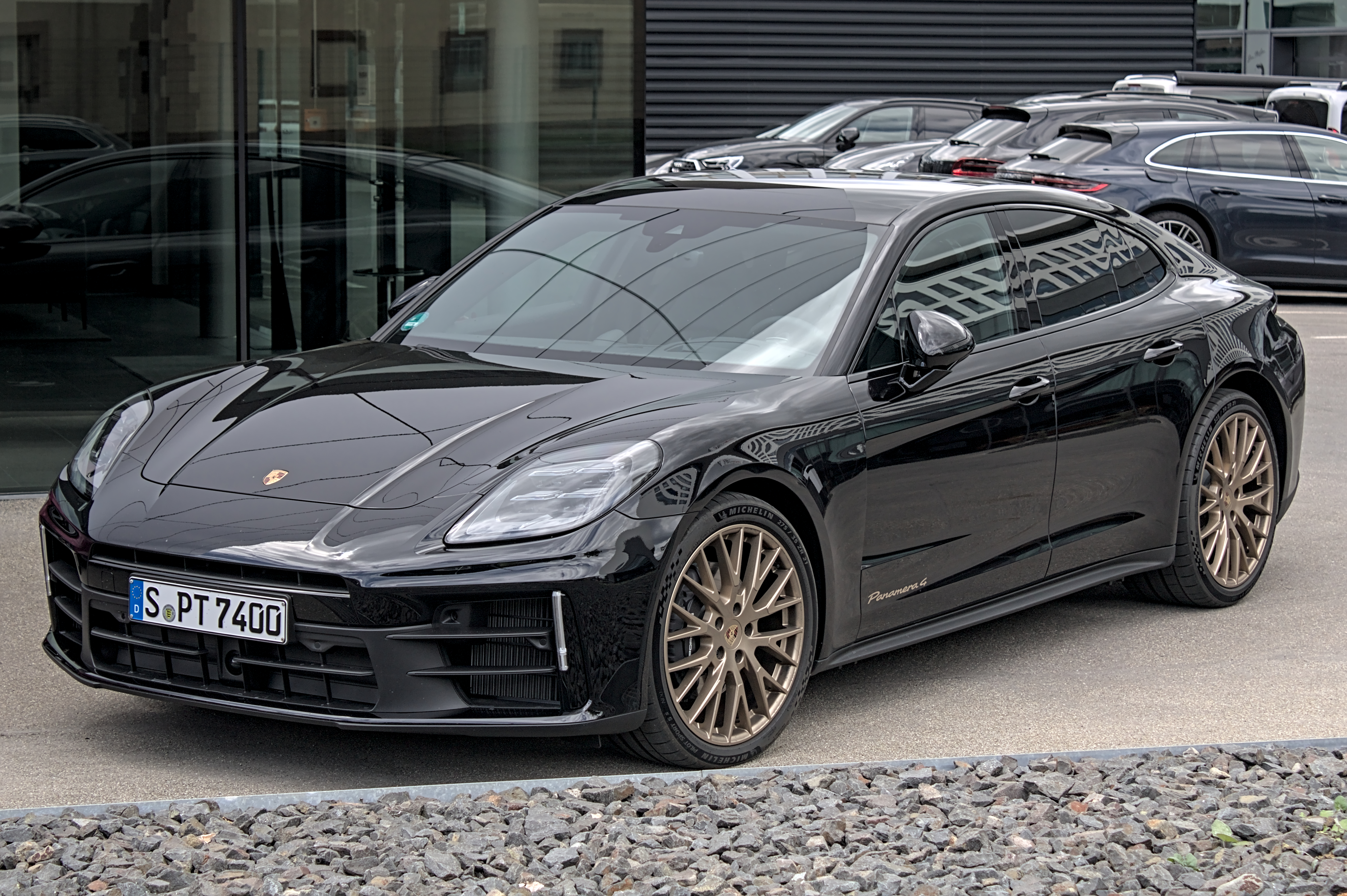
Porsche Panamera 976

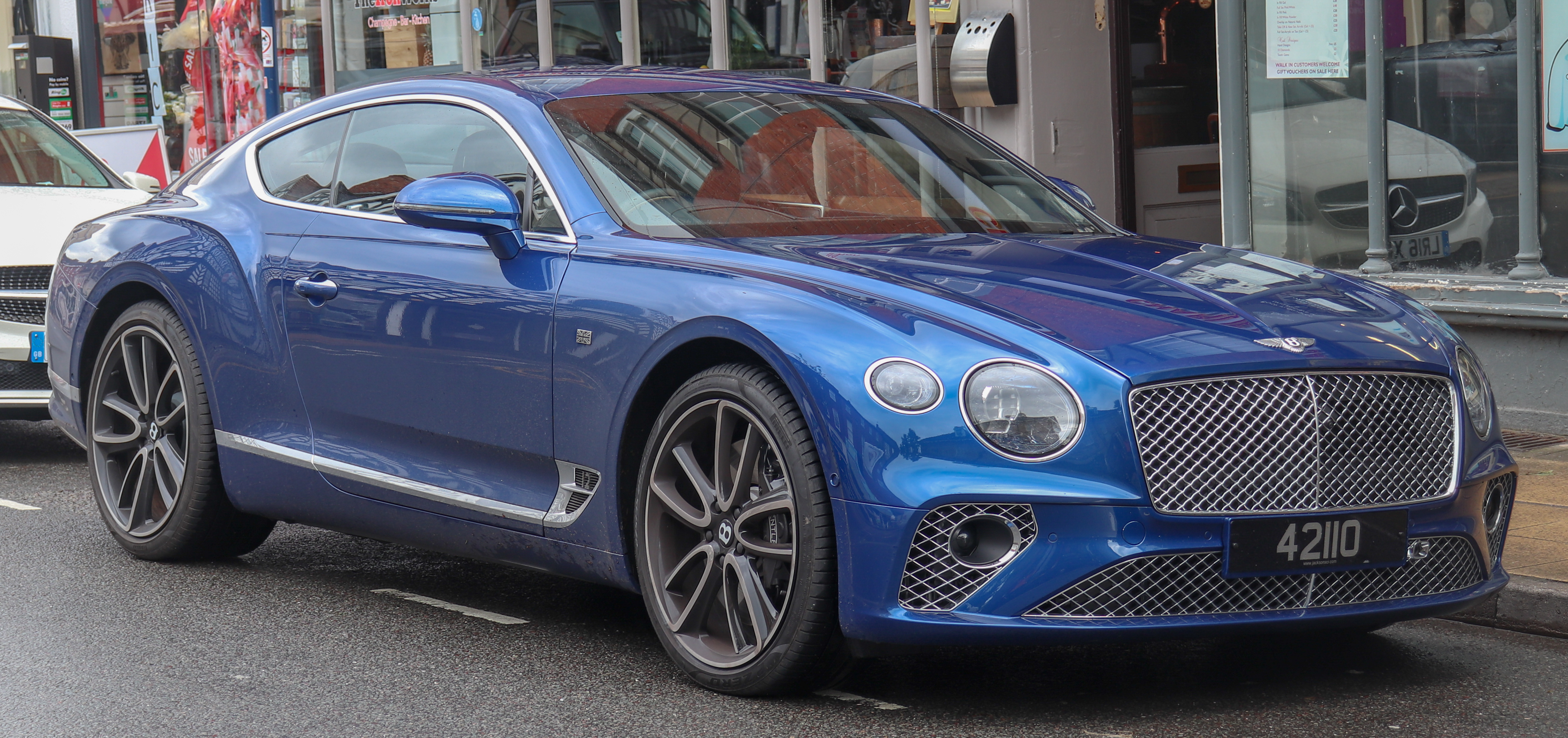
Bentley Continental GT 3rd Generation

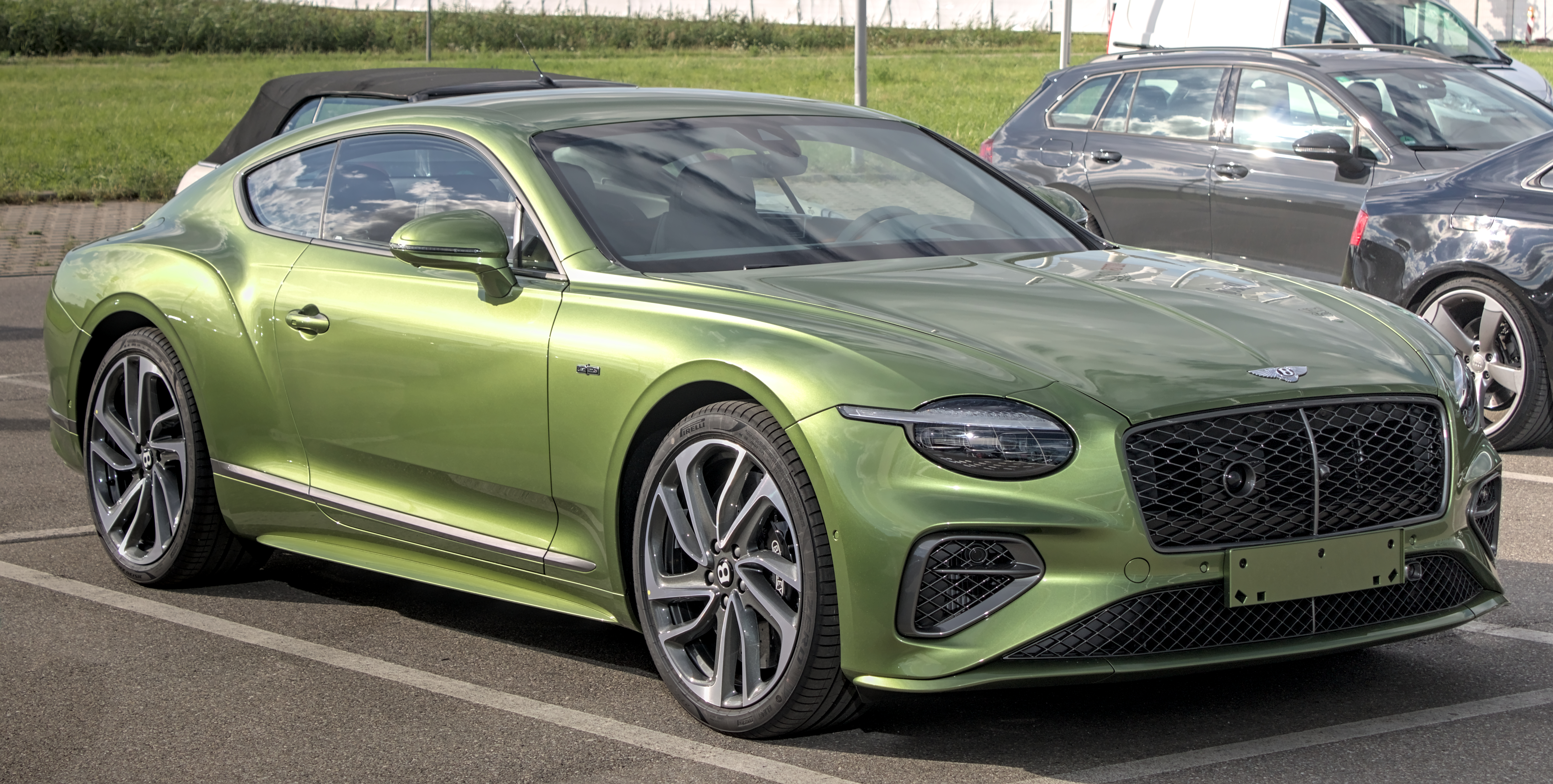
Bentley Continental GT 4th Generation

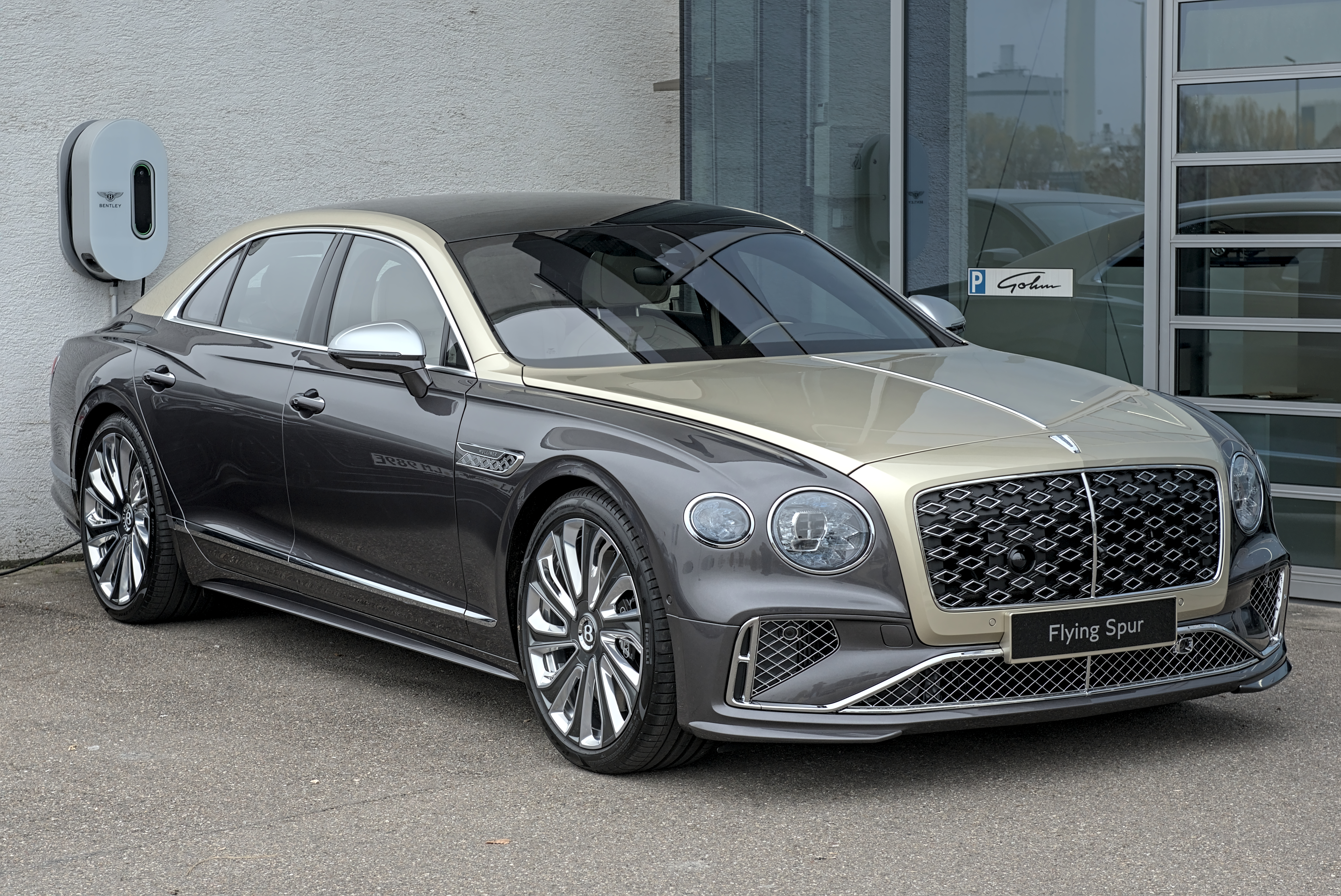
Bentley Flying Spur 3rd Generation

== J1 Platform Models ==
- Porsche Taycan (J1 Performance; 2019–present)
- Audi e-tron GT (J1 Performance; 2020–present)
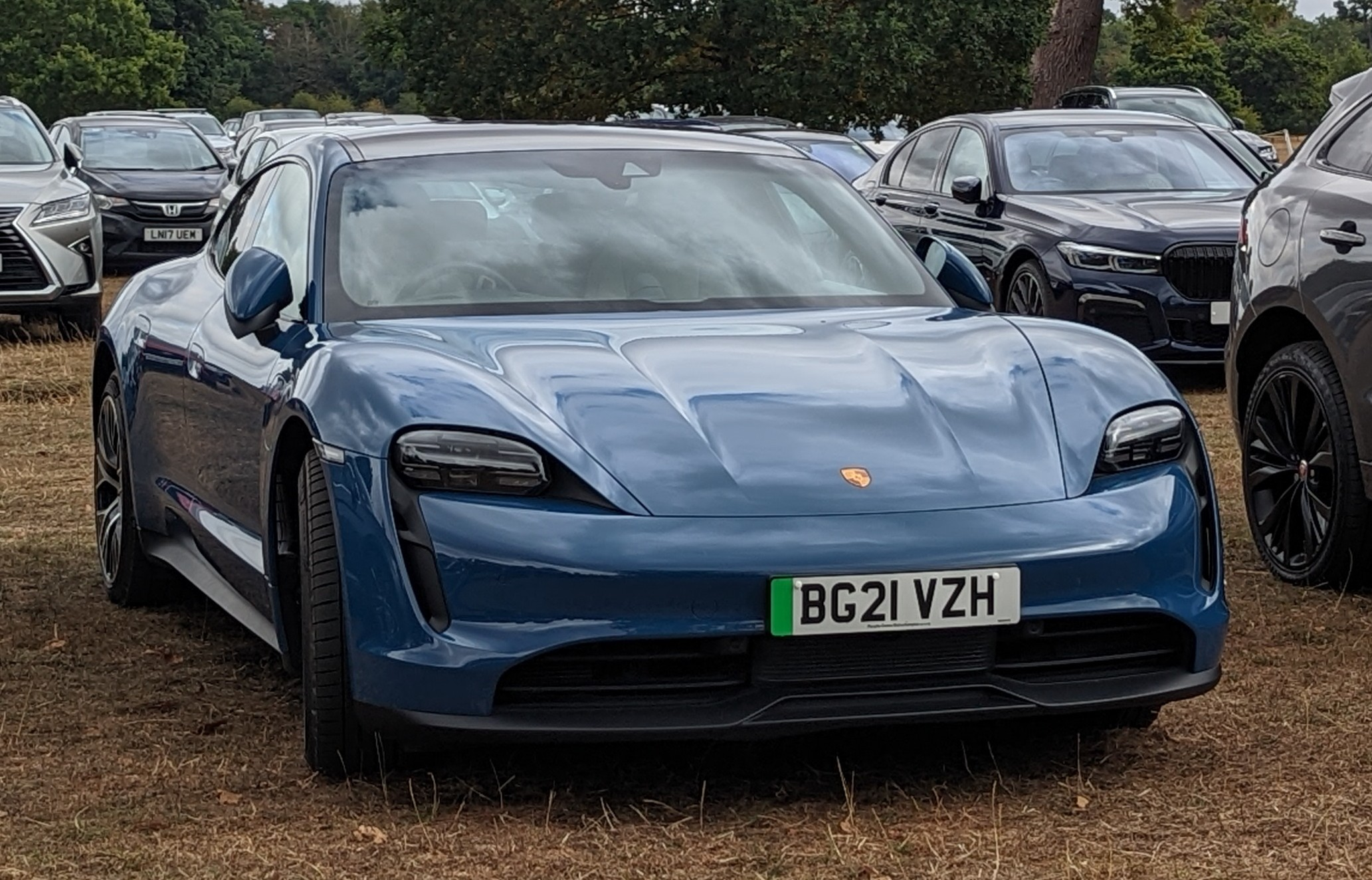
Porsche Taycan

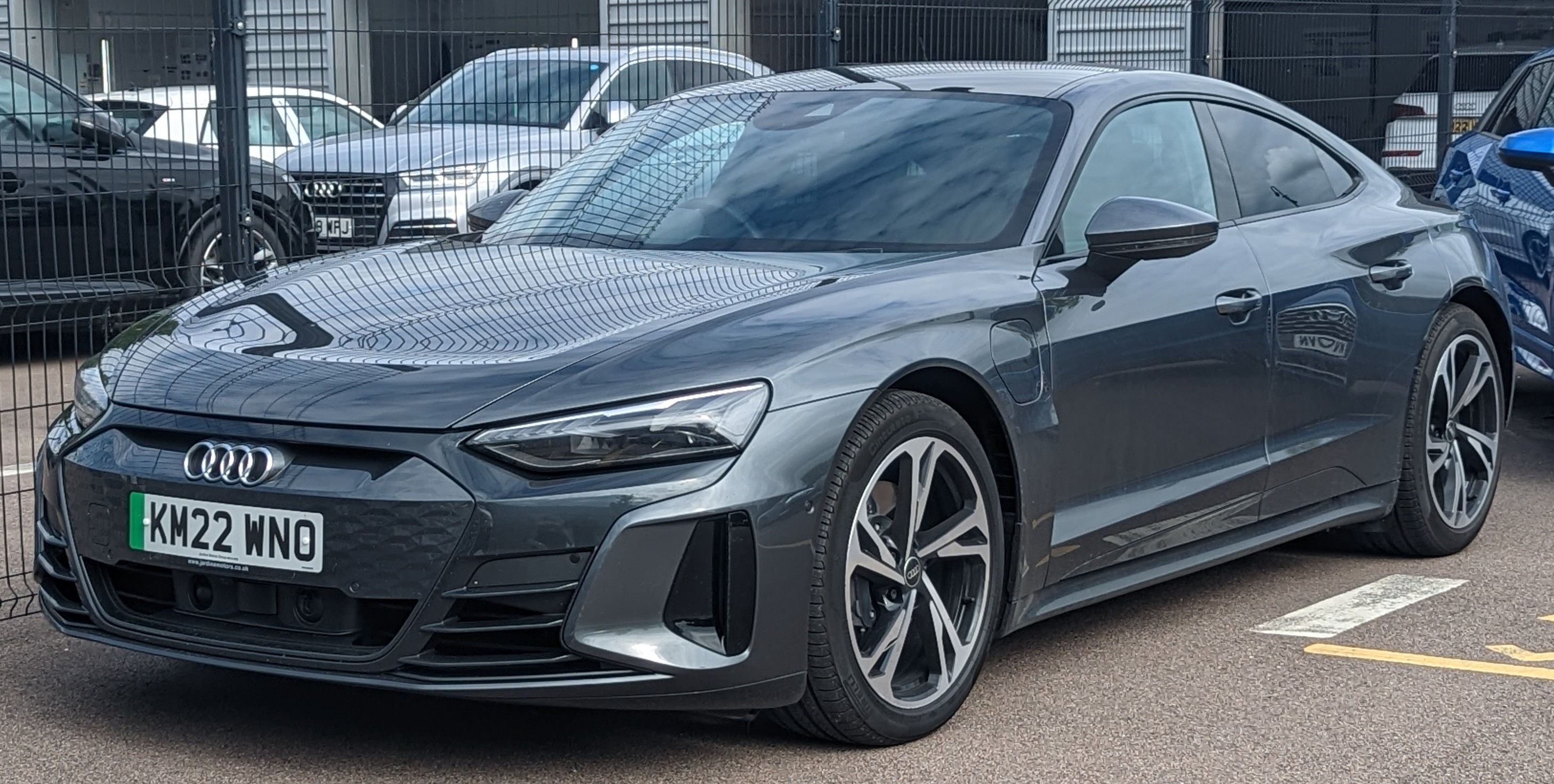
Audi e-tron GT

== See also ==
- Volkswagen Group MQB platform
- Volkswagen Group MLB platform
- Volkswagen Group MEB platform
- Volkswagen Group New Small Family platform
- List of Volkswagen Group platforms
