= Volkswagen Concept D =

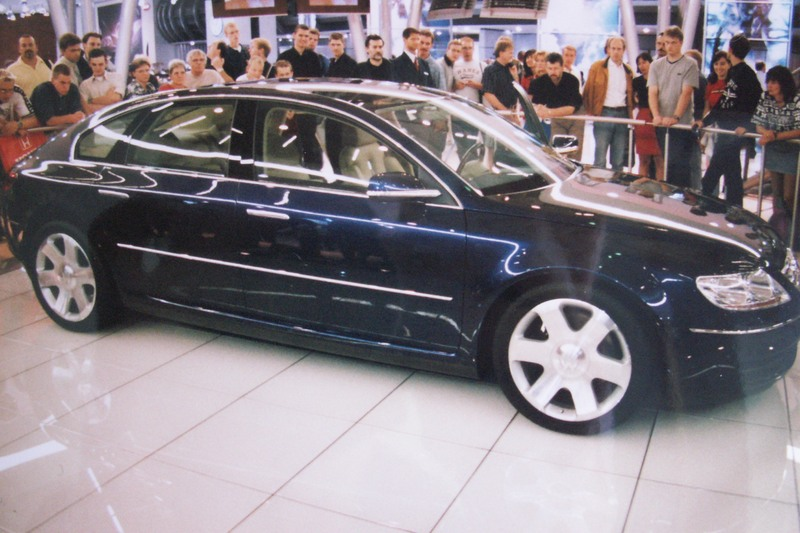

Overview
- Manufacturer: Volkswagen AG
- Production: 1999 (Concept car)

Body and chassis
- Class: Mid-size luxury car (liftback)
- Body style: 5-door liftback/fastback sedan
- Layout: front-engine design 4Motion (four-wheel drive)

Powertrain
- Engine: 5.0 V10 TDi (diesel engine)
- Transmission: 6-speed Tiptronic

Dimensions
- Length: 4,995 mm (196.7 in)
- Width: 1,874 mm (73.8 in)
- Height: 1,440 mm (56.7 in)
- Curb weight: 1,800 kg (3,968 lb)

Chronology
- Successor: Volkswagen Phaeton

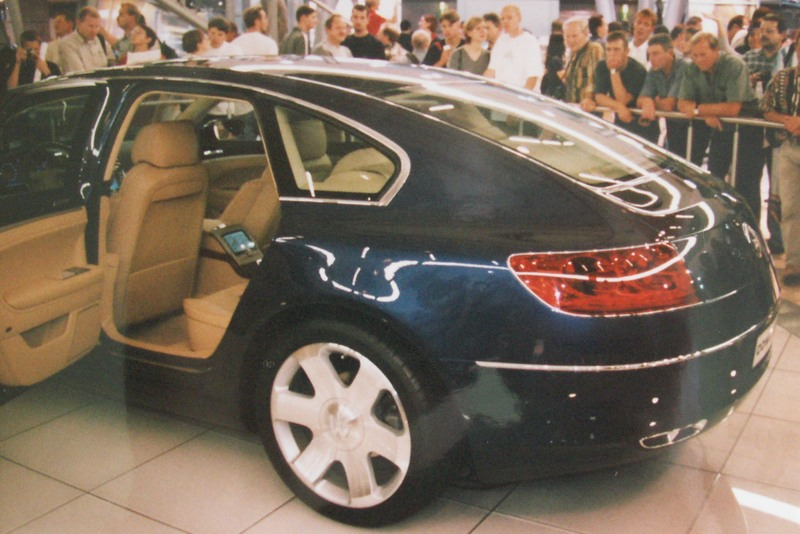
Rear-door view

The Volkswagen Concept D is a concept luxury liftback, which was unveiled at the 1999 International Motor Show Germany before going on public display. It was a five-door prototype of the luxury sedan, the Volkswagen Phaeton, which debuted in 2002.

The Concept D featured a V10 TDI diesel engine producing 230 kW (308 hp; 313 PS) at 4000 rpm and 750 N⋅m (553 lb⋅ft) of torque, paired with a six-speed Tiptronic transmission. It also featured 4Motion all-wheel drive, air suspension with adaptive damping and Bi Xenon headlamps.
