= Volkswagen Phaeton =

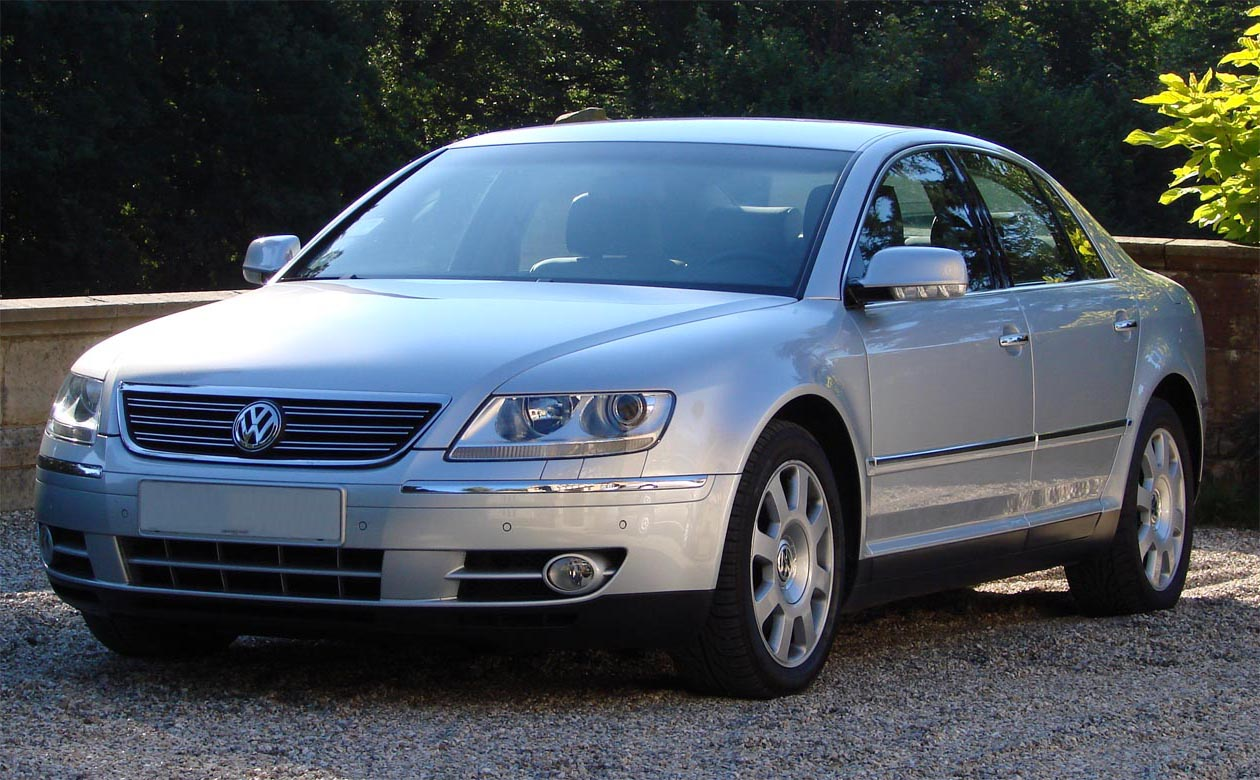

Overview
- Manufacturer: Volkswagen
- Production: November 2001 – March 2016
- Model years: 2002–2016
- Assembly: Germany: Dresden (Transparent Factory)
- Designer: Hartmut Warkuß (exterior)

Body and chassis
- Class: Full-size luxury car (F)
- Body style: 4-door sedan
- Layout: Longitudinal FF layout Longitudinal F4 layout (4motion)
- Platform: Volkswagen Group D1
- Related: Bentley Continental GT; Bentley Flying Spur

Powertrain
- Engine: Petrol: 3.0 L EA390 VR6 (China only); 3.2 L EA390 AYT / BKL / BRK VR6; 3.6 L EA390 VR6; 4.2 L BGH, BGJ V8; 6.0 L W12 (2004–2011); Diesel: 3.0 L TDI Common Rail (BMK / CARA / CEXA) V6 TDI; 5.0 L AJS V10 TDI (2003–2007)
- Transmission: 5-speed ZF 5HP24A automatic with tiptronic; 6-speed ZF 6HP26A automatic with tiptronic; 6-speed VW 01E manual (3.2 L VR6 only)

Dimensions
- Wheelbase: SWB: 2,881 mm (113.4 in); LWB: 3,001 mm (118.1 in)
- Length: 2002–2009: SWB: 5,055 mm (199.0 in); LWB: 5,120 mm (201.6 in); 2010–2016: SWB: 5,059 mm (199.2 in); LWB: 5,140 mm (202.4 in)
- Width: 1,903 mm (74.9 in)
- Height: 1,450 mm (57.1 in)
- Curb weight: 2,184–2,449 kg (4,815–5,399 lb)

Chronology
- Successor: Volkswagen Phideon (China)

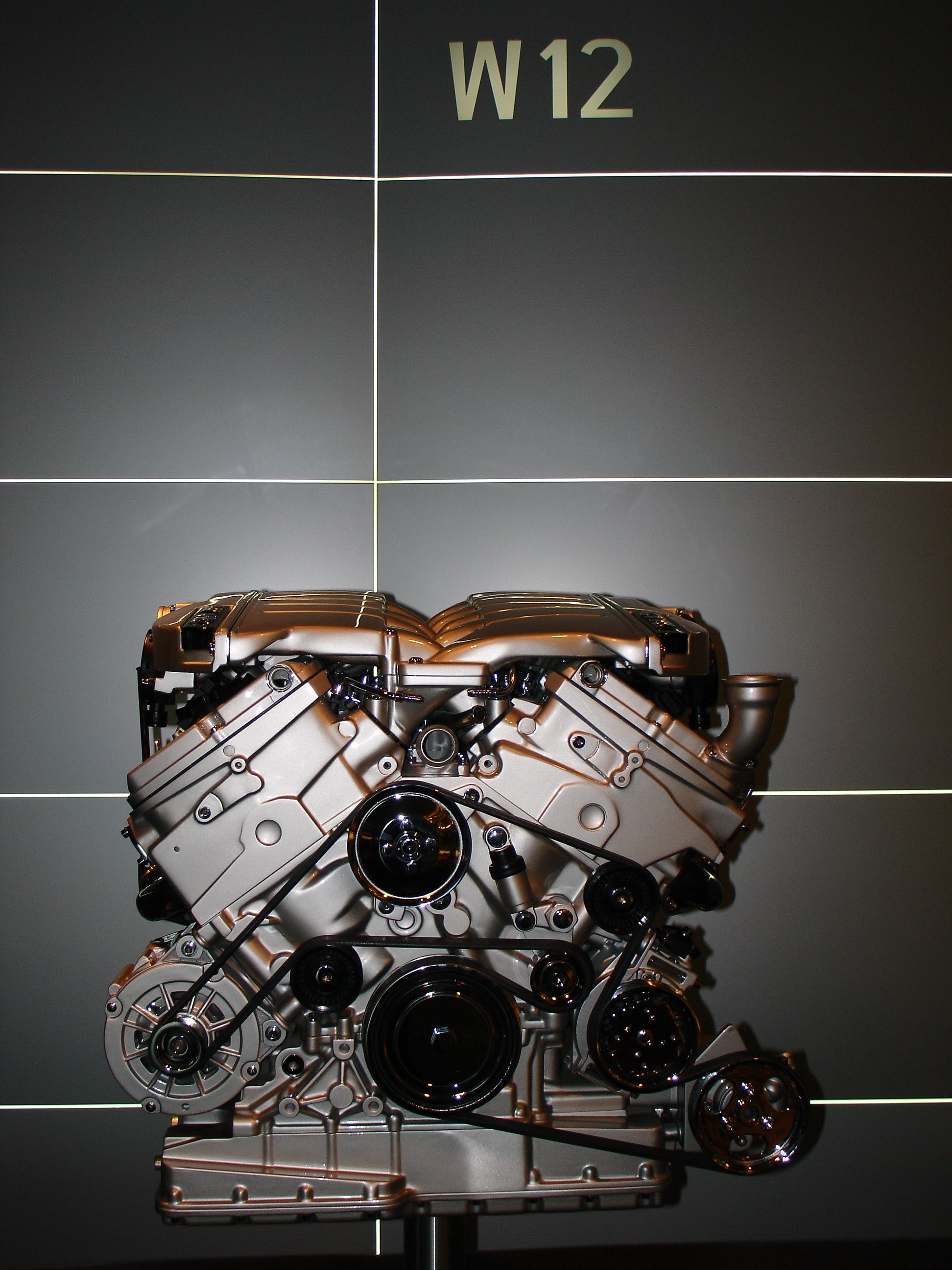
Volkswagen Group W-12 engine as fitted in the Phaeton W12

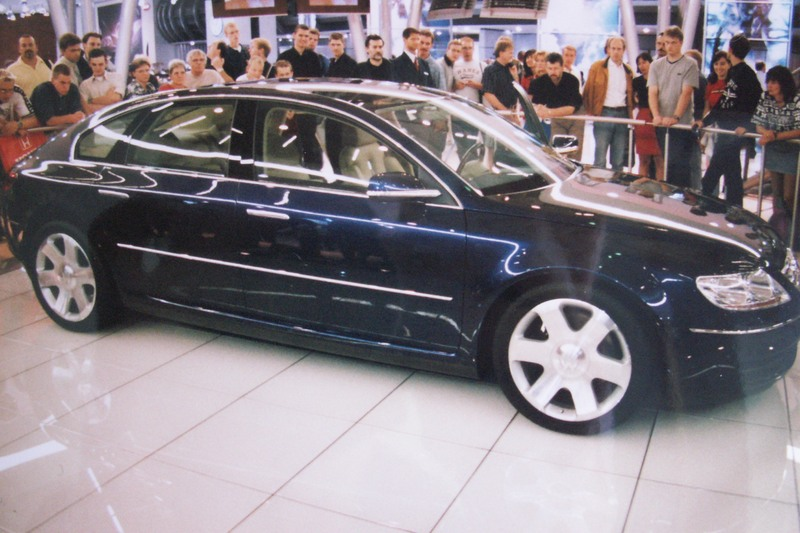
Volkswagen Concept D at IAA 1999 in Frankfurt

The Volkswagen Phaeton ( /ˈfeɪtən/ FAY-tən) (Typ 3D) is a full-size sedan/saloon manufactured by the German automobile manufacturer Volkswagen, described by Volkswagen as their "premium class" vehicle. Introduced at the 2002 Geneva Motor Show, the Phaeton was marketed worldwide. Sales in North America ended in 2006 and global sales ended in 2016.

The name Phaeton derives from Phaëton, the son of Phoebus (or Helios) in Greek mythology, by way of the phaeton auto body style and the type of horse-drawn carriage that preceded it.

Production ended in March 2016 and an all-electric second generation was slated to be produced. Starting in April 2017, the Transparent Factory Dresden began assembling the e-Golf instead.

== First and second series (GP0/GP1; 2002) ==
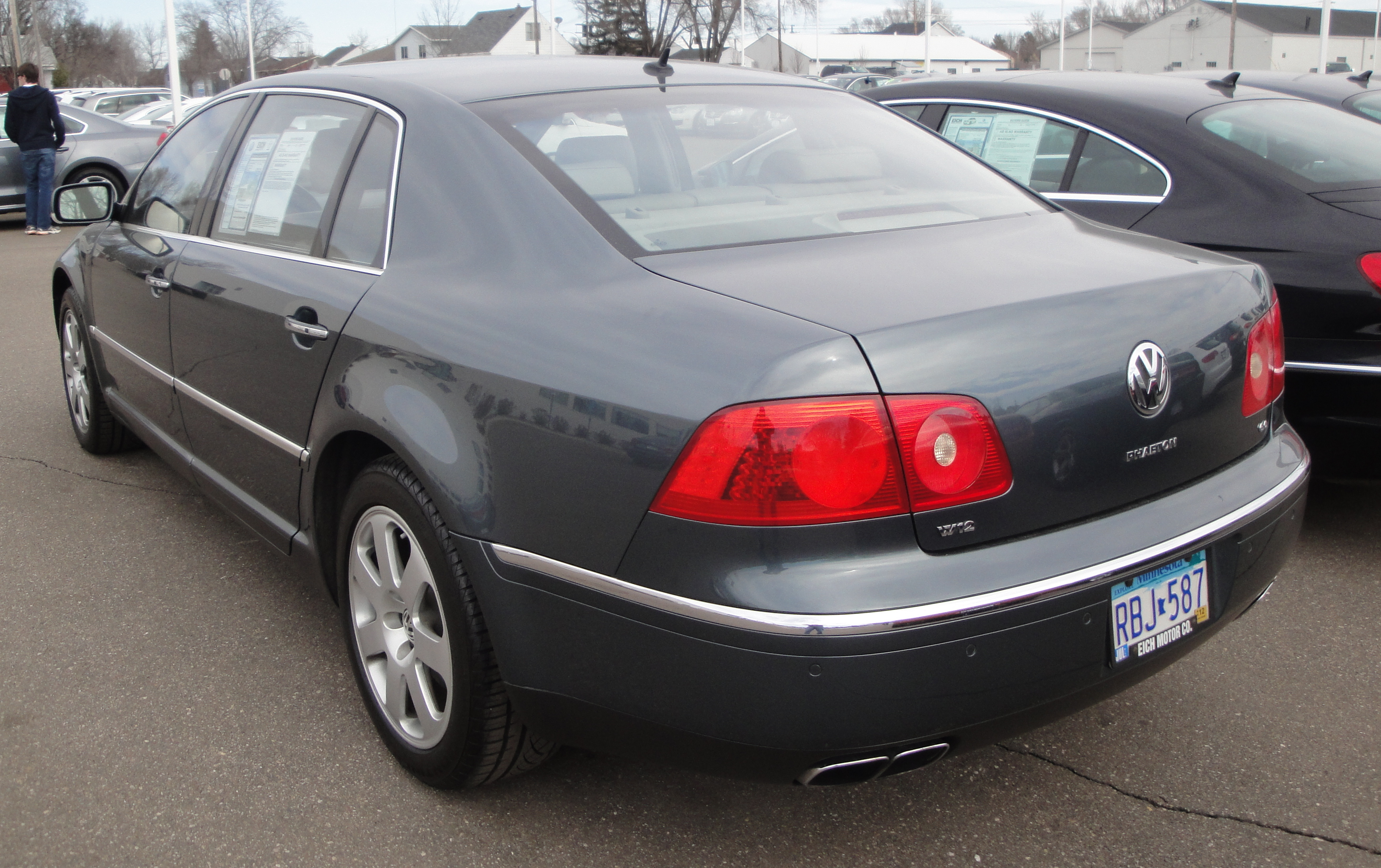
Pre-facelift Volkswagen Phaeton

=== Development ===
The Phaeton was conceived by Ferdinand Piëch, then chairman of Volkswagen Group, who wanted a car that would surpass the German prestige market leaders, Mercedes-Benz and BMW, in part as a response to Mercedes' and BMW's decision to compete in Europe directly with Volkswagen by introducing the A-Class and BMW 3 Series Compact. It was officially revealed at the 2002 Geneva International Motor Show.

Although the Volkswagen Group already had a direct competitor in the full sized luxury segment, the Audi A8, the Phaeton was intended to be more of a comfort-oriented limousine, like the Mercedes-Benz S-Class and Lexus LS, whereas the Audi A8 and BMW 7 Series are more performance-oriented. Piëch also wanted to move the VW brand upmarket, with the Phaeton serving as the brand's flagship model.

Initial development of the Phaeton, given the internal project code VW611, began with Piëch giving his engineers a list of ten parameters the car needed to fulfill. Most of these specifications were not made known to the public, but a number of them were told to automotive reporters.

One of them was that the Phaeton should be capable of being driven all day at 300 km/h (186 mph) with an exterior temperature of 50 °C (122 °F) whilst maintaining an interior temperature of 22 °C (72 °F). Piëch requested this even though the Phaeton's top speed was electronically limited to 250 km/h (155 mph). He also requested that if the car was driven at top speed for a long period and then suddenly came to an emergency stop, the oil pressure warning light should not come on.

Other requirements were that the car should have a torsional rigidity of 37,000 N·m/degree — by comparison, the Mercedes-Benz S-Class (W221) has a torsional rigidity of 27,500 N·m/degree — and that the electric motors that perform various functions in the vehicle be hidden for a cleaner look. Piëch also made a number of requests of the Phaeton's air conditioning and heating systems, an area which he admitted was a hobby of his, including that it should be completely draught-free and have four zones for climate control.

Another demand was that on a cold day the windows should defrost quickly and the driver should not have to sit in the car with a jacket, which was accomplished by the addition of a programmable auxiliary heating system with its own fuel pump to warm up the car before passengers entered.

According to Klaus Zyciora, head of interior design at Volkswagen at the time, the interior mockup for the Phaeton was the most expensive in the company's history.

At the 1999 International Motor Show Germany, Volkswagen presented the Concept D, a design study that previewed the production Phaeton. It featured a 4-door hatchback body style, V10 TDI engine, air suspension and all wheel drive.

=== Overview ===
The Phaeton used a special version of the Volkswagen D platform, designated D1. The D1 variant was shared with the Bentley Continental GT and Bentley Flying Spur, and was differentiated from the other D platform model, the Audi A8, by using all-steel construction, whereas the A8 continued to use the all-aluminum "Audi Space Frame" chassis. Certain systems, such as the automatic transmission and some engines, are shared with the A8.

Compared to the Audi A8L 4.2 litre FSI quattro, the Phaeton is 545 lb (247 kg) heavier but is still competitive with the lighter A8 in most driving tests, due to the Phaeton's increased engine power (335 hp versus 330) and a shorter axle ratio (3.65:1 versus 3.32). However, the weight gives the Phaeton considerably worse acceleration and poorer fuel economy compared to the A8.

The Phaeton had the longest wheelbase in the Volkswagen passenger car line.

Development of the vehicle led to over one hundred individual patents specific to the Phaeton.

=== Features ===
Notable standard features include Torsen based 4motion four-wheel drive (optional on the 3.2 L VR6), a draftless four zone climate system, automatic window anti-fogging system, and double glazed windows with UV protection.

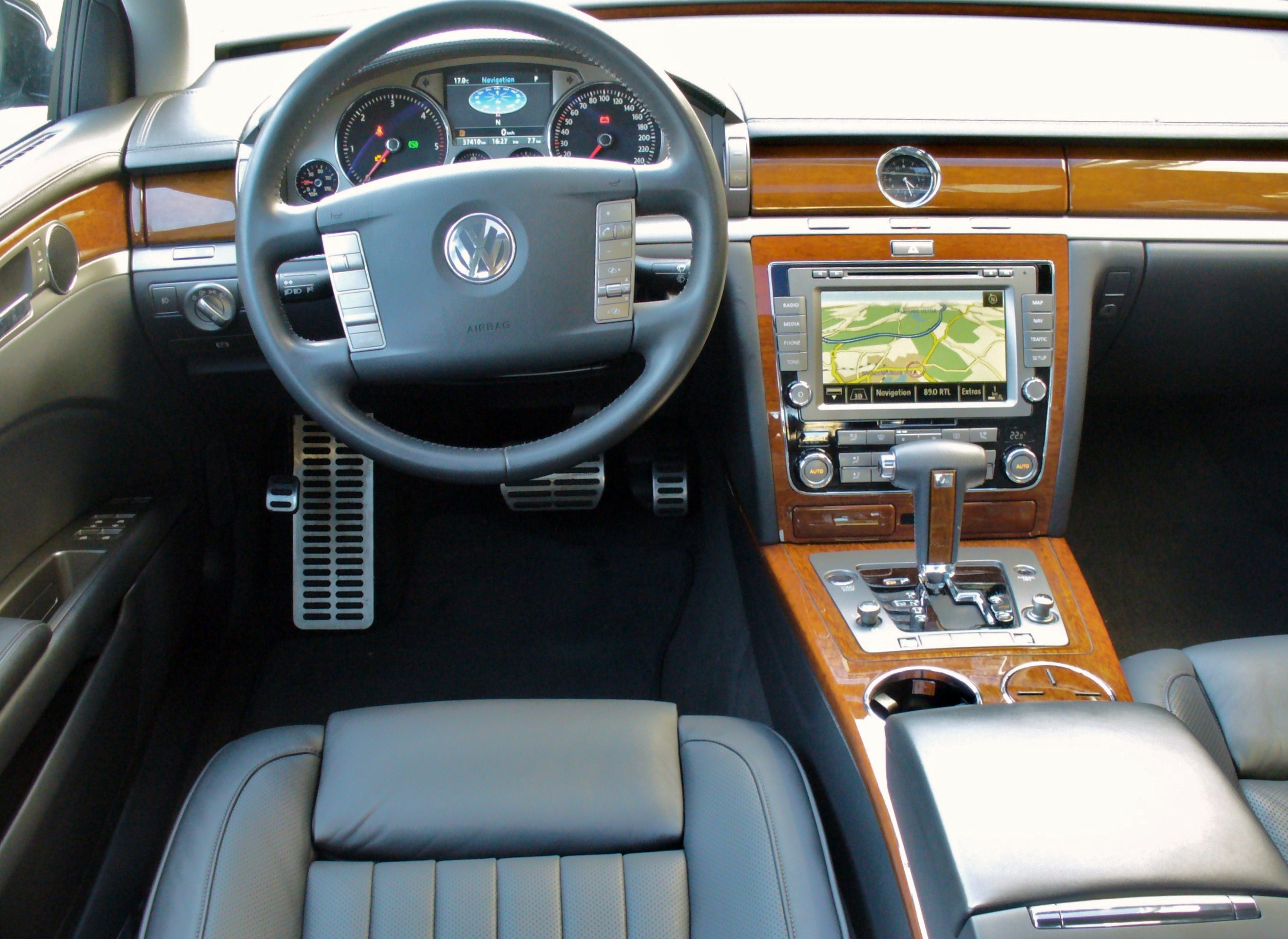
Interior

The Phaeton was offered with a standard five-seat configuration, with 12-way electrically adjustable, heated front seats with memory function, and an optional 18-way (driver) and 16-way (passenger) system, standard on the W12, that also incorporated ventilation and massage functions. The memory system stored the positions of the seats, seat-belt height, steering column and all three mirrors. The standard rear bench could be equipped with heating, while an upgraded rear bench added six-way power-adjustable lumbar support for the outer seats, ventilation, massage and seat occupancy detection. An optional four-seat configuration replaced the rear bench with two individual 10-way electrically adjustable seats with memory and an Easy Entry function; the system also allowed the front passenger seat to be adjusted from the rear.

Optional features include a programmable auxiliary heating system that can warm up the car before entry, a sunroof with integrated solar cells that could power the car's ventilation system when it was off, and electroluminescent license plates.

For ride comfort, it introduced front and rear Adaptive Air Suspension with Continuous Damping Control (CDC)-(Skyhook suspension). The same suspension system, with firmer settings, was introduced in the technically similar Audi A8 in November 2002.

The Phaeton was the first Volkswagen with radar adaptive cruise control: automatic distance regulator (ADR). Additionally, the 5.0 L V10 TDI engine option in the Phaeton marked the first ever use of a V10 engine in a production sedan.

=== Phaeton Lounge (2005) ===
The Phaeton Lounge was a concept car based on a lengthened version of the Phaeton with seating for four (two pairs of seats facing each other) in the rear compartment. It features a W12 engine, a reinforced chassis, six speed Tiptronic automatic transmission, individual climate control for each passenger, front and rear wine coolers, a minibar, multi color mood lighting, a cigar humidor, two 17 inch monitors, DVD changer in the trunk, second DVD player in the rear cabin, and a Bluetooth enabled computer with a broadband connection.

The vehicle was unveiled at the 2005 Middle East International Motor Show.

=== Production ===
The Phaeton was hand assembled in an eco friendly factory with a glass exterior, the Transparent Factory (German: Gläserne Manufaktur) in Dresden, Germany. This factory had a capacity of producing 20,000 vehicles a year, and was planned to expand to 35,000 vehicles a year. It also assembled Bentley Flying Spur vehicles destined for the European market until October 2006, when all assembly of the Bentley products was transferred to Crewe, England.

The Phaeton body was fabricated and painted at the Volkswagen works at Zwickau, Germany, and the completed bodies were transported approximately 100 km by special road transport vehicles to the main factory. Most Phaeton engines, the W12 being the notable exception, were built at the VW/Porsche/Audi engine plant in Győr, Hungary.

=== Reception and sales ===
Sales of the Phaeton fell far short of expectations. Its biggest market was China, followed by South Korea.

In 2002, the manufacturer stated the annual capacity of the new Phaeton plant at Dresden was 20,000; by September 2006 a four-year total of 25,000 had been built, with production running at approximately 6,000 cars annually. The domestic market was the Phaeton's strongest, with 19,314 Phaetons delivered in Germany alone by January 2009. Production decreased to 10,190 cars in 2012 and 5,812 in 2013. In the Phaeton's 15 year production run, 84,253 units were built.

In Canada, 93 Phaetons were sold in 2004, and in the first eight months of 2005, only 21 found owners. In the United States market, 1,433 Phaetons were sold in calendar year 2004, and 820 were sold in 2005, leading the company to announce that sales in the North American market would end after the 2006 model year. Volkswagen delivered another 235 cars in the United States in 2006, followed by 17 leftover cars during 2007. The W12 engined models have depreciated significantly, and sell for a small fraction of their original cost.

The Phaeton debuted at prices comparable to similar offerings from Mercedes-Benz, BMW, Lexus and the Volkswagen Group's own Audi A8 (which shared its powertrain with the Phaeton). Motor Trend suggested that the "VW badge on the hood may not say 'premium' to many auto shoppers" but they were impressed at how the Phaeton drove.

In January 2011, Volkswagen reported the possibility of bringing the Phaeton back to the US in the car's next product cycle. In Autumn 2013, The Economist placed Phaeton into the report on Europe's biggest loss making cars. In October 2014, Top Gear magazine placed the Phaeton on its list of "The worst cars you can buy right now."

In 2008, Volkswagen released the first update to the Phaeton. Subtle design changes were made by the introduction of chrome fog light covers and cherry red rear lights. The CD-based navigation system was upgraded to a DVD system, and the 3.0 V6 TDI engine had its power increased from 165 to 171 kW (224 to 232 PS; 221 to 229 bhp).

A 2013 report from Bernstein Research estimated that Volkswagen lost €28,101 on every Phaeton sold from 2002 to 2012, amounting to an estimate of almost €2,000,000,000 lost over that period.

The German Chancellor Gerhard Schröder chose Phaeton to be his official state car in his second term from 2002 to 2005. The reasoning can be generally correlated to the fact that before becoming chancellor, he previously served as the Minister-President of Lower Saxony in 1990–1998, where Volkswagen is headquartered in the city of Wolfsburg and is a major employer in the state and of which the Lower Saxony state government holds a 11.8% subscribed share capital, and 20% of voting rights in distribution, stake in Volkswagen AG.

== Third series (GP2; 2008) ==
The vehicle was unveiled at the 2007 Geneva Motor Show.

Update included new LED daytime running lights, as well as a freshened centre console with revamped controls and materials. New Fuel Stratified Injection (FSI) V6 petrol engine with greater power and fuel efficiency (206 kW / 280 PS) which satisfy Euro-5 emissions standards is also available.

Other changes to the car for 2009 included: three new types of alloy wheels (17, 18 and 19 inch), a slightly modified radiator grille, three new exterior colours, the new leather colour, the new wood trims, white switch illumination instead of red, accent and switch trim in the new "Warm gray" colour, an upgraded car key, makeup mirror in the rear on the LWB version, dampers optimised for low-friction, Carbon fibre-reinforced Silicon Carbide (C/SiC) ceramic composite brakes (front) on the Phaeton W12, as well as a rearview camera (Rear Assist) and blind spot warning system Side Assist.

== Fourth series (GP3; 2011) ==
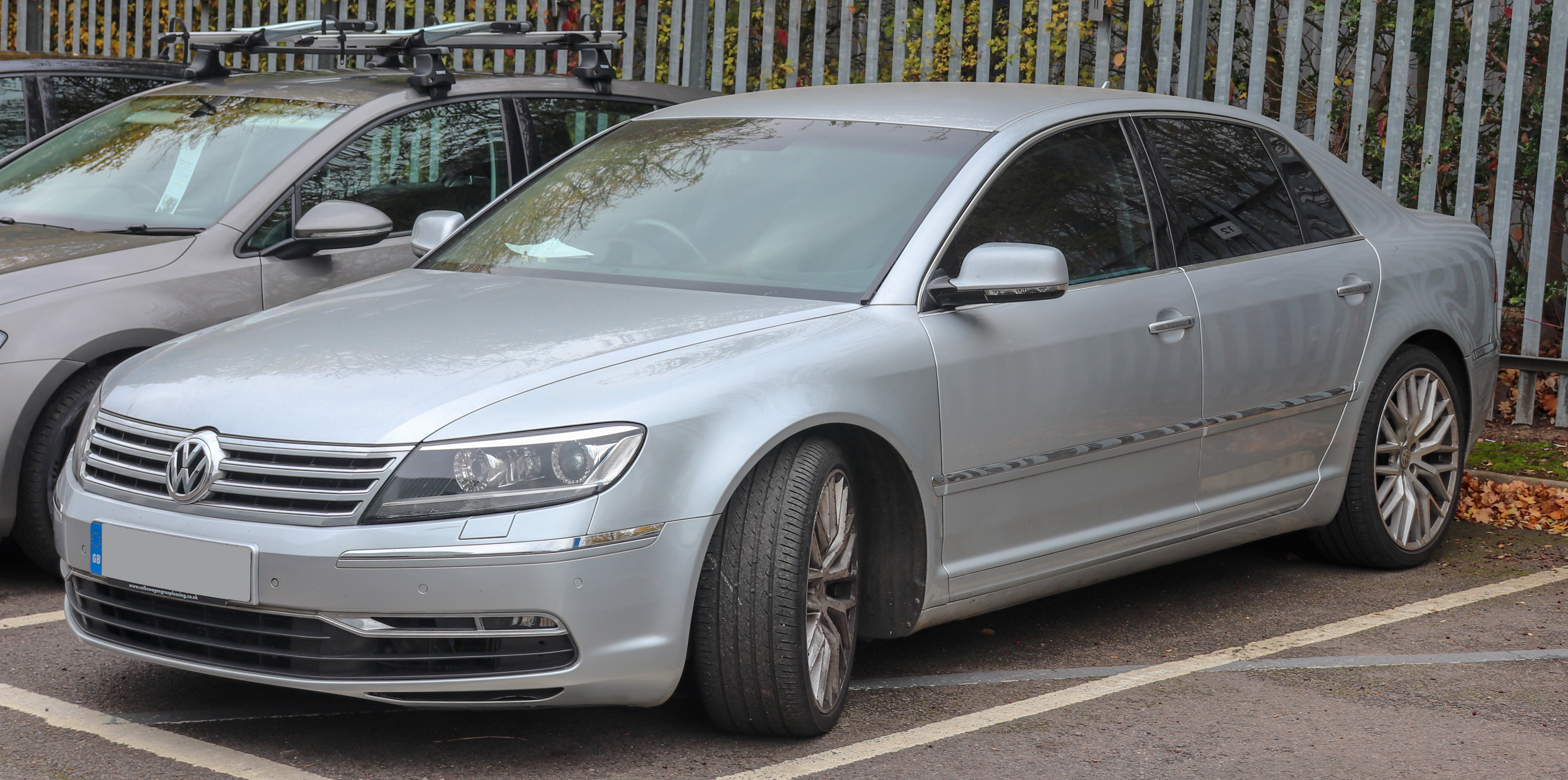
Volkswagen Phaeton (second facelift)

The vehicle was unveiled in the 2010 Beijing International Automotive Exhibition.

The car for 2011 got a new front fascia to more closely resemble the Volkswagen styling direction first seen on the Golf Mk VI. This included new LED running lights, bi-xenon headlights and a new bumper with LED fog lights. The rear LED clusters were altered to mimic those found on facelifted Touran, Sharan, the new Touareg and the new Passat.

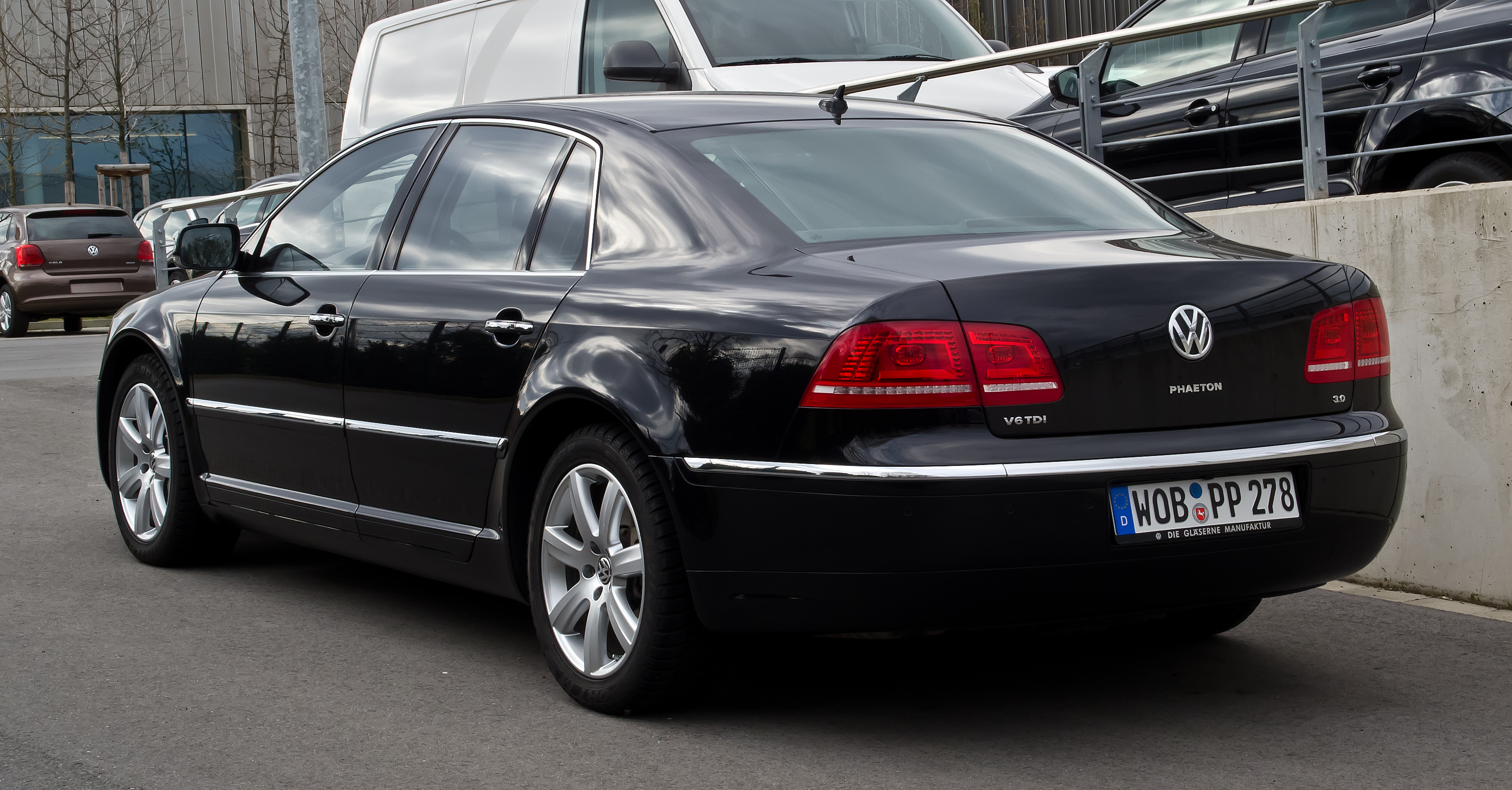
Volkswagen Phaeton (second facelift)

The interior benefited from some new technologies, but retained the 2009 MY layout. The Phaeton was offered in two wheelbase lengths (standard and long) and two seating layouts (standard five seats and optional four seats with full centre console). In the five-seat version, the front seats can be adjusted 12 ways. Standard features include all wheel drive, air suspension, and four zone automatic climate control. A multifunction steering wheel can be ordered in leather or wood leather.

After the 2011 model year, the W12 engine option was deleted from the European and international markets except China where it was still offered until the end of Phaeton production in 2016.

== Fifth series (GP4; 2014) ==
A further, minor facelift was introduced in 2014, including exterior alterations to the front fog lights and darkened rear lights. The interior was also updated including a new gear lever, gloss black accents around the gear lever and steering controls and the introduction of a new removable touch screen remote for rear passengers.

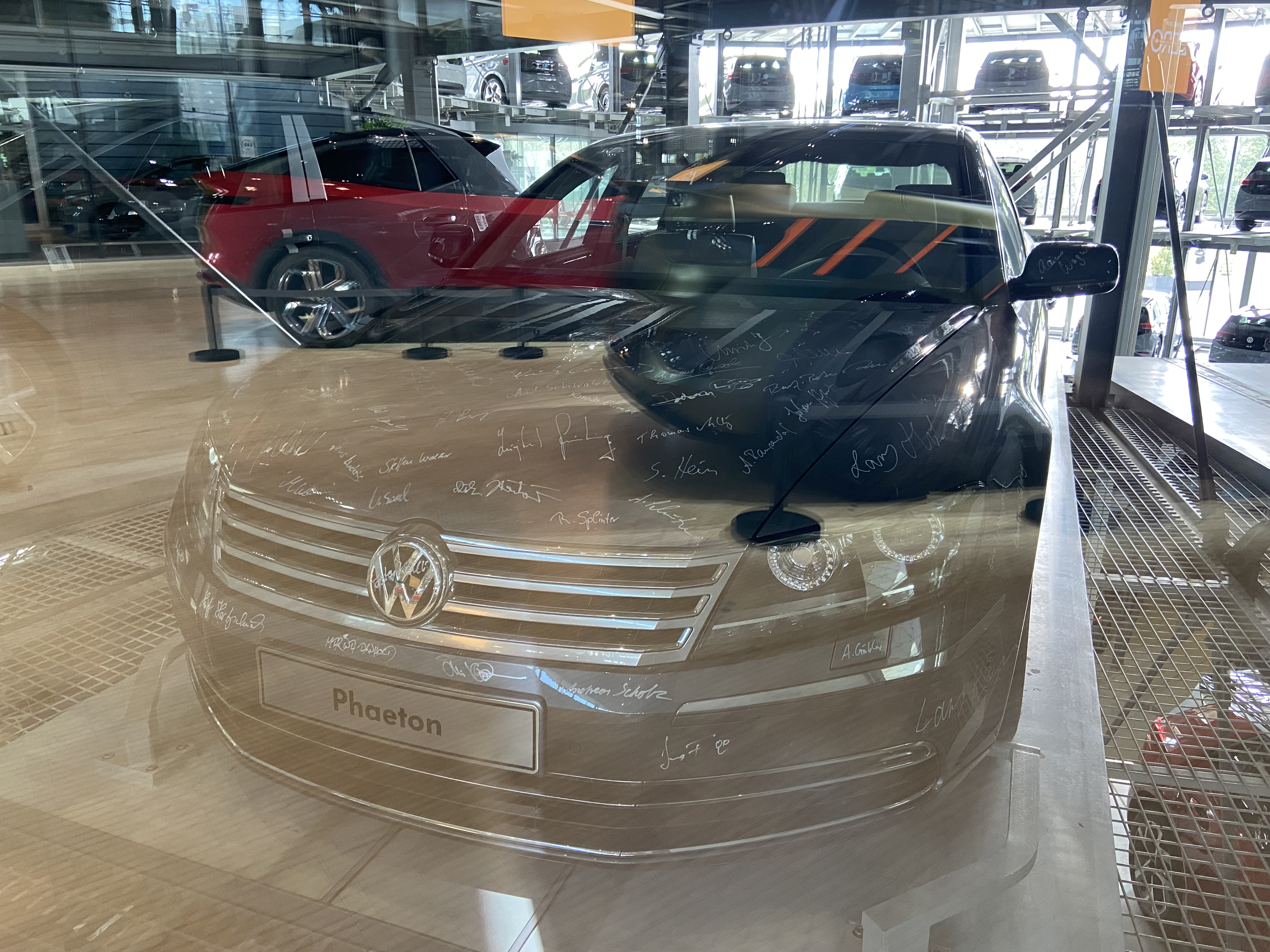
The last Phaeton produced; signed by the Dresden factory workers.

=== New technologies ===
- Automatic Distance Control adaptive cruise control with new Stop&Go function
- Front Assist collision avoidance system
- Dynamic Light Assist non-glare highbeam
- Traffic sign recognition that can also detect overtaking restrictions
- GPS navigation with Google Earth
- 3G mobile internet (UMTS)

=== Transmissions ===
Petrol engines
Model	Years	Types
3.2 V6	2003–2004	Five speed automatic (front-wheel-drive)
3.2 V6	2003–2007	Six speed automatic (front-wheel-drive)
3.2 V6	2004–2009	Six speed automatic (4motion)
3.6 V6 FSI	2010–2015	Six speed automatic
4.2 V8	2010–2016	Six speed automatic
6.0 W12	2010–2011	Five speed automatic

Diesel engines
Model	Years	Types
3.0 V6 TDI	2010–2016	Six speed automatic
5.0 V10 TDI	2003–2007	Six speed automatic

== Second generation ==
Before the Phaeton was discontinued in 2016, development of the second generation had already begun, with a near-production prototype already completed, which Volkswagen revealed in 2022.

== Powertrain ==
As of 2007, powertrain options for the Phaeton included the following engines. 4motion permanent four-wheel drive was the only driveline system available, except for the 2003 and 2004 model years when front wheel drive was available with the 3.2 litre engine.

Petrol engines
Model	Years	Engine codes	Engine type	Power, torque at rpm	0–100 km/h (62 mph)	Top speed
3.0 VR6	2012–2016 (China only)	CPF	2,975 cc (181.5 cu in) VR6	250 PS (184 kW; 247 bhp) at 6,400, 310 N⋅m (229 lbf⋅ft) at 3,500	10.2 seconds	240 km/h (149.1 mph)
3.2 VR6	2002–2008	AYT / BKL / BRK	3,189 cc (194.6 cu in) VR6	241 PS (177 kW; 238 bhp) at 6,200, 315 N⋅m (232 lbf⋅ft) at 2,400	9.4 seconds	239 km/h (148.5 mph)
3.6 VR6	2008–2016	?	3,597 cc (219.5 cu in) VR6	280 PS (206 kW; 276 bhp) at 6,250, 370 N⋅m (273 lbf⋅ft) at 3,500	8.6 seconds	250 km/h (155.3 mph) (limited)
4.2 V8	2002–2016	BGH / BGJ / ?	4,172 cc (254.6 cu in) V8	335 PS (246 kW; 330 bhp) at 6,500, 430 N⋅m (317 lbf⋅ft) at 3,500	6.9 seconds	250 km/h (155.3 mph) (limited)
6.0 W12 LWB (420PS)	2002–2004	BAN	5,998 cc (366.0 cu in) W12	420 PS (309 kW; 414 bhp) at 6,000, 550 N⋅m (406 lbf⋅ft) at 3,000	6.1 seconds	250 km/h (155.3 mph) (limited)
6.0 W12 LWB (450PS)	2004–2011	BRN / BTT	5,998 cc (366.0 cu in) W12	450 PS (331 kW; 444 bhp) at 6,050, 560 N⋅m (413 lbf⋅ft) at 2,750-5,200	6.1 seconds	250 km/h (155.3 mph) (limited)

Diesel engines
Model	Years	Engine codes	Engine type	Power, torque at rpm	0–100 km/h (62 mph) (s)	Top speed
3.0 V6 TDI (225PS)	2004–2006	BMK	2,967 cc (181.1 cu in) V6 turbo	225 PS (165 kW; 222 bhp) at 4,000, 450 N⋅m (332 lbf⋅ft) at 1,400	8.8 seconds	234 km/h (145.4 mph)
3.0 V6 TDI (233PS)	2007–2008	CARA	2,967 cc (181.1 cu in) V6 turbo	233 PS (171 kW; 230 bhp) at 4,000, 450 N⋅m (332 lbf⋅ft) at 1,400	8.4 seconds	234 km/h (145.4 mph)
3.0 V6 TDI (240PS)	2008–2013	CEXA	2,967 cc (181.1 cu in) V6 turbo	240 PS (177 kW; 237 bhp) at 4,000, 500 N⋅m (369 lbf⋅ft) at 1,500-3,500	8.3 seconds	237 km/h (147.3 mph)
3.0 V6 TDI (245PS)	2014–2016	CEXB	2,967 cc (181.1 cu in) V6 turbo	245 PS (180 kW; 242 bhp) at 4,000, 500 N⋅m (369 lbf⋅ft) at 1,500-3,500	8.3 seconds	237 km/h (147.3 mph)
5.0 V10 TDI	2003–2007	AJS	4,921 cc (300.3 cu in) V10 turbo	313 PS (230 kW; 309 bhp) at 3,750, 750 N⋅m (553 lbf⋅ft) at 2,000	6.9 seconds	250 km/h (155.3 mph) (limited)

Vehicles manufactured for sale in the North American market were only available with the 4.2 litre V8 and 6.0 litre W12 engine, both of which were electronically limited to 210 km/h (130.5 mph).

The Phaeton features a Bosch ESP 5.7 Electronic Stability Programme, with Anti-Lock Braking System (ABS), Electronic Brakeforce Distribution (EBD), Anti-Slip Regulation (ASR) traction control system, Electronic Differential Lock (EDL), Engine Braking Control (EBC), with emergency Brake Assist (BA).

The electronic differential lock (EDL) employed by Volkswagen is not, as the name suggests, a differential lock at all. Sensors monitor wheel speeds across an individual driven axle, and if one wheel is rotating substantially faster than the other (i.e. slipping) the EDL system momentarily brakes it. This effectively transfers power to the other wheel.

Volkswagen was developing an electric version, but replaced it with their MEB2 platform for 2020.

== See also ==
- Volkswagen Phideon
