= Audi e-tron GT =

Battery electric executive car

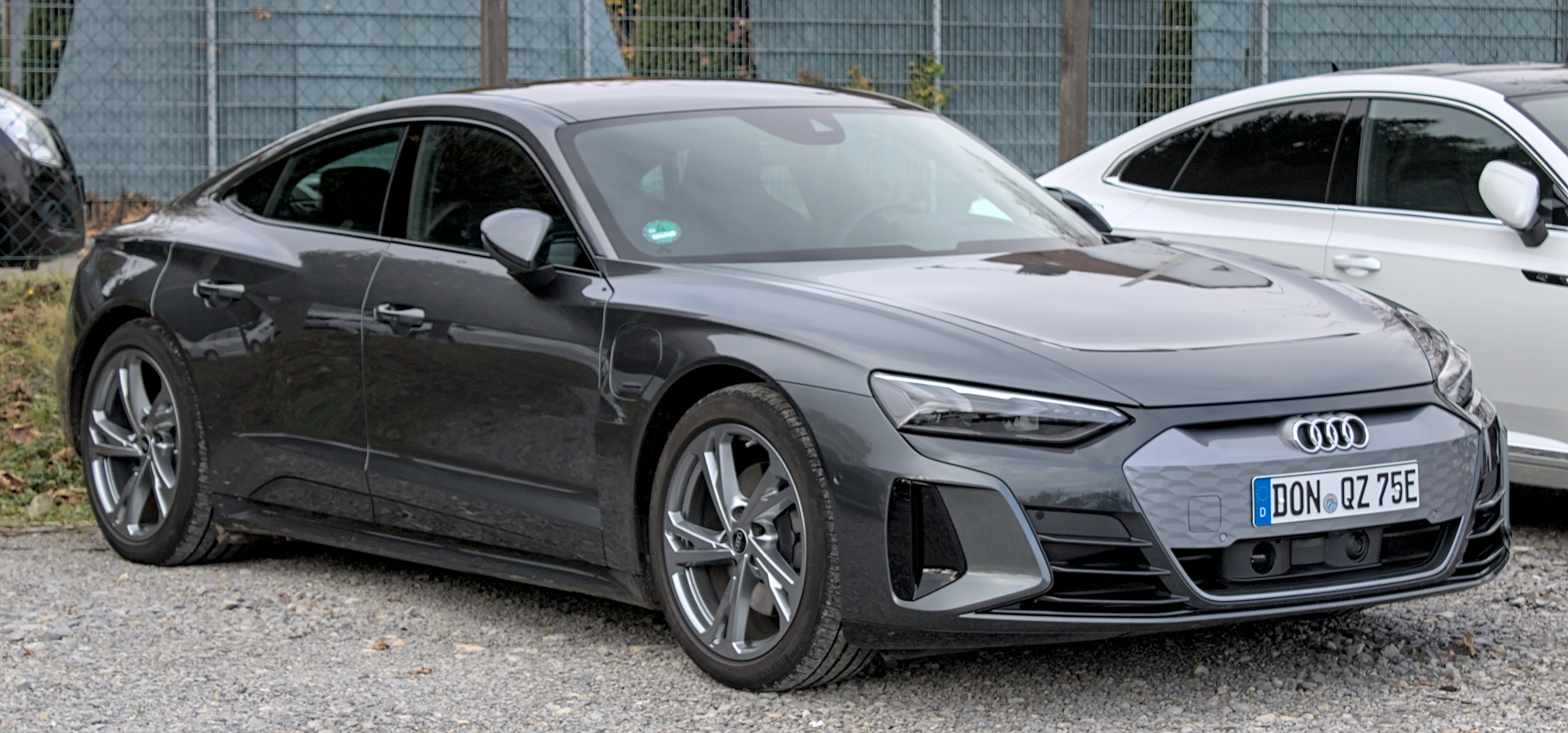
- Audi e-tron GT

Overview
- Manufacturer: Audi
- Production: December 2020–present
- Model years: 2021–present
- Assembly: Germany: Heilbronn (Audi Böllinger Höfe)
- Designer: Parys Cybulski, Lucia Lee (exterior); Markus Däsch, Alexander Hesse (interior)

Body and chassis
- Class: Executive car (E)
- Body style: 4-door sedan/saloon
- Layout: Dual-motor, all-wheel drive
- Platform: J1
- Related: Porsche Taycan

Powertrain
- Engine: 2× AC synchronous electric motors, front and rear axle powered by e-tron
- Power output: Maximum 475 kW (646 PS; 637 hp)
- Transmission: 1-speed direct drive (front axle); 2-speed gearbox (rear axle)
- Battery: 93.4 kWh (84 kWh usable) liquid-cooled lithium-ion
- Electric range: 425 km (264.1 mi)
- Plug-in charging: 270 kW (800 volt) DC

Dimensions
- Wheelbase: 2,900 mm (114.2 in)
- Length: 4,990 mm (196.5 in)
- Width: 1,960 mm (77.2 in)
- Height: 1,410 mm (55.5 in)
- Kerb weight: 2,200 kg (4,850.2 lb)

The Audi e-tron GT is a battery electric executive car produced by Audi since late 2020 as part of the e-tron battery electric sub-brand, and the third fully electric car model, after Q8 e-tron and Q8 e-tron Sportback SUVs. It is also Audi's first full-sized electric sedan, and the RS e-tron GT, put on the market in 2021 is, in terms of 0–100 km/h (0–62 mph) times, the fastest Audi sedan to date. Based on the J1 platform shared with the Porsche Taycan, the car went on sale in March 2021.

== Overview ==
=== e-tron GT concept (2018) ===
The Audi e-tron GT concept prototype was unveiled in November 2018 at the Los Angeles Auto Show, followed by the 2019 Geneva Motor Show.

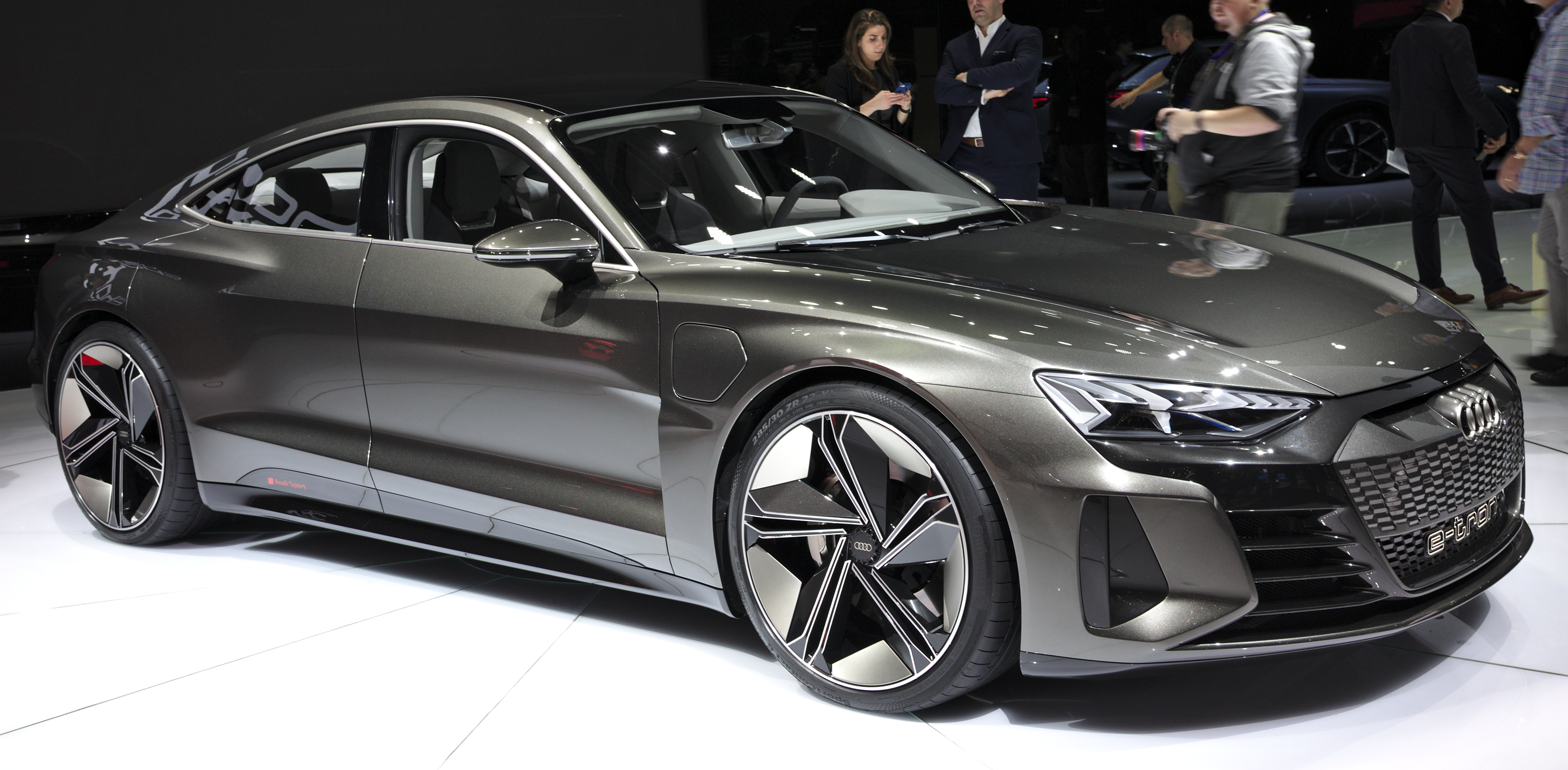
Audi e-tron GT concept

=== e-tron GT quattro ===
In November 2020, Audi released photographs of what was basically the production model, in a characteristic black and gray veneer with orange accents and overlays on the alloy wheels. The production Audi e-tron GT extensively recreated the design of the concept car, with muscular wheel arches, aggressively styled headlights, and a large hexagonal radiator grille imitation. The gently sloping roofline ends with one-piece taillights connected by a luminous strip. Unlike the concept, the production car has visible door handles.

The car shares technical components with the related Porsche Taycan. 40 percent of its parts are identical to those used in the Taycan, and the cars share the same platform. Like the Taycan, it is a 4-door sedan despite the sporty coupé-style silhouette.

The vehicle was unveiled in the 2021 International Motor Show Germany.

Pre-order of European models began in mid-February 2021, and went on sale on 3 May 2021.

The fully electric driveline of the Audi e-tron GT is powered by an 84 kWh battery net capacity, (93.4 kWh gross) with two electric motors providing all-wheel drive. The vehicle accelerates from 0–100 km/h (0–62 mph) in 4.1 seconds, reaches a top speed of 245 km/h (152 mph) and has a maximum sustained power output of 350 kW (469 hp), which can be temporarily boosted to 390 kW (523 hp).

The official EPA range of the vehicle on a single charge is 383 km (238 mi). In tests performed by the automotive website Edmunds, the car surpassed its EPA rating, achieving 439 km (273 mi).

The 93,4 kWh battery charges up to 100% in 540 minutes (AC 3-phase wall box/charging station 11.0 kW) and 80% in 29 minutes (DC charging station 135.0 kW).

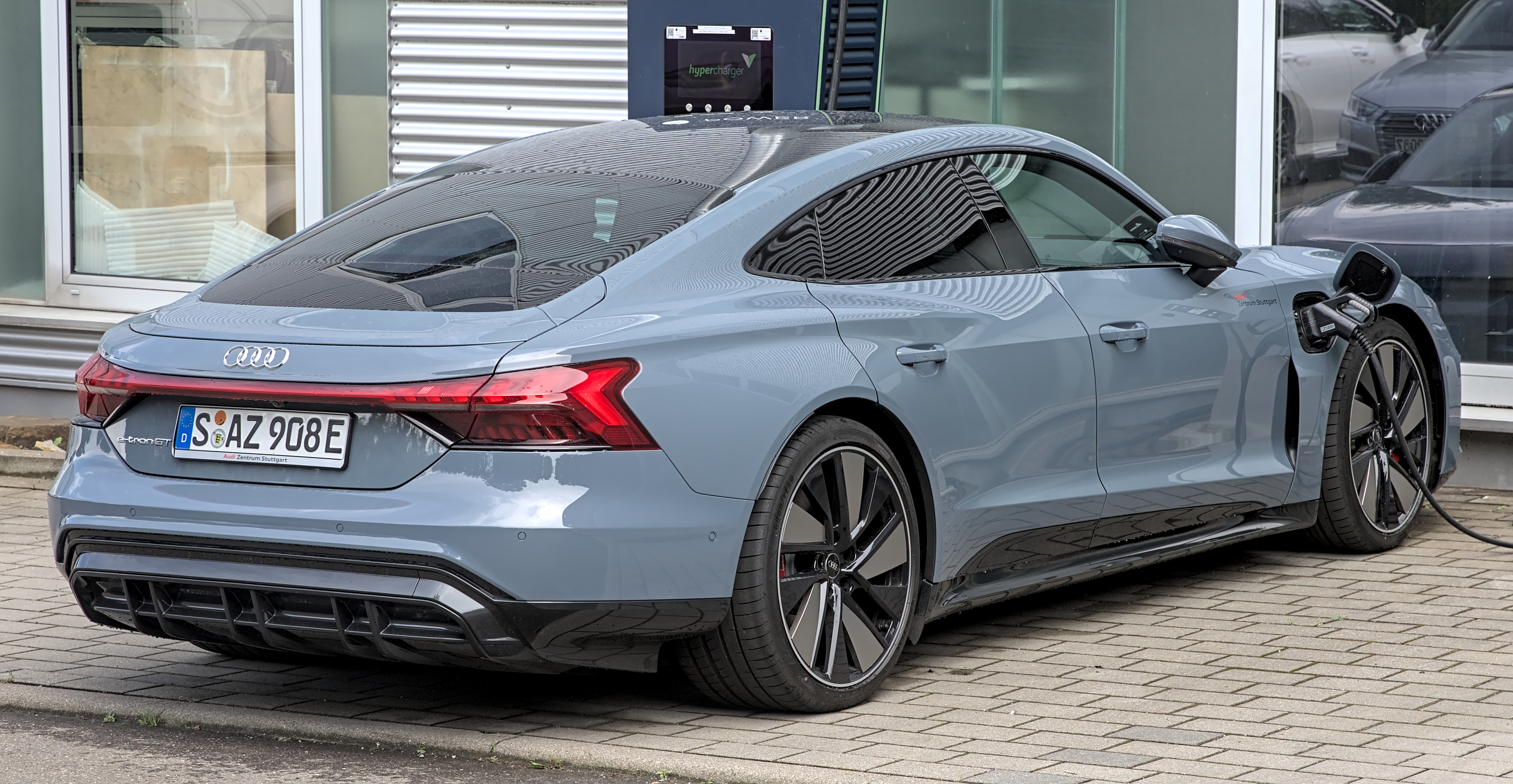
Rear view

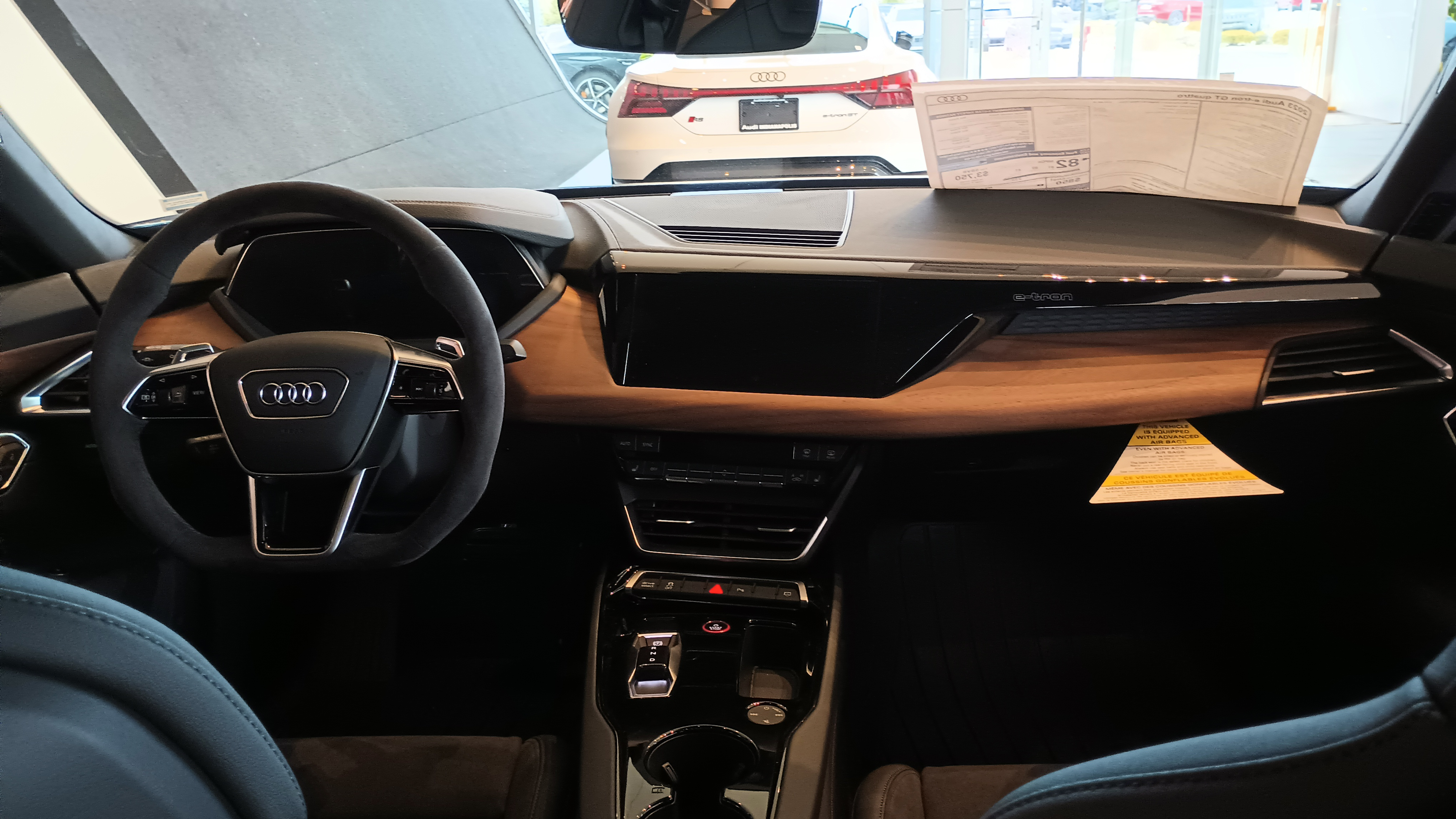
Interior

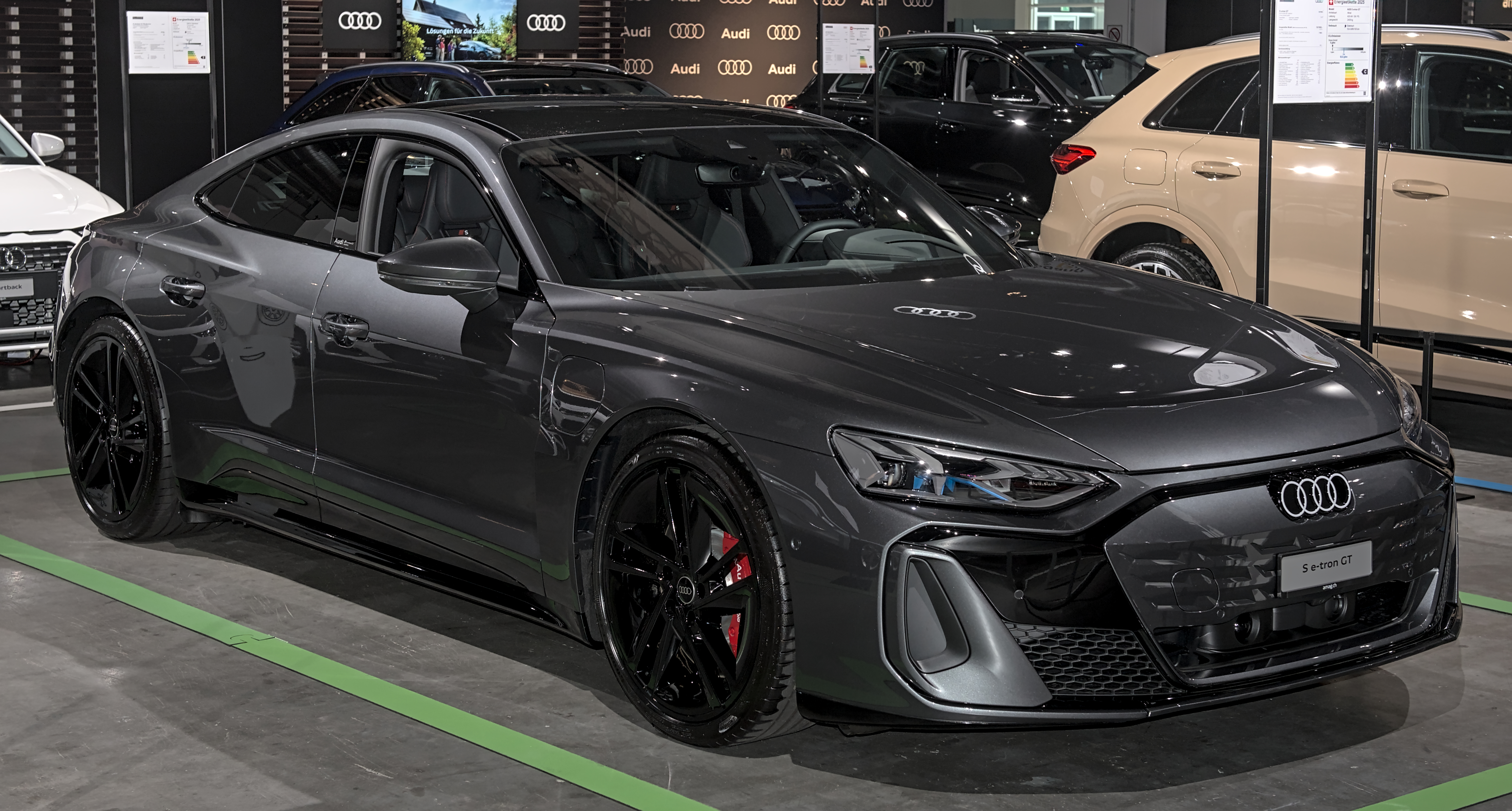
Facelift

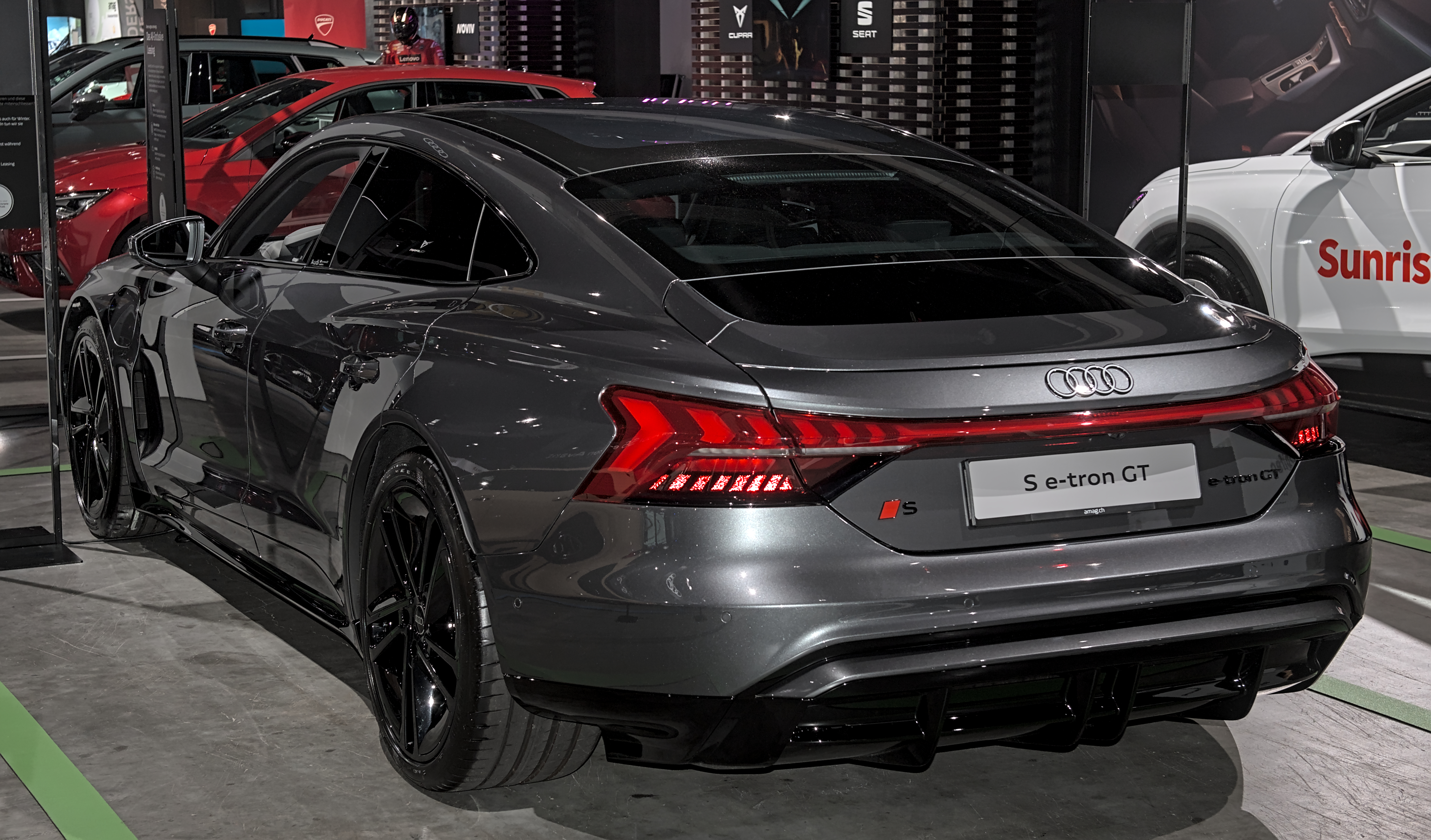
Rear view

=== RS e-tron GT (2021–) ===
Audi has also introduced a more sporty RS version which accelerates from 0–100 km/h (0–62 mph) in 3.3 seconds, reaches a top speed of 250 km/h (155 mph) and has a power output of 440 kW (590 hp) that is temporarily raised to 475 kW (637 hp) when boost mode is selected.

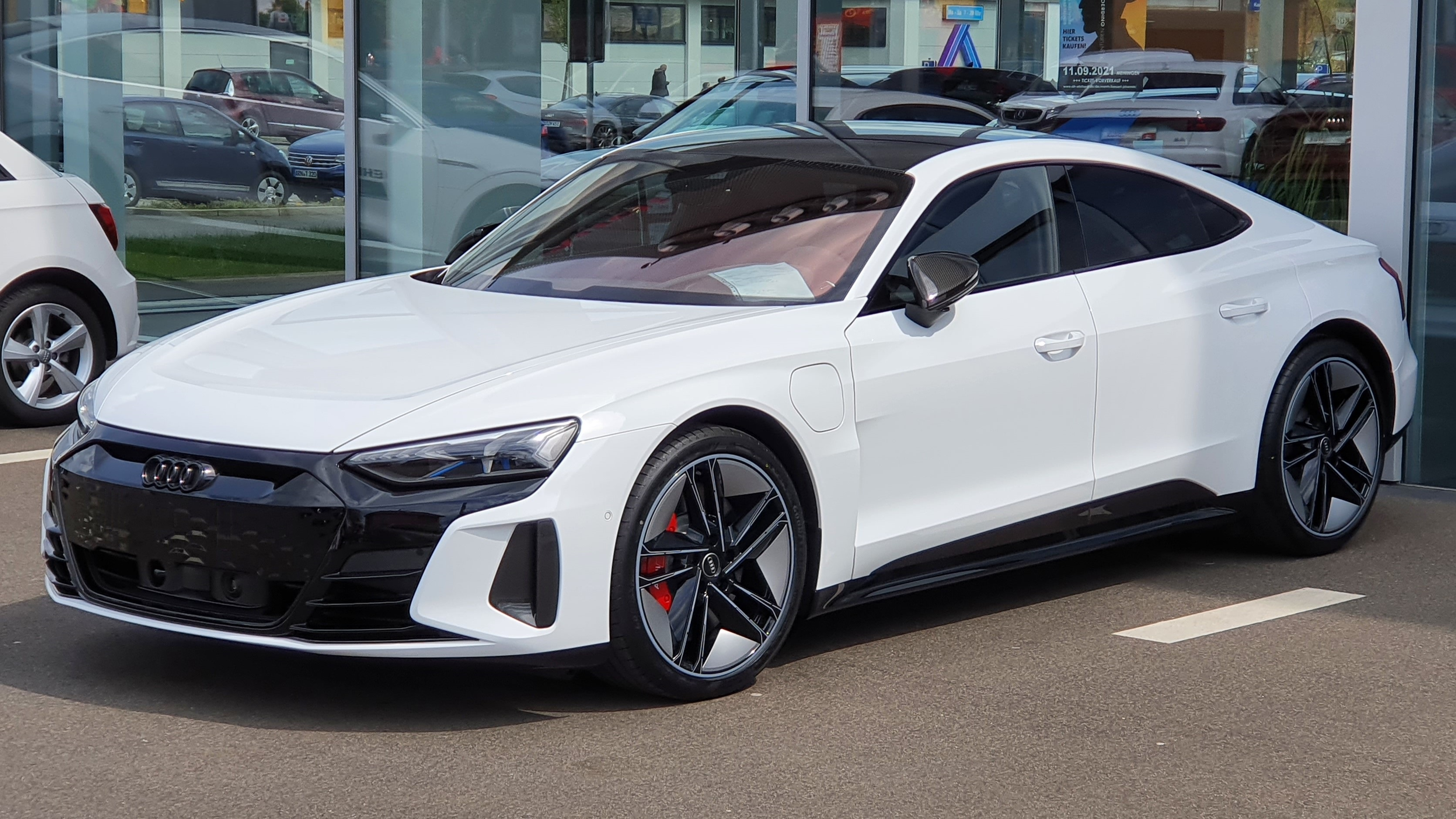
Audi RS e-tron GT quattro (front)

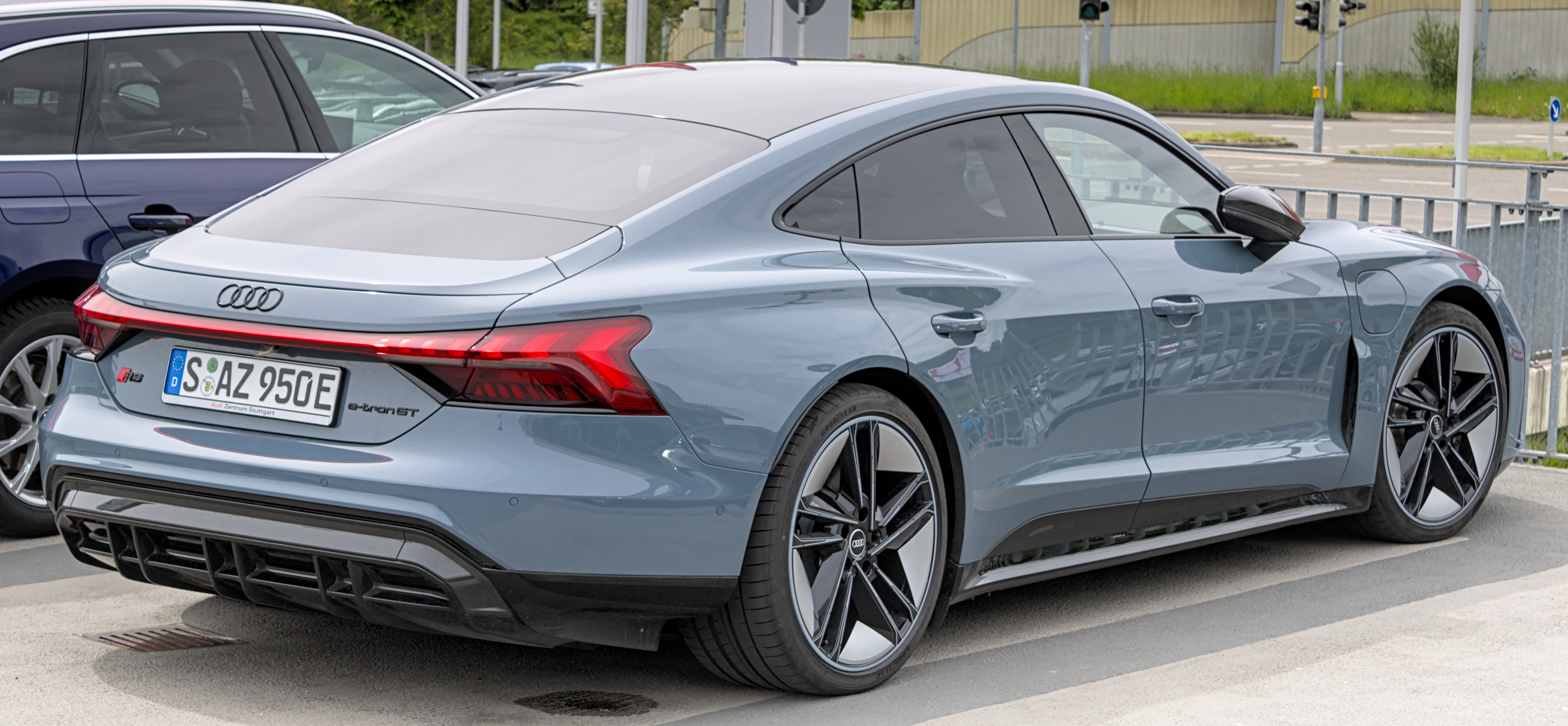
Audi RS e-tron GT quattro (rear)

==== RS e-tron GT Project_513/2 (2023) ====
Unveiled in March 2023, the Audi RS E-tron GT Project_513/2 is a special edition for the US market limited to 75 units, with its design taking inspiration from a prototype and featuring red accents and an e-tron camouflage script.

== Production ==
Preparation of production at Böllinger Höfe plant started in 2019, and started in December 2020. Unlike the e-tron and e-tron Sportback models manufactured in Belgium, it is the first Audi electric car to be produced in Audi's home country Germany, at the Heilbronn plant. Audi officially unveiled the production e-tron GT on 9 February 2021 with sales started in March 2021.

== Reviews and reception ==
In December 2022, Bloomberg suggested the e-tron GT as good option for those consumers upset by Elon Musk's behavior who would instead consider the Model S by Tesla.

== Awards ==
Audi e-tron GT won 2021 Goldenes Lenkrad (Golden Steering Wheel) awards under the Most Beautiful Car of the Year category.

== Marketing ==
In the 2019 superhero film Avengers: Endgame, Tony Stark drove a black Audi e-tron GT. At the time of filming, the car was still a concept and Marvel Studios commissioned Audi to manufacture a prototype specifically for the film. For this prototype, Audi developed a digitally-generated sound for the car, as the filmmakers requested that the car needed to make a sound to support the drama of the scene it appeared in. Robert Downey Jr., who plays Tony Stark, also drove the prototype to the film's premiere.

As part of Audi's sponsorship of Spider-Man: Far From Home, the Audi e-tron GT concept appeared in a short film titled 'Science Fair', where Peter Parker (Tom Holland) tried to save his school science fair presentation with the help of an Audi e-tron GT concept.

As part of the Audi e-Tron GT launch in Hong Kong, Ian Chan of Mirror became an e-tron brand representative in Hong Kong, and the first Hong Kong artist to own an Audi e-Tron GT.

As part of the general Audi e-Tron GT launch, fashion designer Stella McCartney, actor and producer Tom Hardy, and singer Janelle Monáe became product representatives. The slogan 'Future is an Attitude' was also used in the campaign.

As part of the Audi RS e-tron GT launch in China, Audi Channel is presenting a movie-level live broadcast, and is jointly presented by Audi Yingjie Electric Power Pioneer and Audi e-tron GT Global Ambassador Nicholas Tse, Audi Yingjie Speedy Pioneer Han Han, and Sustainable Development Entrepreneur and F1 World Champion Nico Rosberg.

== Sales ==
Year	US
2022	2,275
2023	3,202
2024	2,894
2025	1,195

== See also ==
- Audi e-tron
