= Volkswagen Group D platform =

Overview
- Manufacturer: Volkswagen Group
- Production: 1988–2019

Body and chassis
- Layout: Longitudinal Front-engine, front-wheel-drive (Audi); Longitudinal Front-engine, rear-wheel-drive (Porsche Panamera G1); Longitudinal Front-engine, all-wheel-drive (D1 (VW Phaeton/Bentley) / Audi)

Chronology
- Successor: MLB platform (Longitudinal Front-engine, front-wheel-drive/four-wheel-drive); MSB platform (Longitudinal Front-engine, rear-wheel-drive/four-wheel-drive)

The Volkswagen Group D platform is a series of automobile platforms from the German concern Volkswagen Group. It has been used for large luxury automobiles. Originally used by the Audi marque, it is also latterly used by the Volkswagen Passenger Cars, and Bentley marques.

== D1/D11 ==
The D1 (also known as the D11) platform was based on a stretched version of the Volkswagen Group C3/C4 platform:

- Audi V8 (Typ 44) (1988–1991)
- Audi V8 (Typ 4C) (1991–1994)

== D2 ==
The D2 platform is an all aluminium monocoque, based on space frame principles, which helped to significantly reduce weight without being any less rigid. Audi AG refers to this type of construction as the "Audi Space Frame" (ASF). It is technically the first 'original' D platform.

- Audi A8 (1994–2003)
- Audi S8 (1996–2003)

== D3 ==
The D3 platform, also employing an aluminium space frame, was used for the second generation Audi A8, A8L, and S8.

- Audi A8 (2003–2010)
- Audi S8 (2006–2010)

=== D1 (VW Phaeton/Bentley) ===
The D1 platform cars (not to be confused with the earlier Audi V8 platform) share some components with the D3 platform, but have conventional steel bodyshell construction.

- Bentley Continental GT (Typ 3W, 2004–2018)
- Bentley Flying Spur (Typ 3W, 2005–2019)
- Volkswagen Phaeton (Typ 3D, 2003–2016)

== D4 ==
The third generation Audi A8 launched in 2009 is sometimes referred to as the "D4" generation A8. This model combines an aluminium Audi Space Frame (ASF) structure but no longer uses the D platform, but the Audi-developed MLB component matrix.

== D5 ==
The Fourth generation Audi A8 launched in 2018 is sometimes referred to as the "D5" generation A8. This model combines an aluminium Audi Space Frame (ASF) structure but no longer uses the D platform, but the Audi-developed MLB Evo.
