= Volkswagen Group New Small Family platform =

The Volkswagen Group New Small Family platform (NSF) (also known as Typ AA or PQ12 platform) is a range of ultra-compact city cars manufactured by Volkswagen Group launched in late 2011, based on the Volkswagen up! concept cars shown at 2007's Frankfurt and Tokyo motor shows. Although the up! concept car had a rear-engine design, the NSF's platform is front-engined in order to reduce investment costs. The range consists of a short wheelbase three-door hatchback and a five-door version. A hybrid version, as well as a subcompact crossover SUV, were touted to join the range but never did. The NSF Platform was offered with electric powertrains as E-Up, Citigo-e iQ and Mii Electric.

The cars were built in Slovakia at the Group's Devínska Nová Ves plant near Bratislava. Volkswagen Group planned to invest 308 million euros (about $398.56 million) in upgrading the plant for the project. NSF-based cars were badged as Volkswagen, SEAT and Škoda, a technique known as badge engineering. it has also been reported that Audi planned a version of the NSF, tentatively named E1, with a distinctively-styled body and interior as well as a planned unique 600cc 2 cylinder engine.

Volkswagen Group expected to build 4.5 million NSF cars in the model's anticipated nine-year life, however production continued for twelve years.

All models went out of production by the end of 2023, with the last one being the Volkswagen Up.

== NSF-based models ==
=== Discontinued ===
- Volkswagen up!
- SEAT Mii
- Škoda Citigo
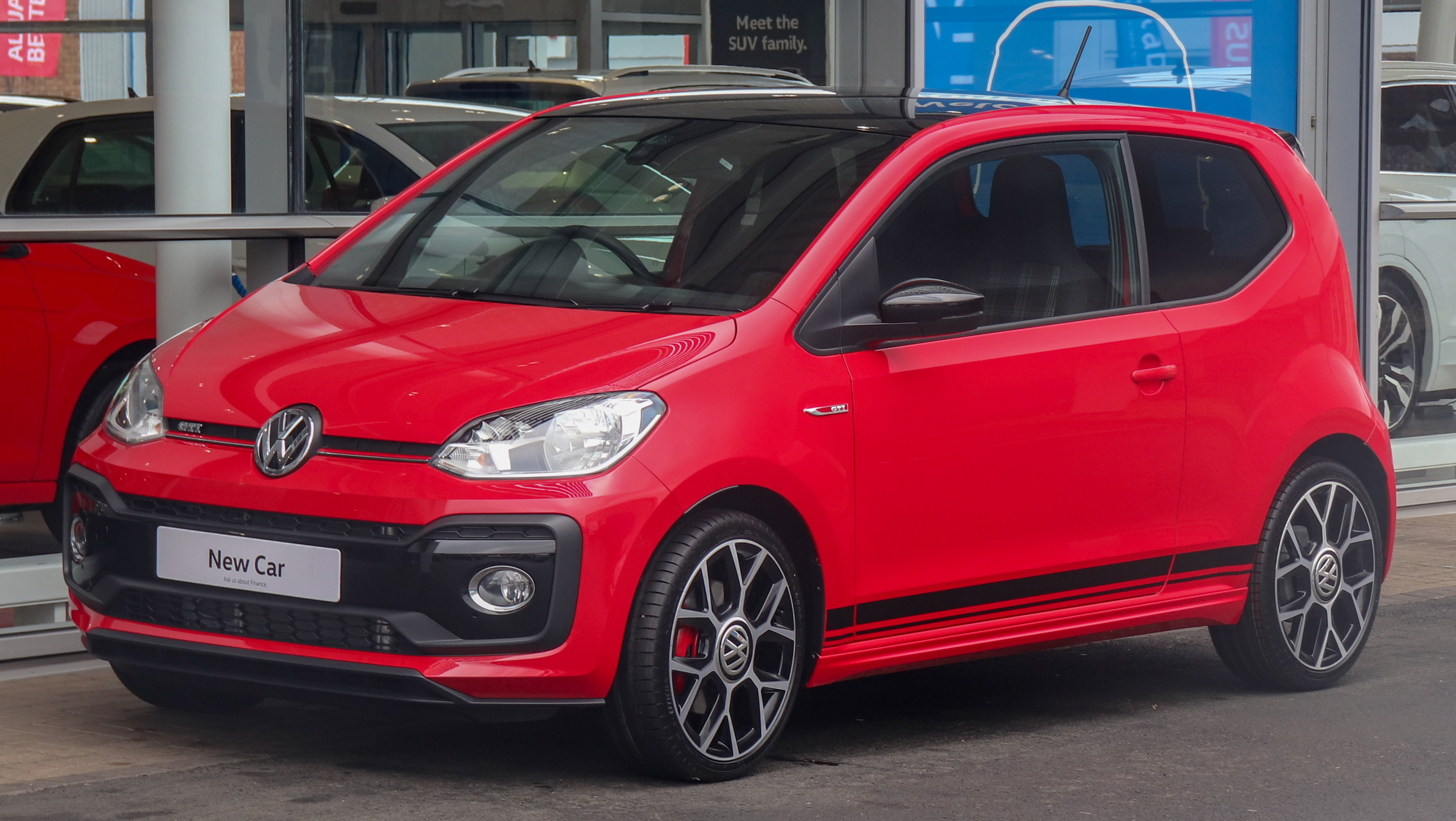
Volkswagen up!

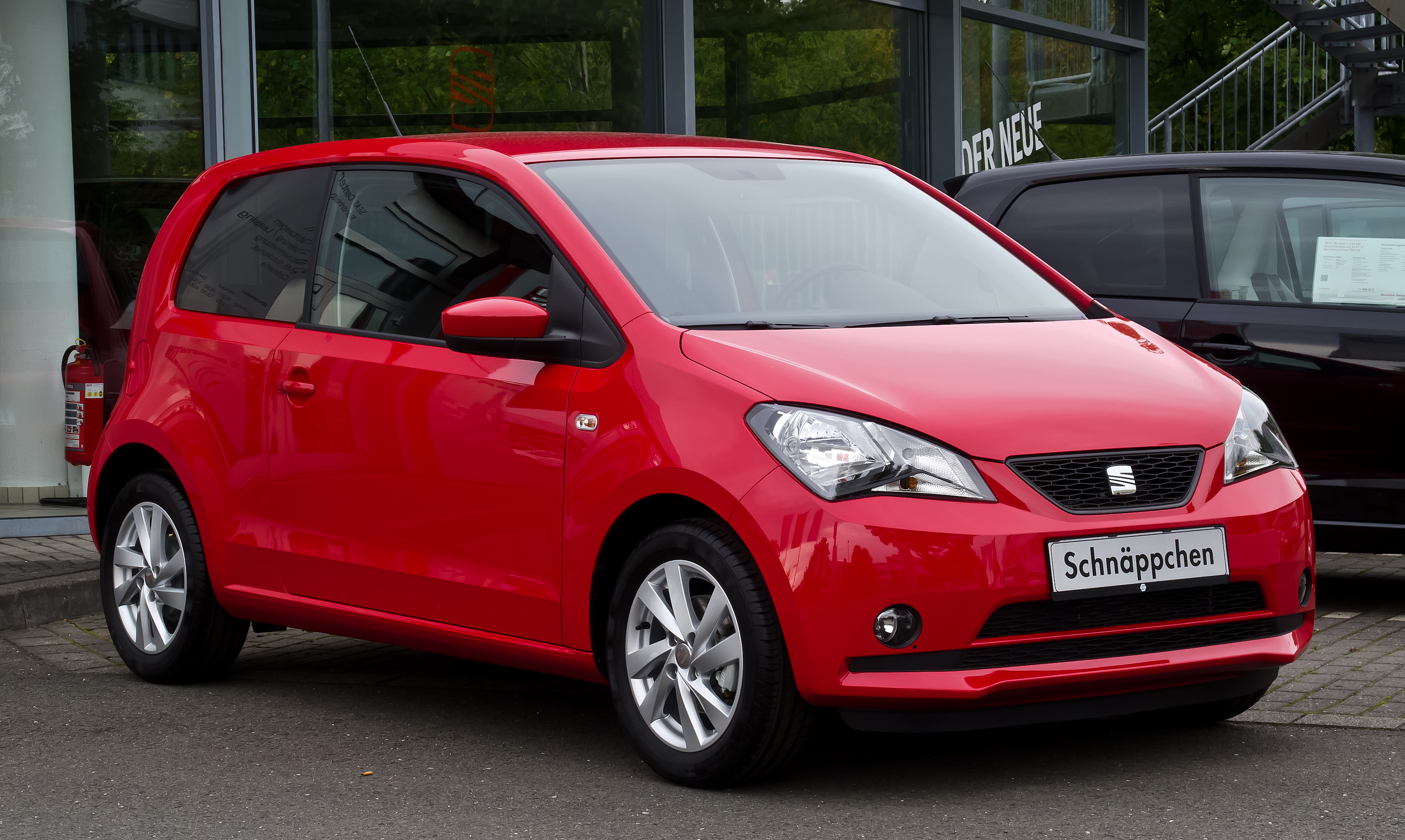
SEAT Mii

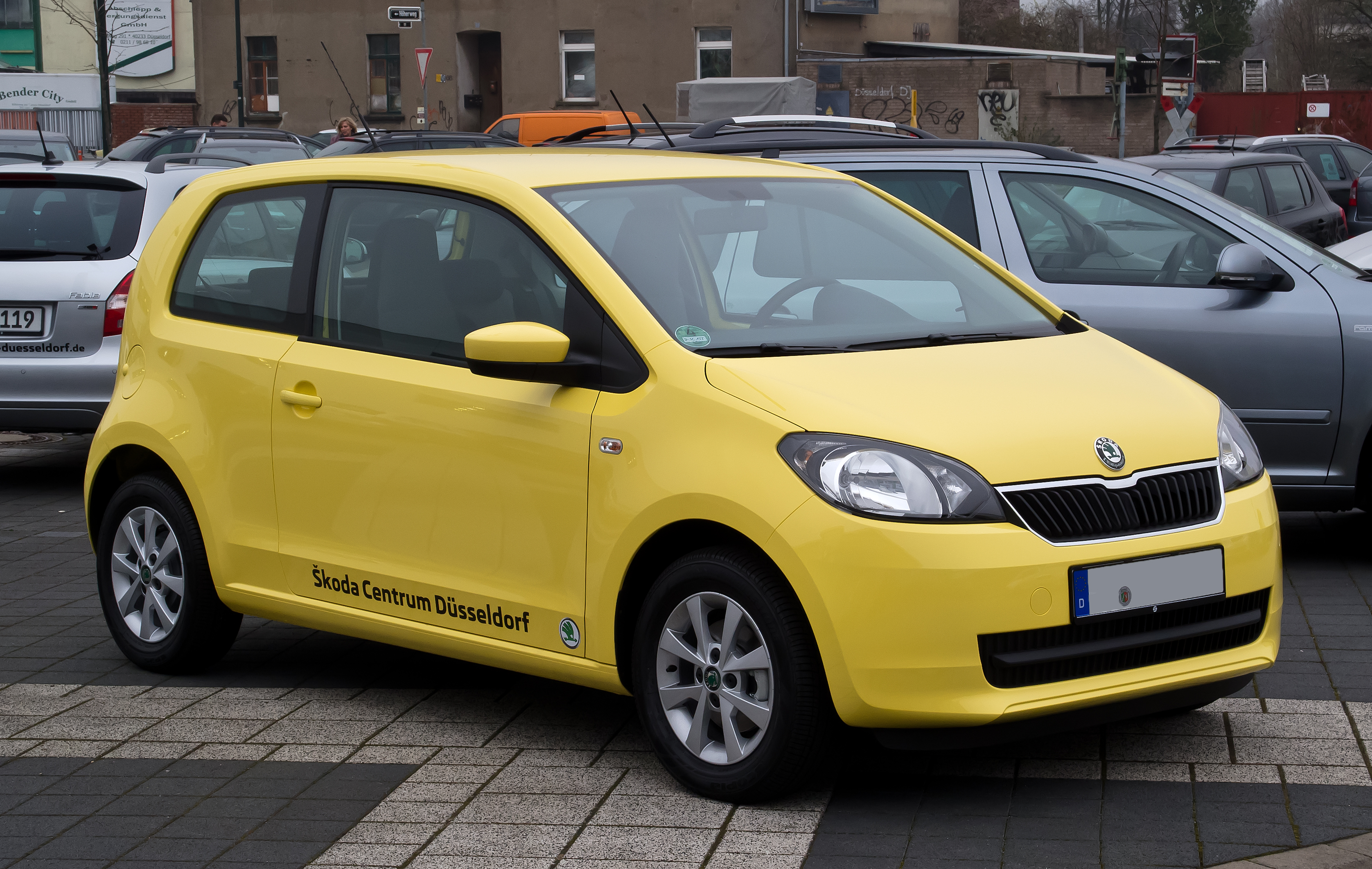
Škoda Citigo

=== Cancelled ===
- Volkswagen Taigun (2016)

== See also ==
- Volkswagen Group MQB platform
- Volkswagen Group MLB platform
- Volkswagen Group MSB platform
- Volkswagen Group MEB platform
- List of Volkswagen Group platforms
