= Volkswagen C Coupe GTE =

Overview
- Manufacturer: Volkswagen

Body and chassis
- Class: Executive car (E)
- Body style: 4-door saloon
- Layout: FF
- Platform: MLB
- Related: Audi A6L e-tron (2012)

Powertrain
- Engine: 2.0L turbocharged I4 plus electric motor
- Transmission: 8-sp automatic
- Propulsion: PHEV

Dimensions
- Wheelbase: 3,001 mm (118.1 in)
- Length: 5,072 mm (199.7 in)
- Width: 1,930 mm (76.0 in)
- Height: 1,445 mm (56.9 in)

Chronology
- Successor: Volkswagen Phideon GTE

The Volkswagen C Coupe GTE is a concept automobile first shown in April 2015 at Auto Shanghai. The four-door saloon is a plug-in hybrid, powered by a 2.0L turbocharged gasoline engine coupled with an electric motor, and was intended to preview an upcoming car for the Chinese market, positioned between the Passat and the Phaeton models. An updated version of the C Coupe GTE has been produced by SAIC Volkswagen and sold exclusively in China as the Phideon starting in July 2016.

== Design ==
Klaus Bischoff, head of design for Volkswagen, stated the C Coupe GTE "very clearly shows the new 'face' of top Volkswagen sedans for the first time" with themes that would be used for future Volkswagen premium sedans, including sharp edges and horizontal lines to emphasize the car's length and width. Walter de Silva added "The new rear-end design that is oriented to the classic two-door 'coupé' has given [sedans] more personality. The Volkswagen designers have integrated this stylistic element into the very dynamic design of the C Coupé GTE saloon; they have developed a striking front end and given the vehicle its own authentic character. They have created a model that appeals to Chinese customers, who always follow the trends of European car design with great interest."

The concept C Coupe GTE was painted gold in a finish named "Golden Atmosphere" as a nod to its intended Chinese market; there were no plans to market the car in Europe or America.

== Performance ==
According to Volkswagen, the drivetrain of the C Coupe GTE has a combined output of 242 hp (180 kW; 245 PS) and 369 lb⋅ft (500 N⋅m) from its 2.0L turbocharged straight engine, rated at 207 hp (154 kW; 210 PS) and 258 lb⋅ft (350 N⋅m) alone, coupled to an electric motor rated at 91 kW (122 hp; 124 PS) and 162 lb⋅ft (220 N⋅m) alone. The lithium-ion battery has a capacity of 14.1 kW-hr, and the car is capable of traveling up to 31 mi (50 km) on battery power alone at speeds limited to 81 mph (130 km/h) or less. The drivetrain is largely identical to the Audi A6L e-tron.

Fuel consumption is rated at 2.3 L/100 km (102 mpg_{‑US}), according to New European Driving Cycle methodology.

== Production ==
The Volkswagen Phideon was introduced at Geneva in March 2016, and went on sale in China later that year, using conventional (gasoline-only) powertrains, although a plug-in hybrid variant was anticipated. The styling and dimensions of the Phideon closely followed the C Coupe GTE.

== See also ==
The 2015 series of Volkswagen GTE concept cars, including:

- Volkswagen Cross Coupe GTE Concept (debuted at Detroit, Jan 2015)
- Volkswagen Sport Coupe Concept GTE (debuted at Geneva, Mar 2015)
