= Volkswagen Group MLB platform =

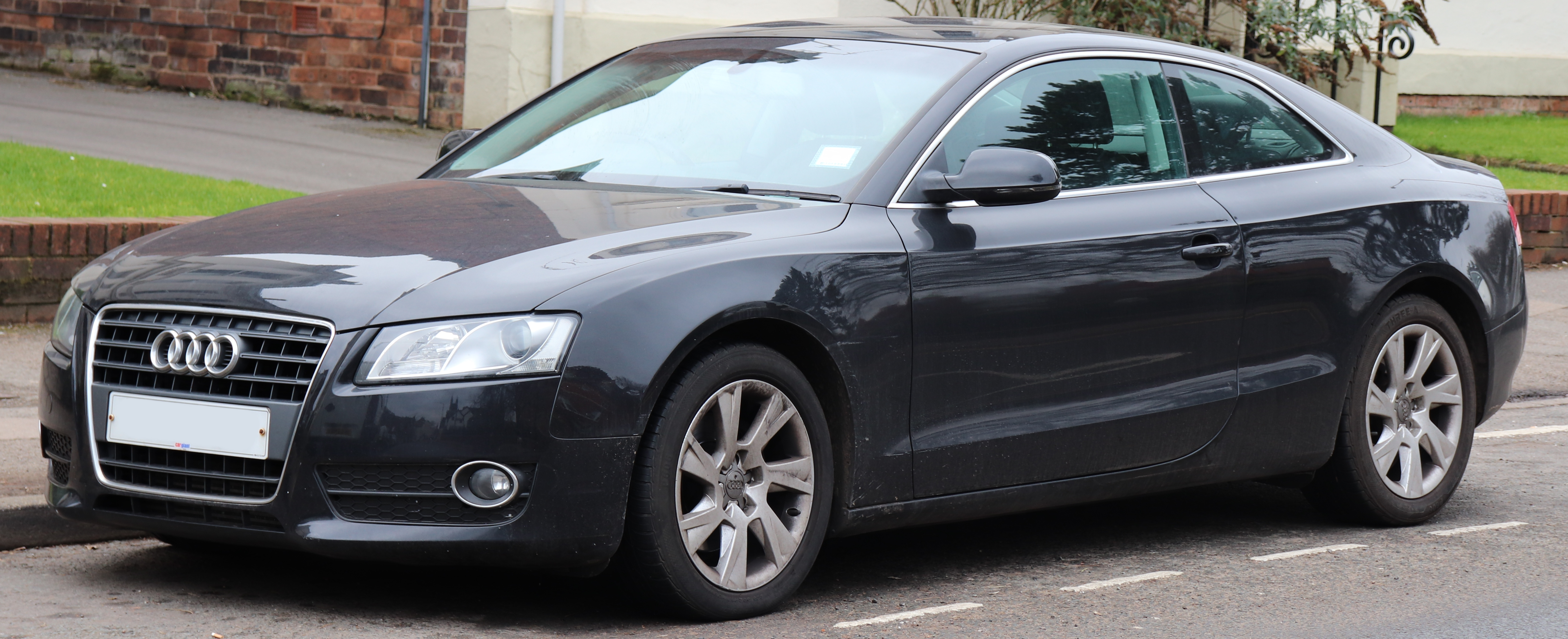
- The first generation Audi A5 was the first vehicle to ride on this platform.

Overview
- Manufacturer: Volkswagen Group
- Production: 2007–present

Body and chassis
- Layout: Longitudinal front-engine, front-wheel-drive; Longitudinal front-engine, all-wheel-drive
- Related: A platform MQB platform PPE platform

Chronology
- Predecessor: B platform C platform D platform E platform
- Successor: Premium Platform Combustion (for MLB Evo B, C/D platform)

The Volkswagen Group MLB platform is the company's platform strategy, announced in 2012, for shared modular construction of its longitudinal, front-engined automobiles.

It was developed by Audi and first introduced in 2007 on the Audi A5 then, chronologically, on the Audi A4, Audi Q5, Audi A8, Audi A7, Audi A6, Porsche Macan and the second generation Audi Q7 (MLB Evo). Until 2015, only Audi and Porsche were using the MLB platform. In February 2016, Volkswagen introduced the MLB based Phideon luxury sedan built and sold uniquely in the Chinese market.

Volkswagen Group markets the strategy under the code name MLB, which stands for Modularer Längsbaukasten, translating from German to "Modular Longitudinal Matrix". MLB is one strategy within VW's overall MB (Modulare Baukasten or modular matrix) program which also includes the similar MQB strategy for its vehicles with transverse engine orientation.

While a model may be said to use an MLB platform, it is not so much a platform per se, but rather a system for introducing rationality across disparate platforms that share engine orientation — regardless of model, vehicle size or brand. Thus, MLB uses a core "matrix" of components across a wide variety of platforms — for example, sharing a common engine-mounting core for all drivetrains (e.g., gasoline, diesel, natural gas, hybrid and purely electric). The only things that are non-variable are the pedal box, firewall, and front wheel placement, as well as the windscreen angle; other than this, the vehicle can be stretched and shaped to fit any body style, size range, or drivetrain required. As well as reducing weight, the concept allows diverse models, including those from the company's various brands, to be manufactured at the same plant, further saving cost. Ulrich Hackenberg, former chief of Volkswagen’s Research and Development, called MB a "strategic weapon."

Jalopnik said "the biggest feature is the uniform position of all motors and transmissions" and that "by fitting all motors into the same place (the company) hope(s) to cut down on engineering costs and weight/complexity when porting the car over to other models." The British magazine, Car, said "the idea heralds a return to basic principles of mass production in an industry where over the last 100 years, complexity has spiralled out of control. By creating a standardised, interchangeable set of parts from which to build a variety of cars, (the company) plans to cut the time taken to build a car by 30%."

== Modularer Längsbaukasten ==
=== MLB B ===
- Audi A5 (Typ 8T/8F), 2007–2016
- Audi A4 (B8) (Typ 8K), 2007–2016
- Audi Q5 (Typ 8R), 2008–2017
- Porsche Macan (Type 95B), 2013–2026
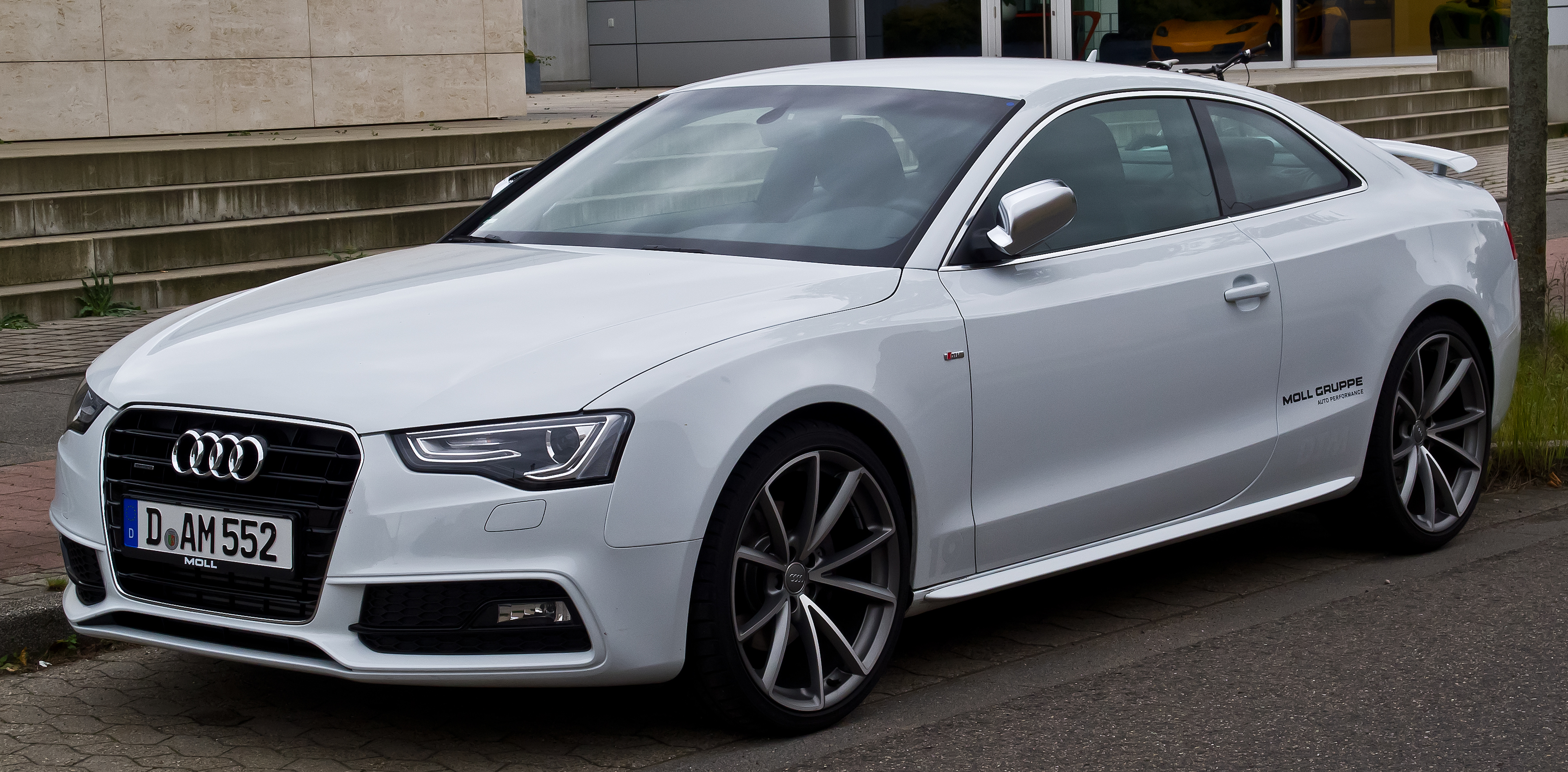
Audi A5 Coupe

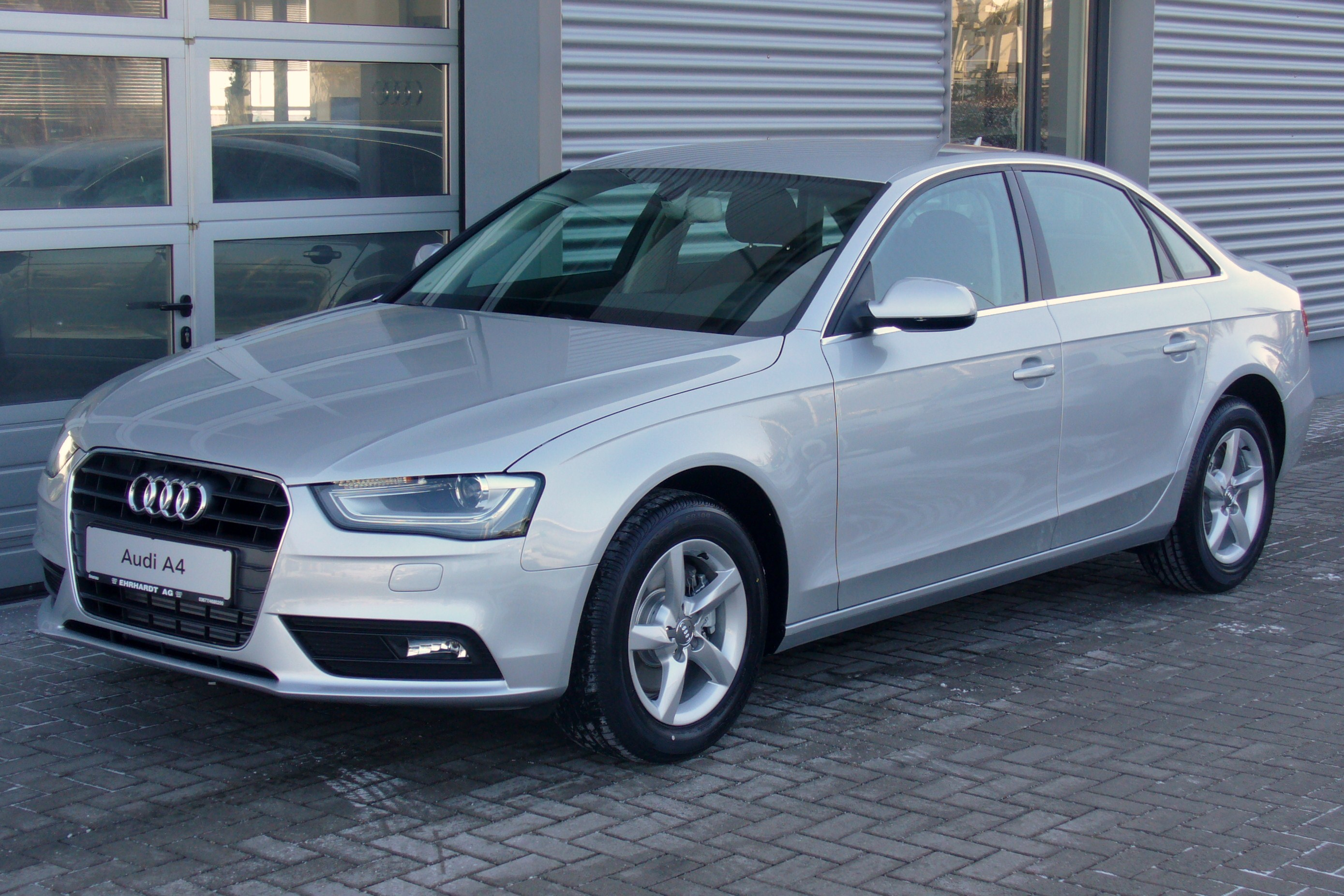
Audi A4

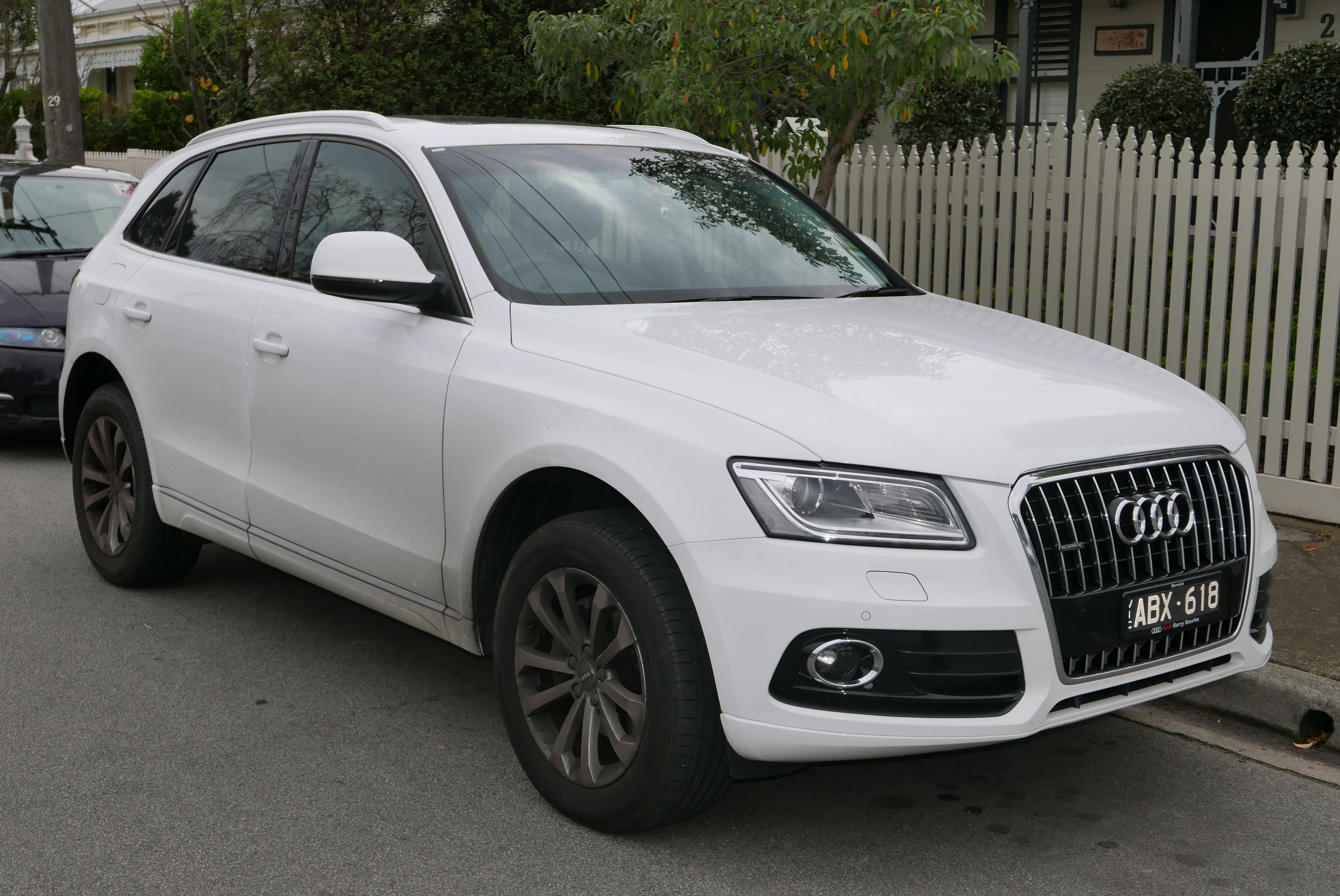
Audi Q5

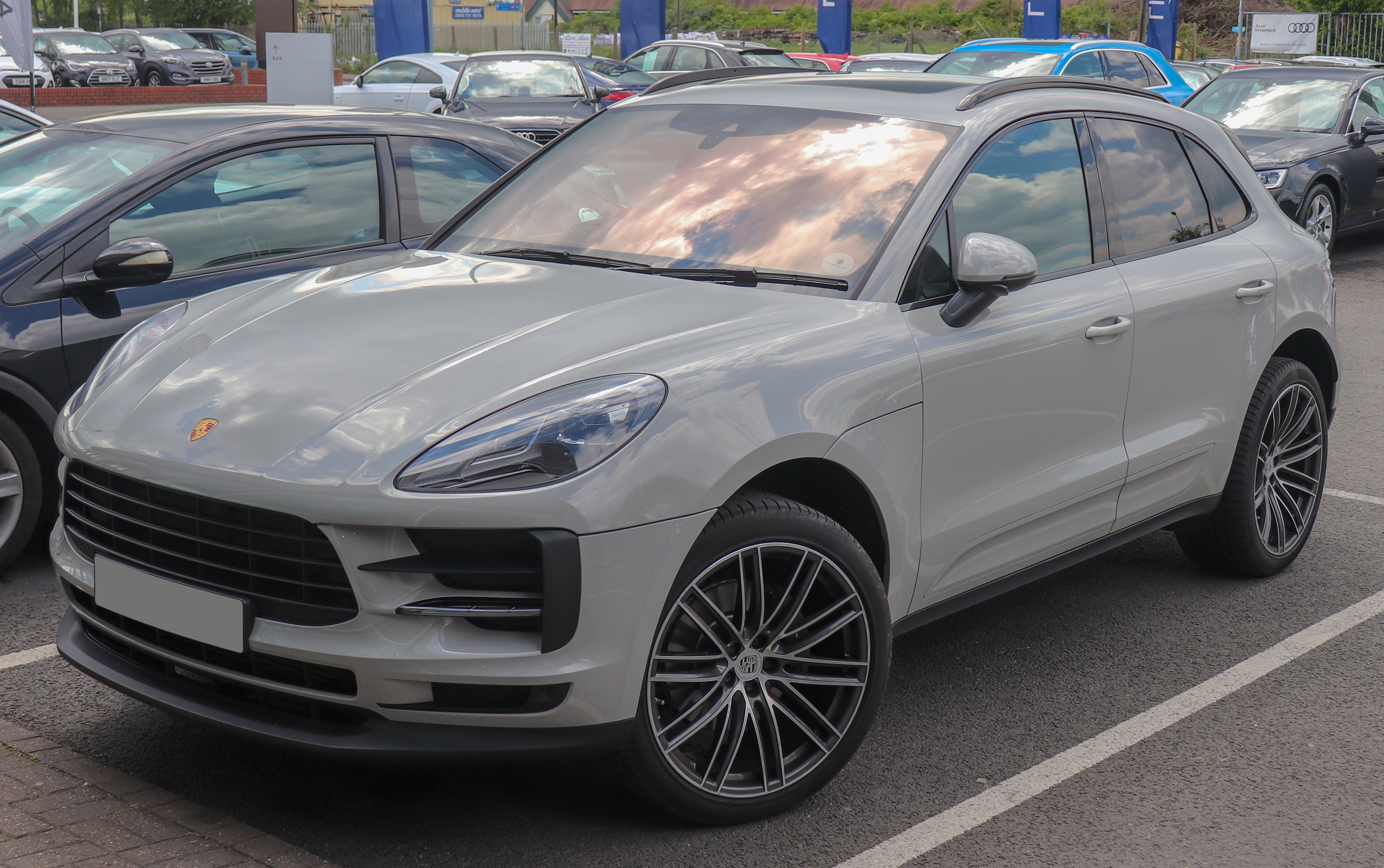
Porsche Macan

=== MLB C/D ===
- Audi A8 (D4) (Typ 4H), 2010–2017
- Audi A7 (Typ 4G), 2010–2017
- Audi A6 (C7) (Typ 4G), 2011–2018
- Volkswagen Phideon (Typ 3E), 2016–2023
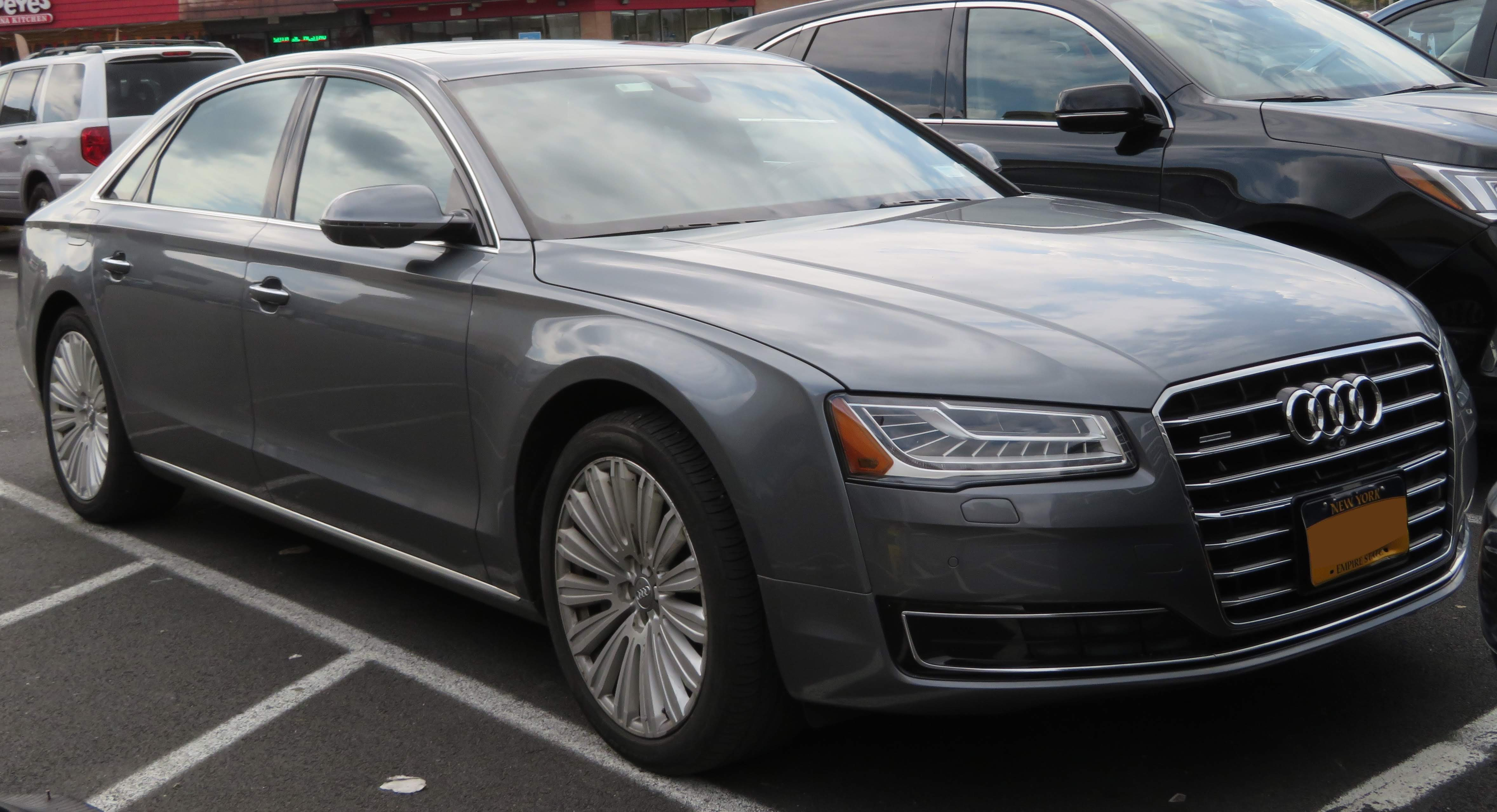
Audi A8

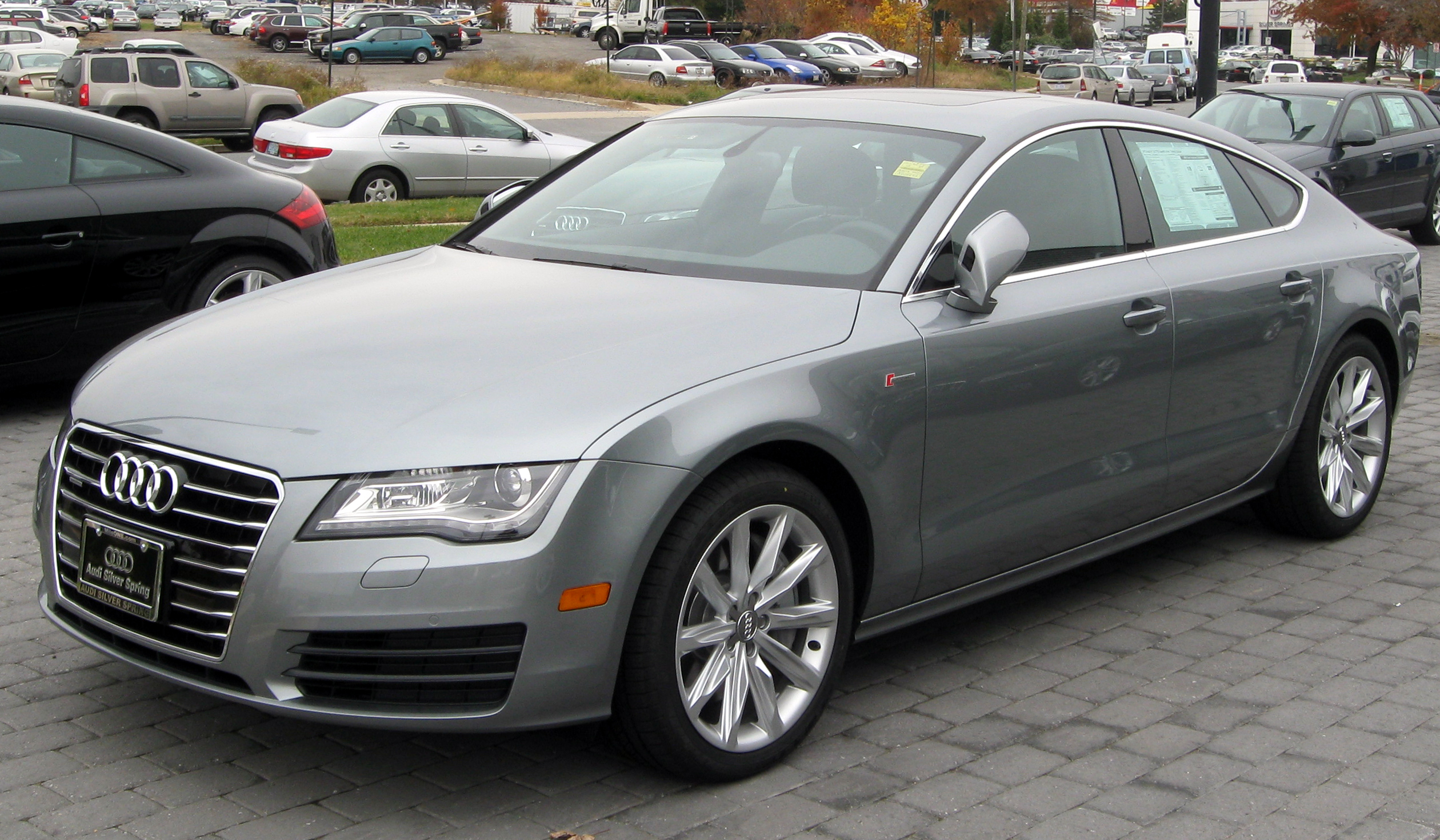
Audi A7

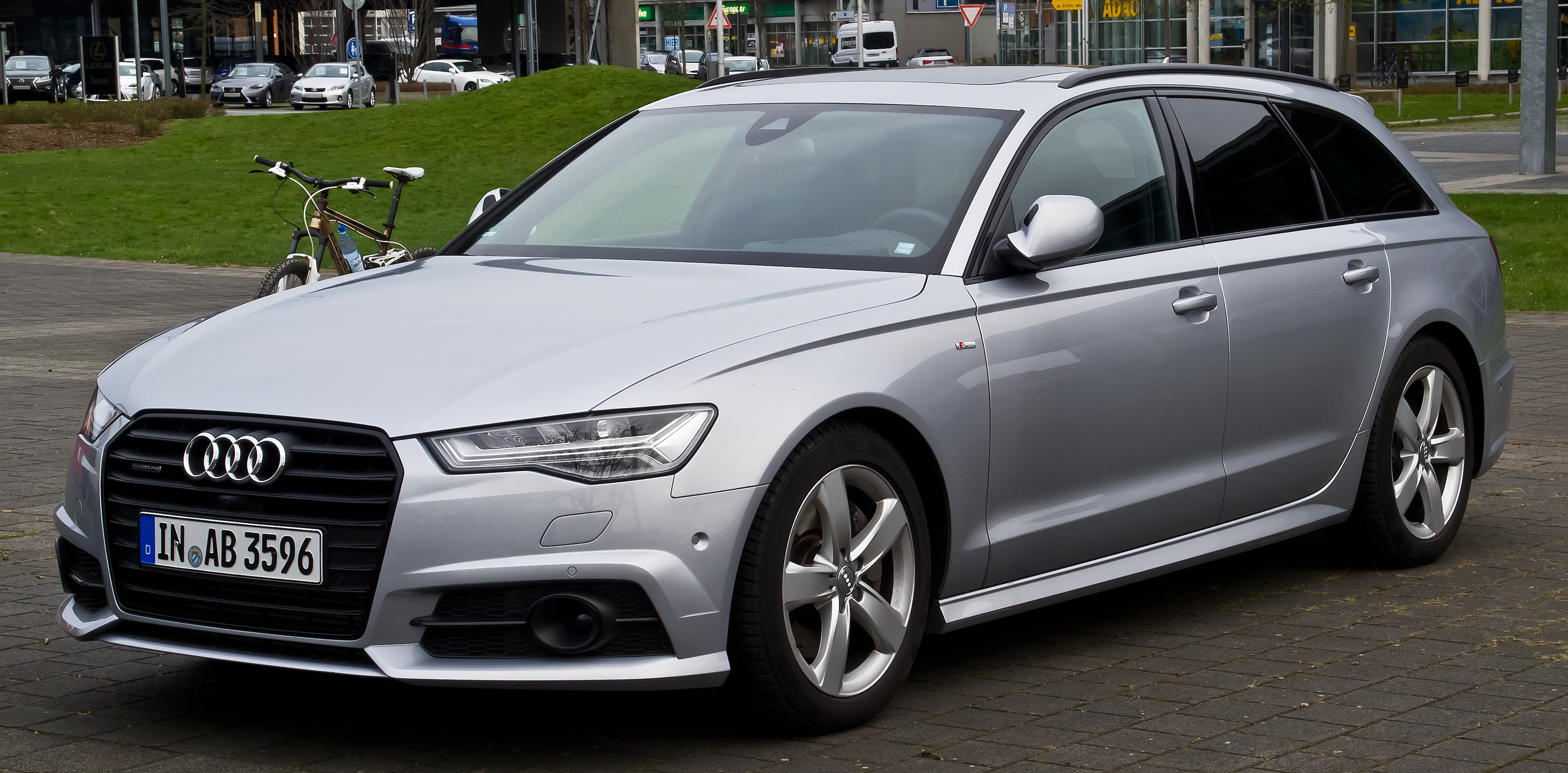
Audi A6 Avant

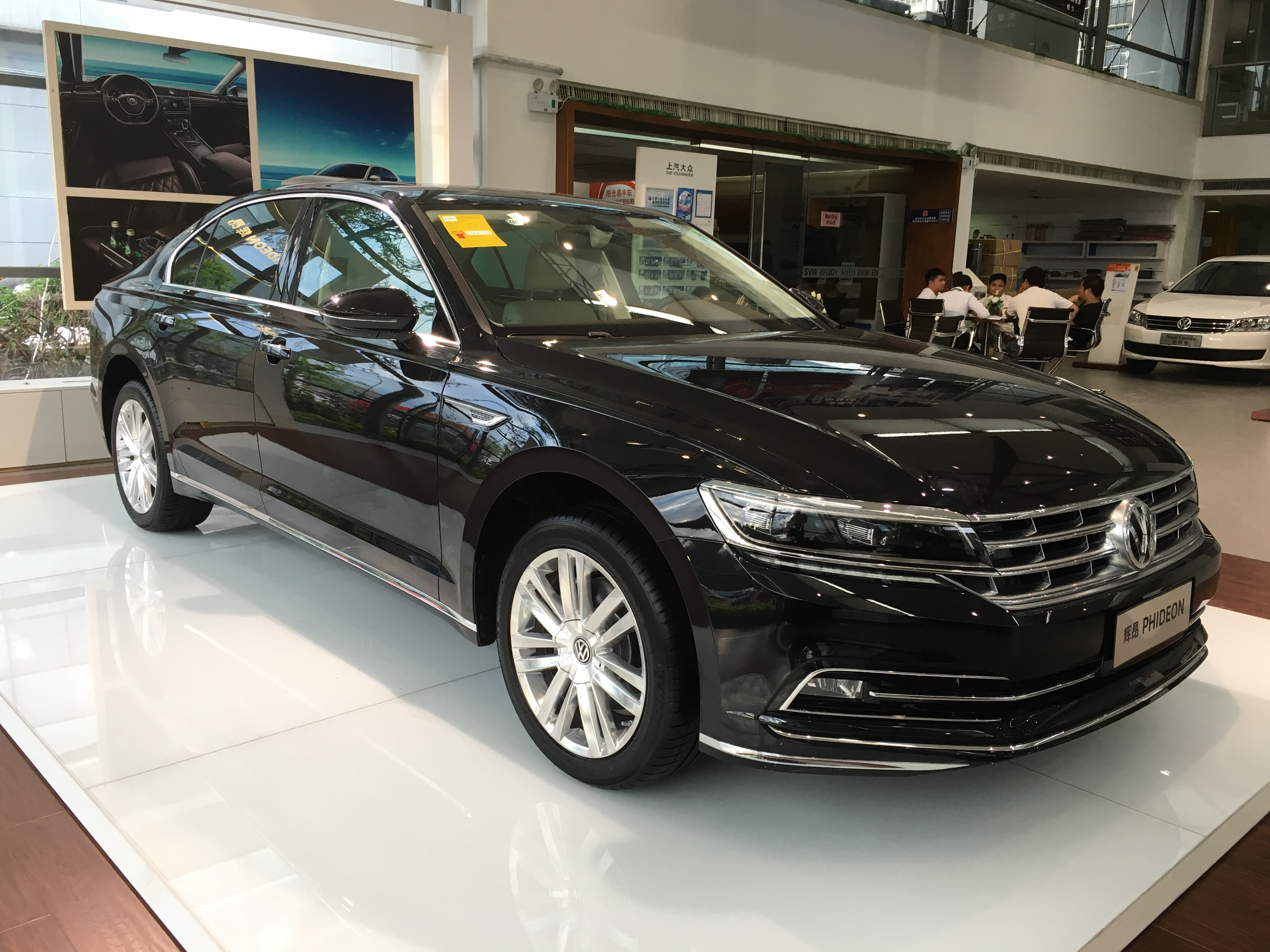
Volkswagen Phideon

== Modularer Längsbaukasten Evo ==
=== MLB Evo B ===
- Audi A4 (Typ 8W), 2015–2025
- Audi A5 (Typ 8W6), 2016–2024
- Audi Q5 (Typ 80A), 2016–2025
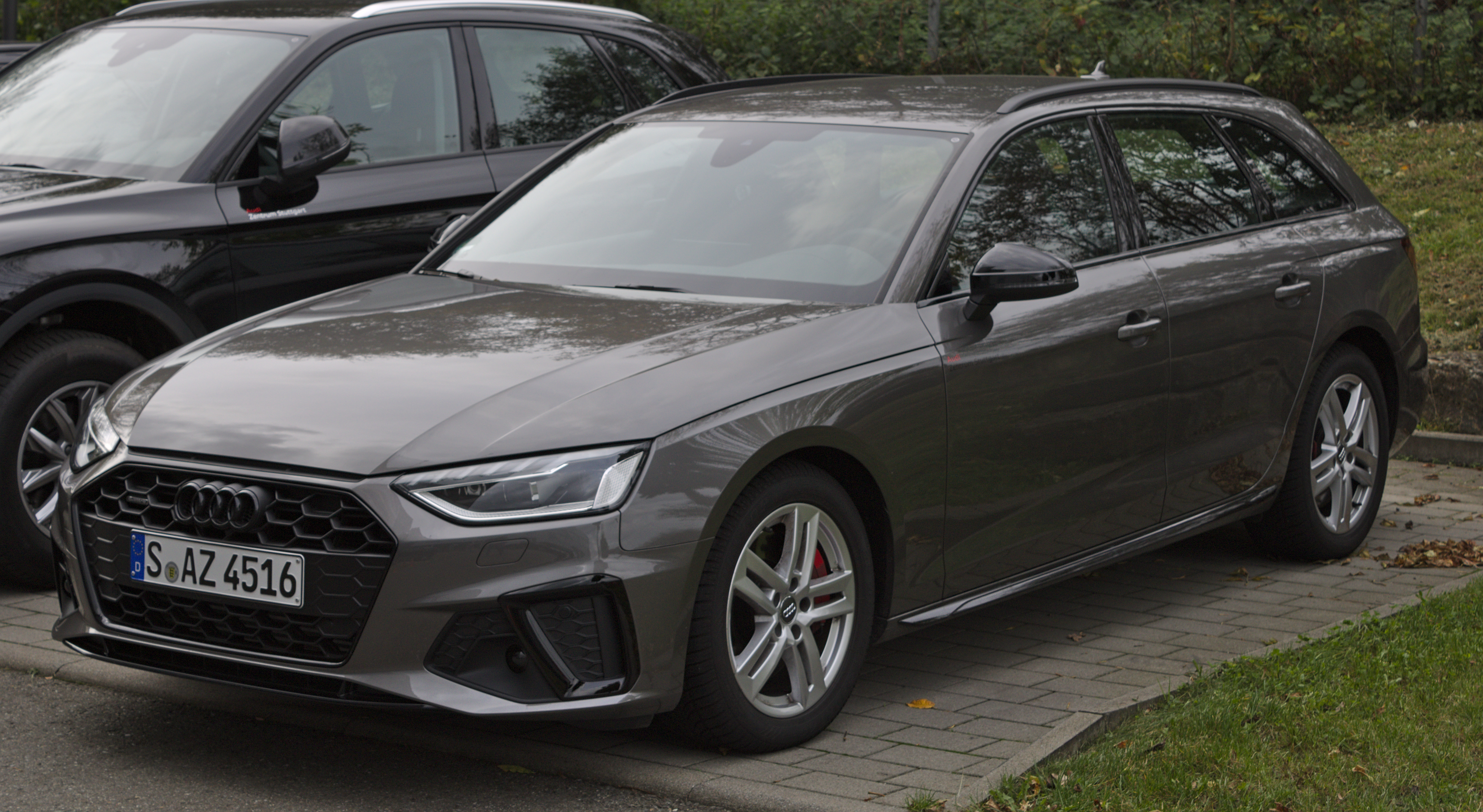
Audi A4 Avant

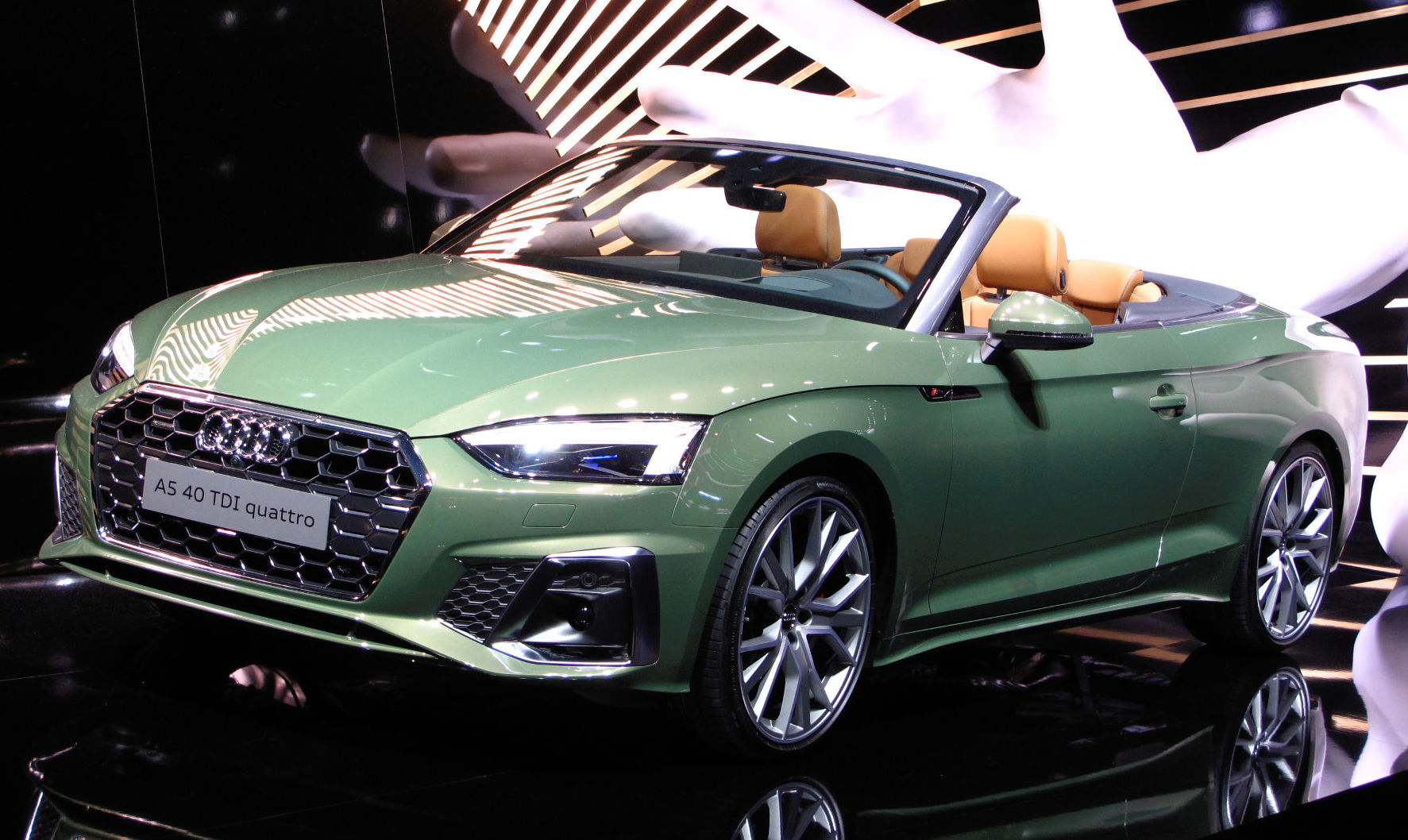
Audi A5 Cabriolet

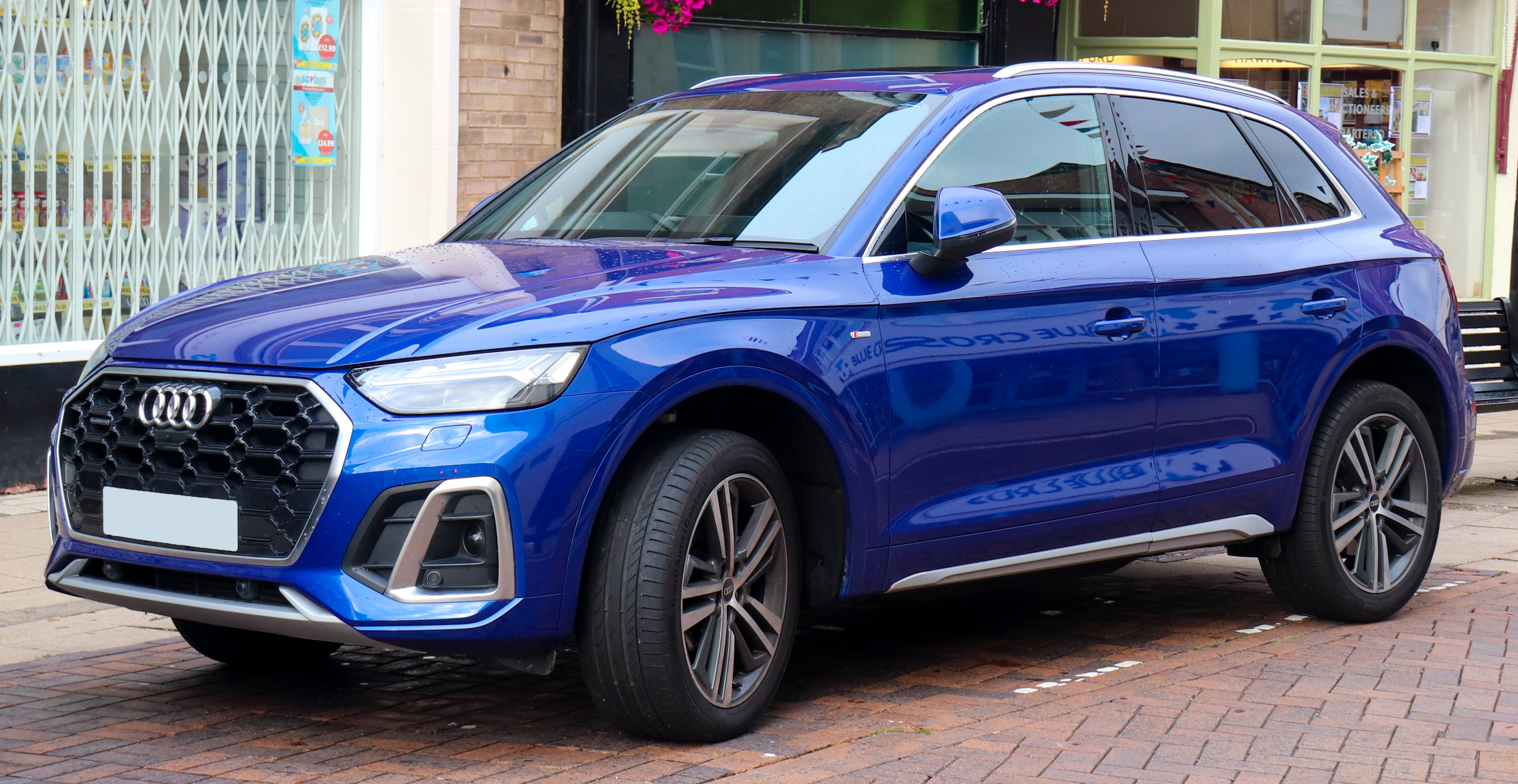
Audi Q5

=== MLB Evo C/D ===
- Audi Q7 (Typ 4M), 2015–2026
- Bentley Bentayga (Typ 4V), 2015–present
- Audi A8 (Typ 4N), 2017–2026
- Audi A7 (Typ 4K8), 2017–2025
- Audi A6 (Typ 4K), 2018–2025
- Audi Q8 (Typ 4MN), 2018–present
- Volkswagen Touareg (Typ CR), 2018–2026
- Audi Q8 e-tron (formerly Audi e-tron; Typ GE), 2018–2025
- Lamborghini Urus, 2018–present
- Porsche Cayenne (third generation) (Type 9YA), 2018–present
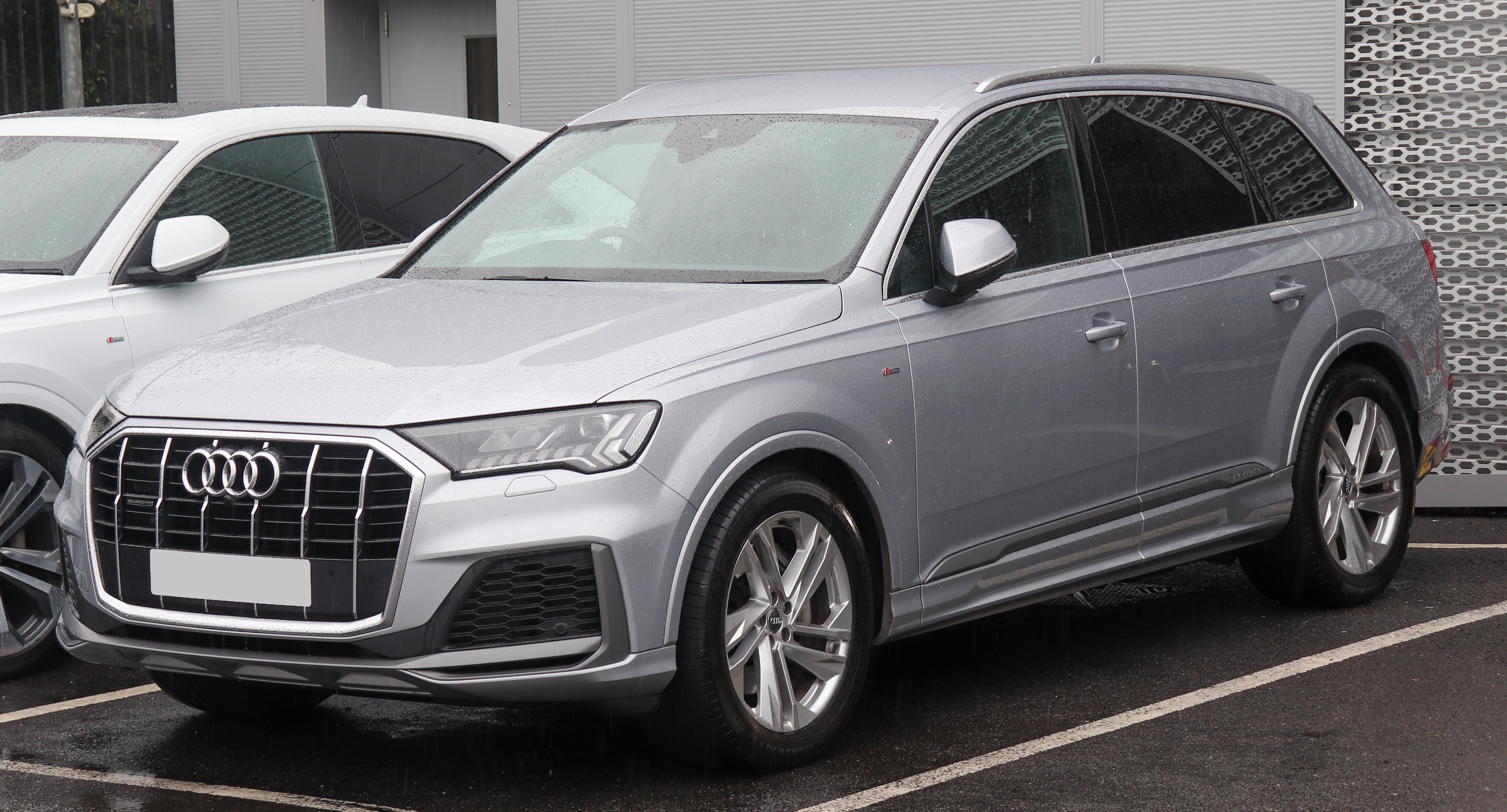
Audi Q7

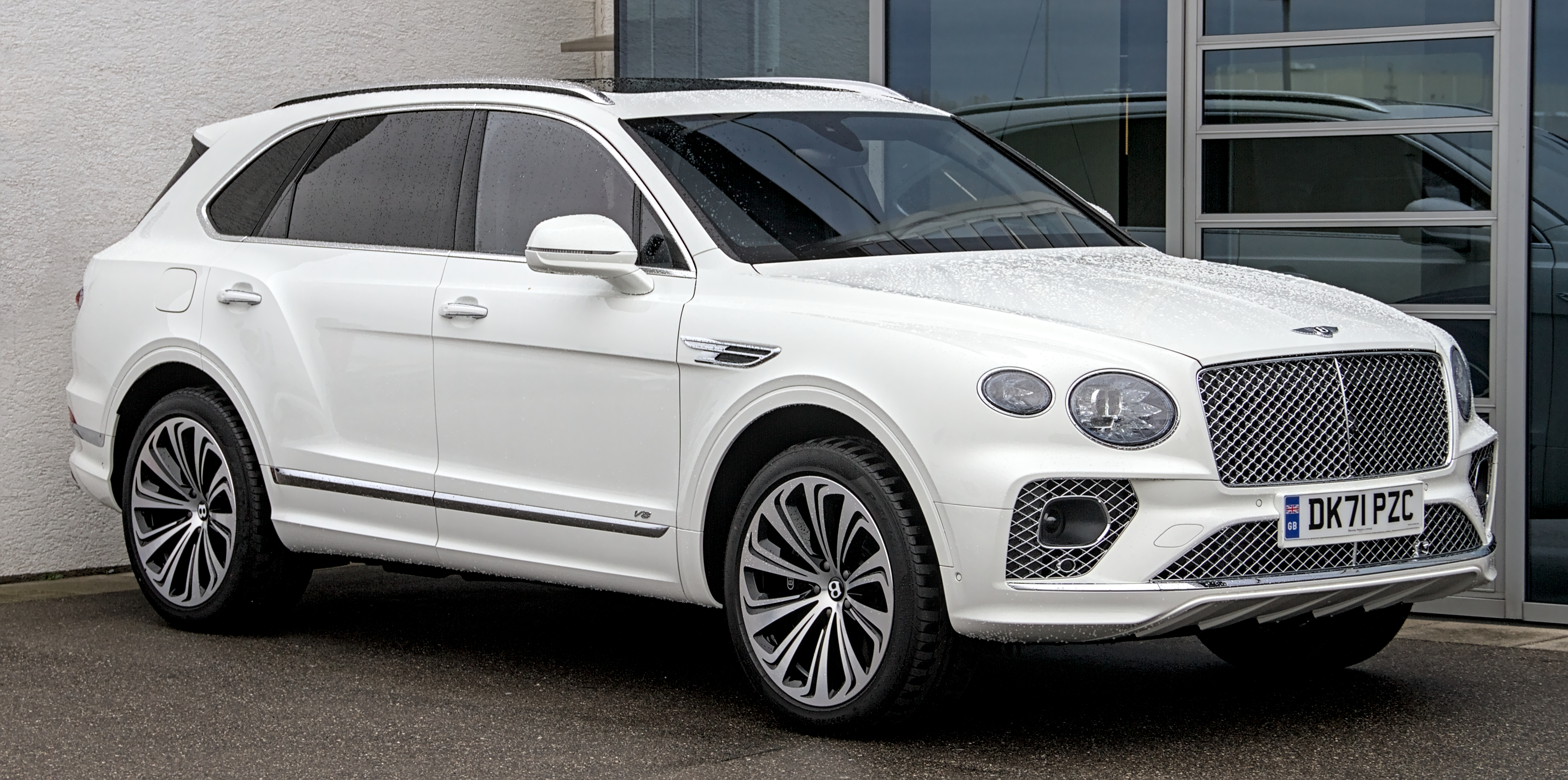
Bentley Bentayga

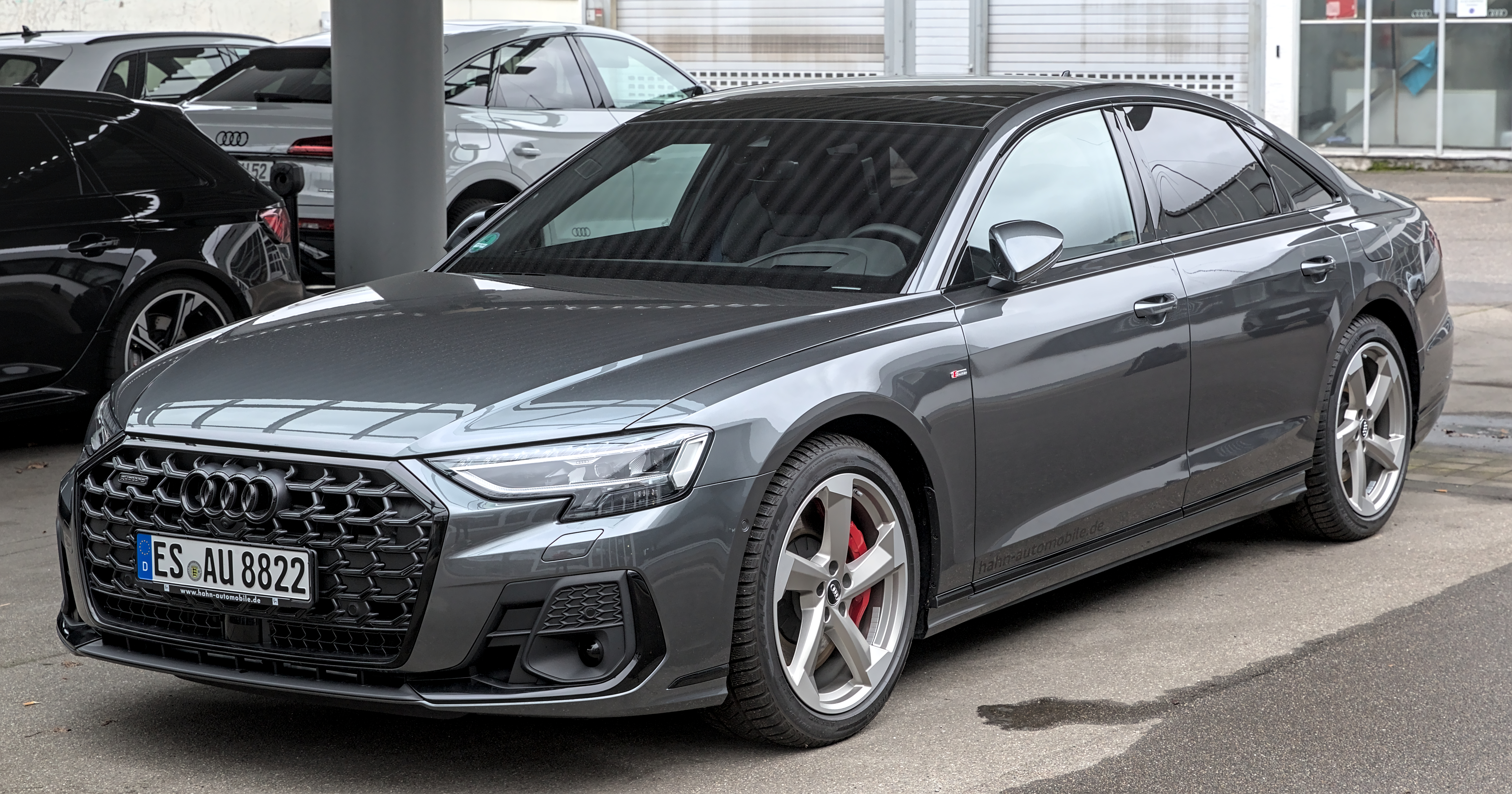
Audi A8

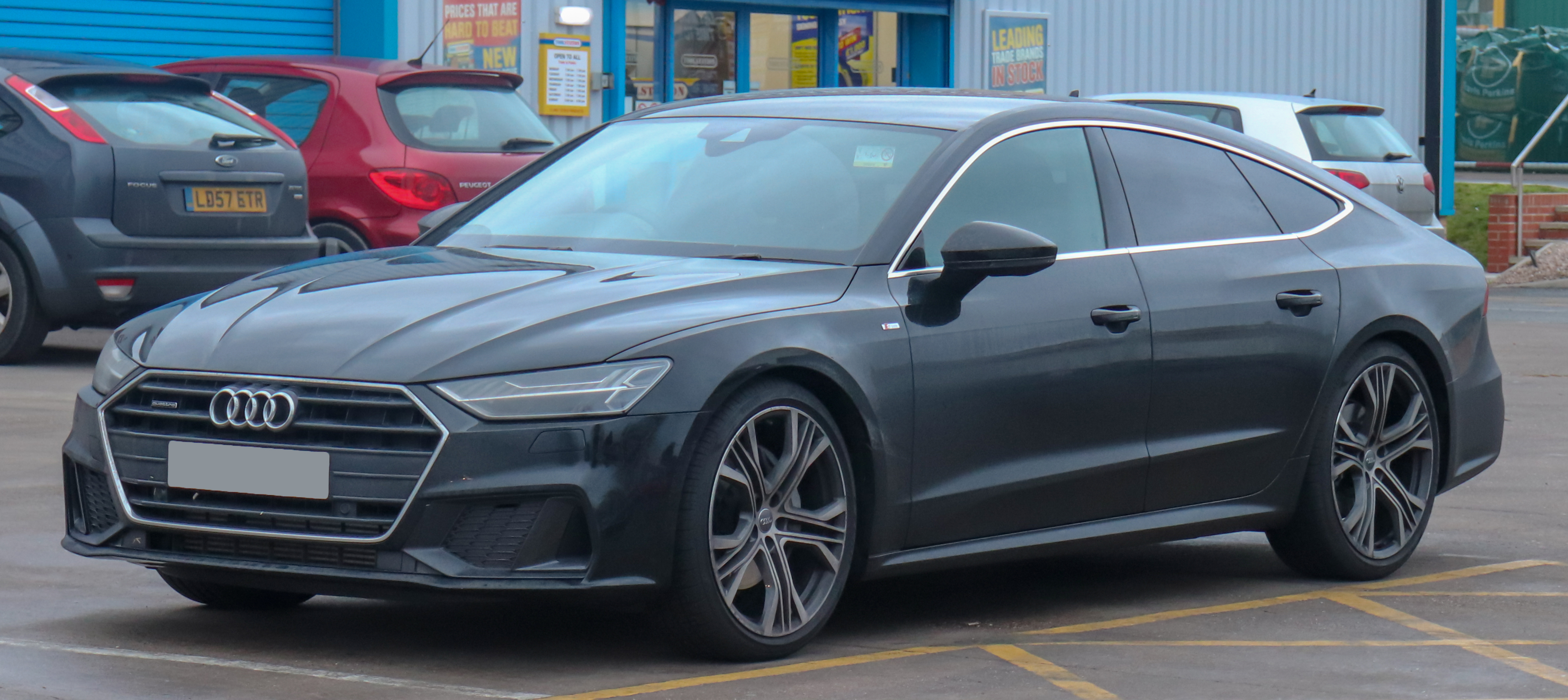
Audi A7

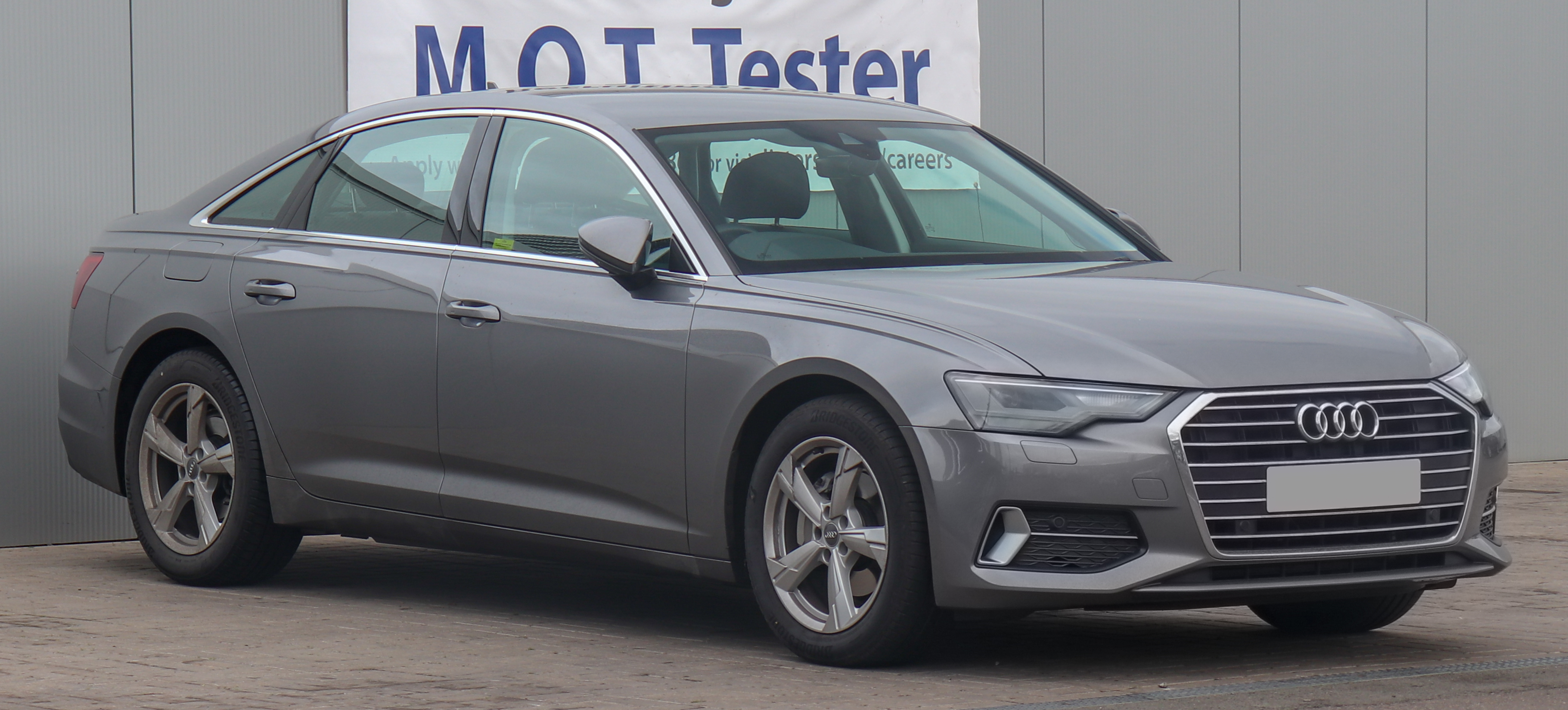
Audi A6

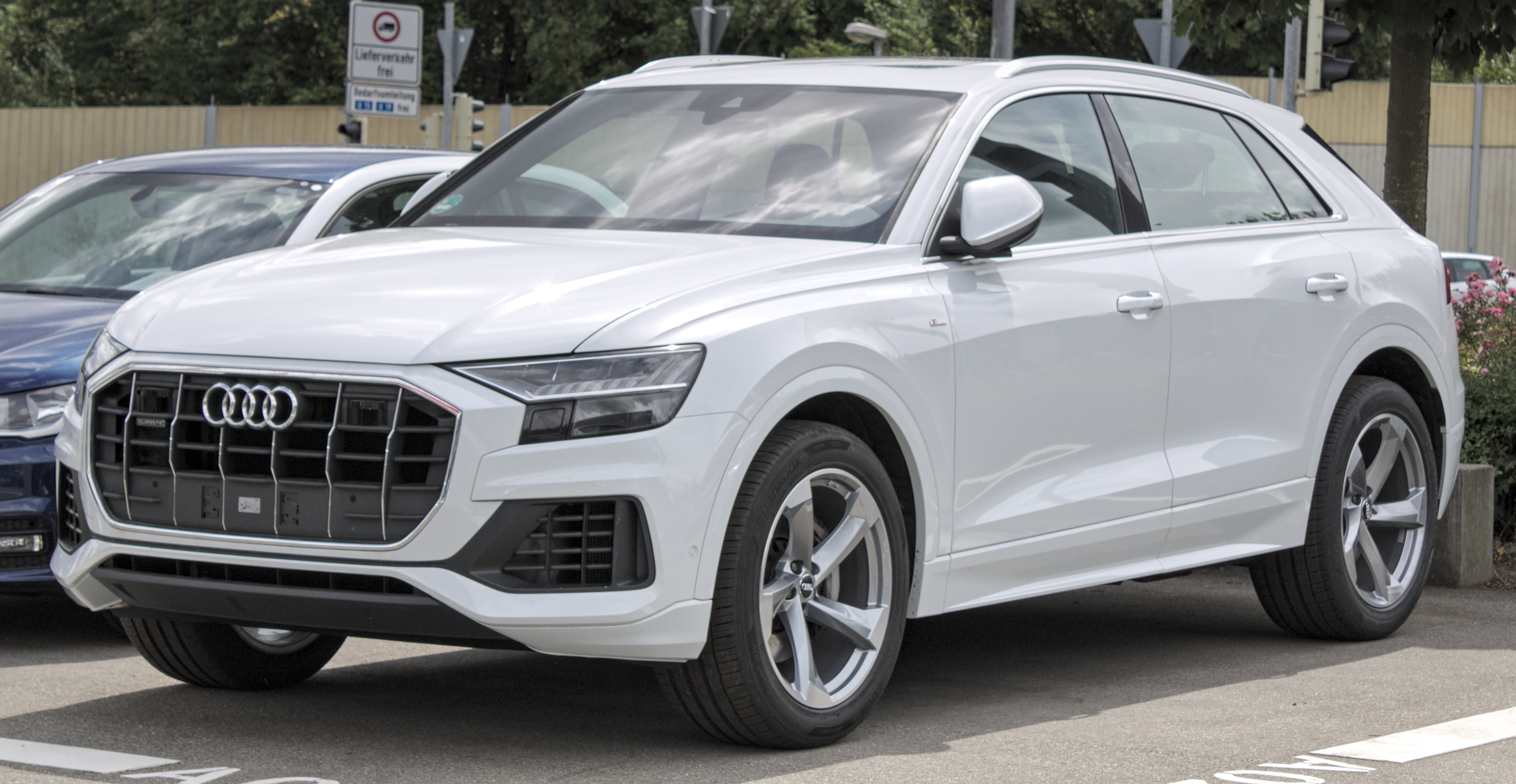
Audi Q8

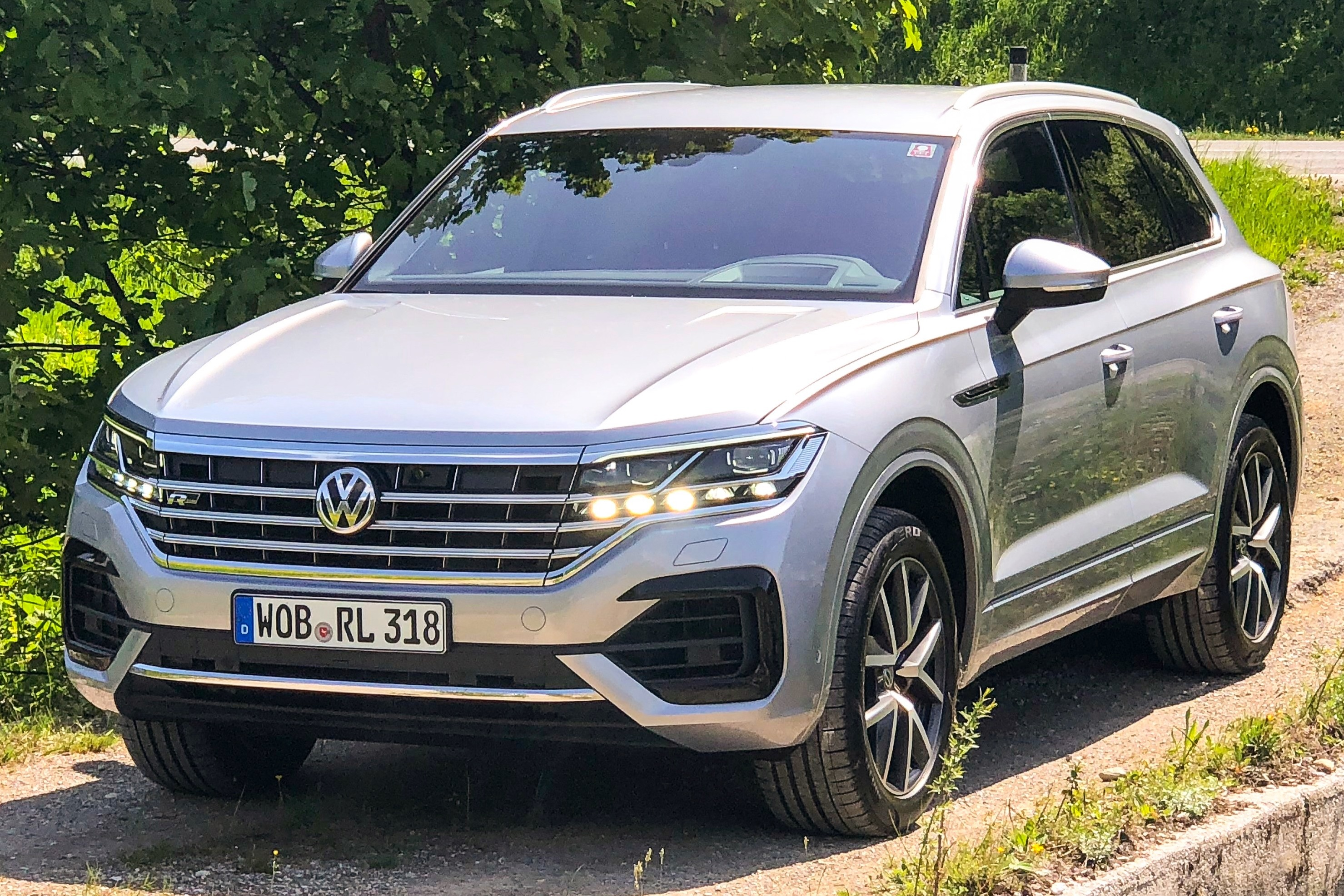
Volkswagen Touareg

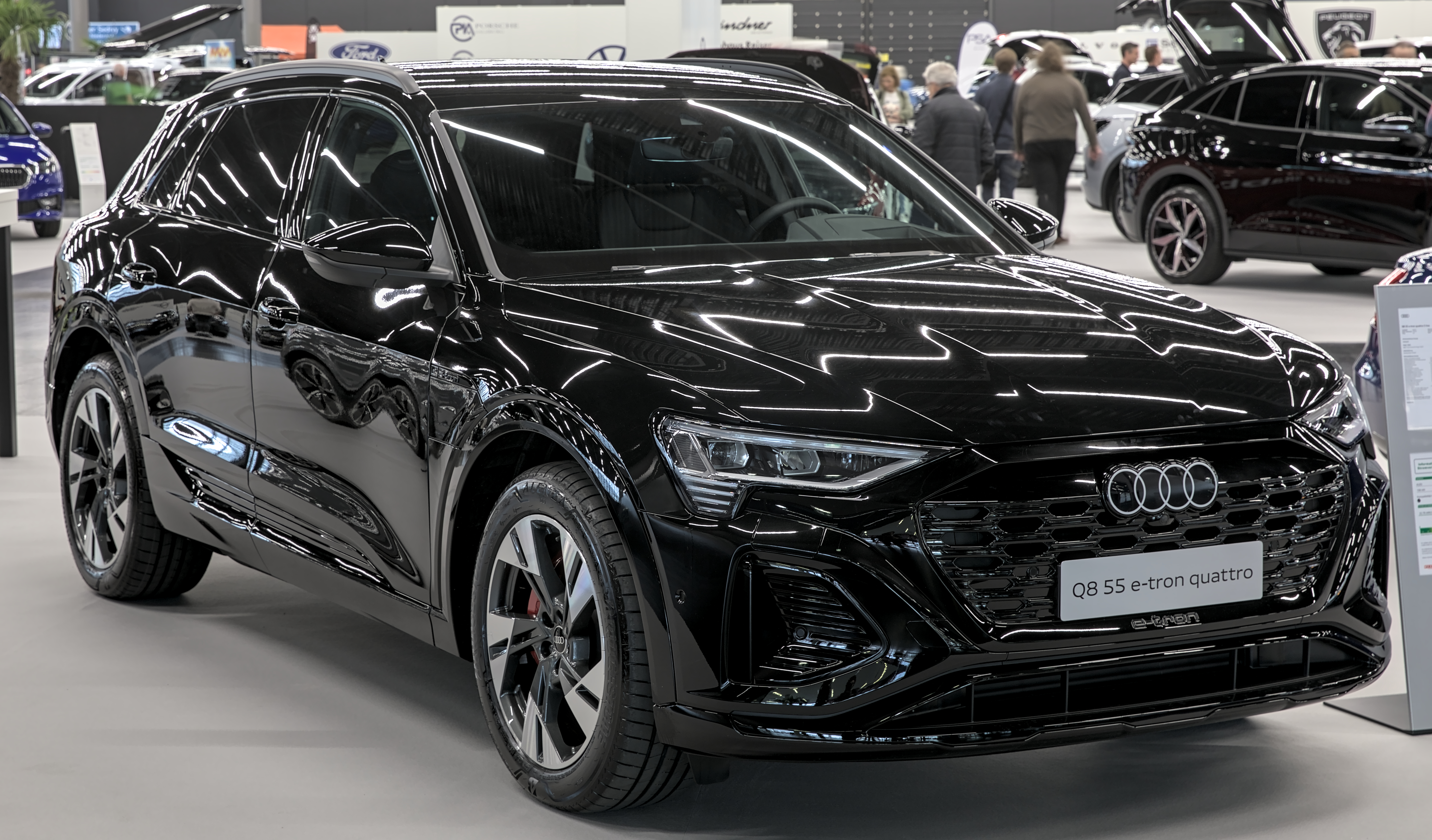
Audi Q8 e-tron

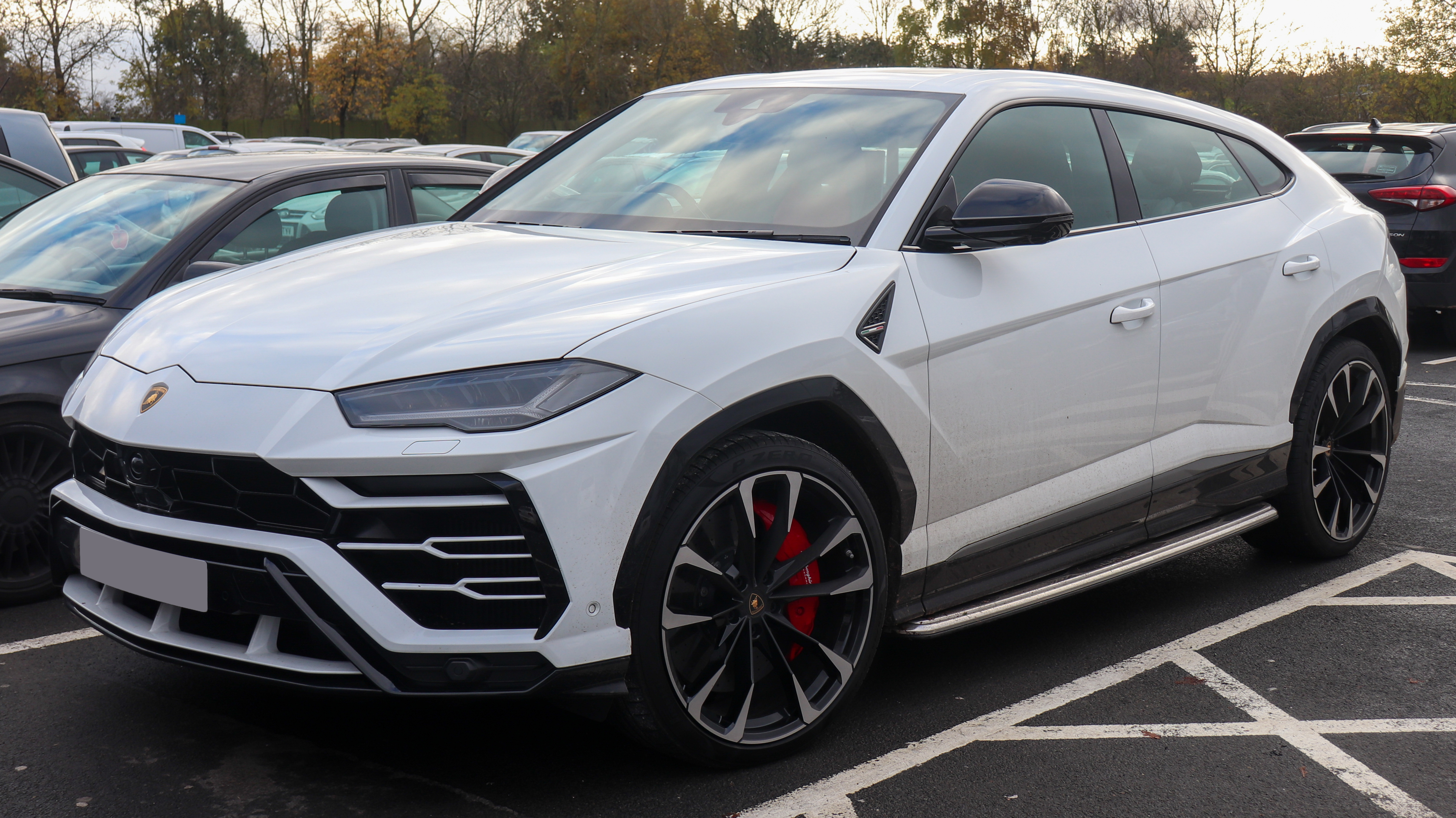
Lamborghini Urus

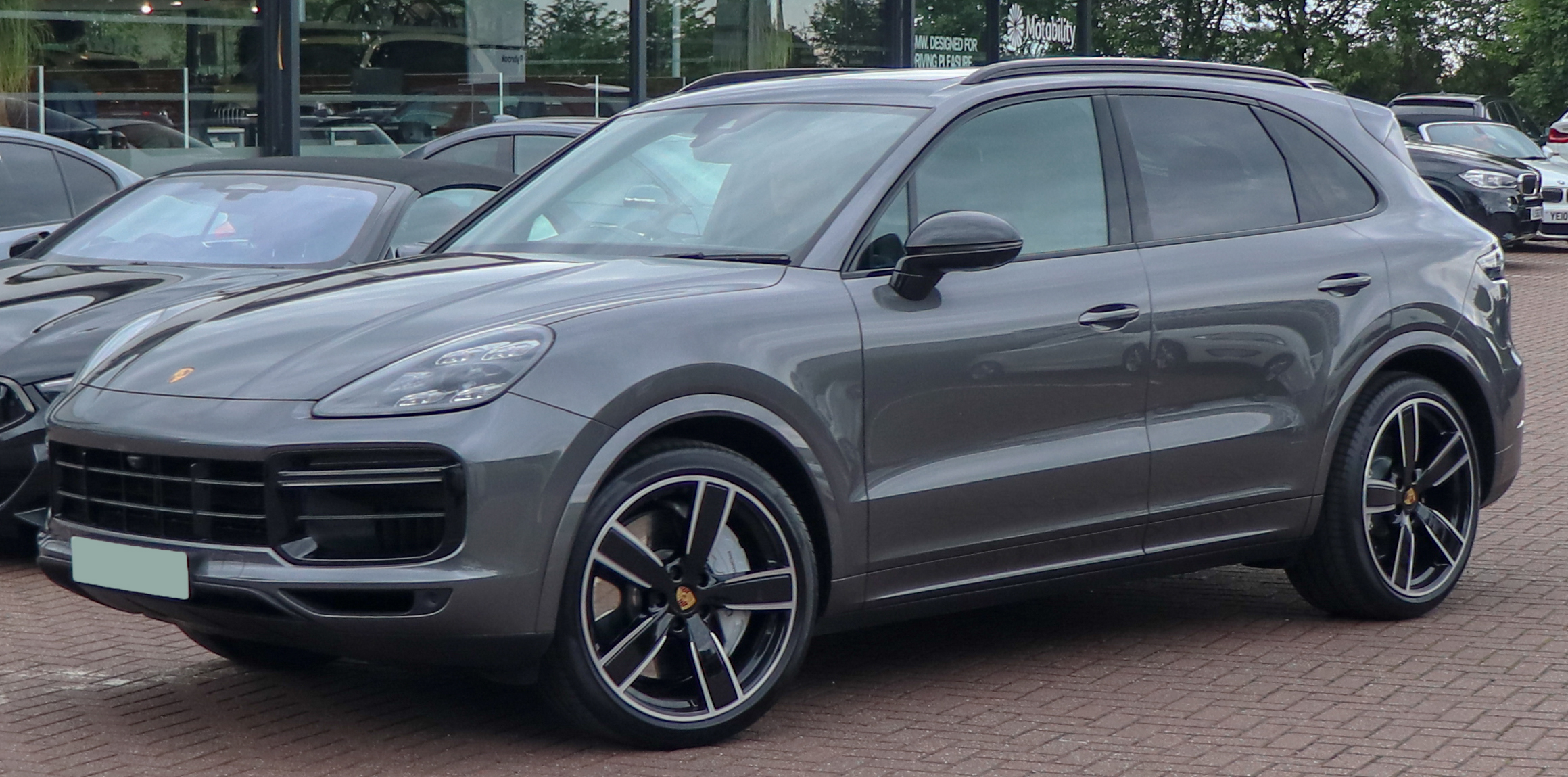
Porsche Cayenne

== Premium Platform Combustion ==
Premium Platform Combustion
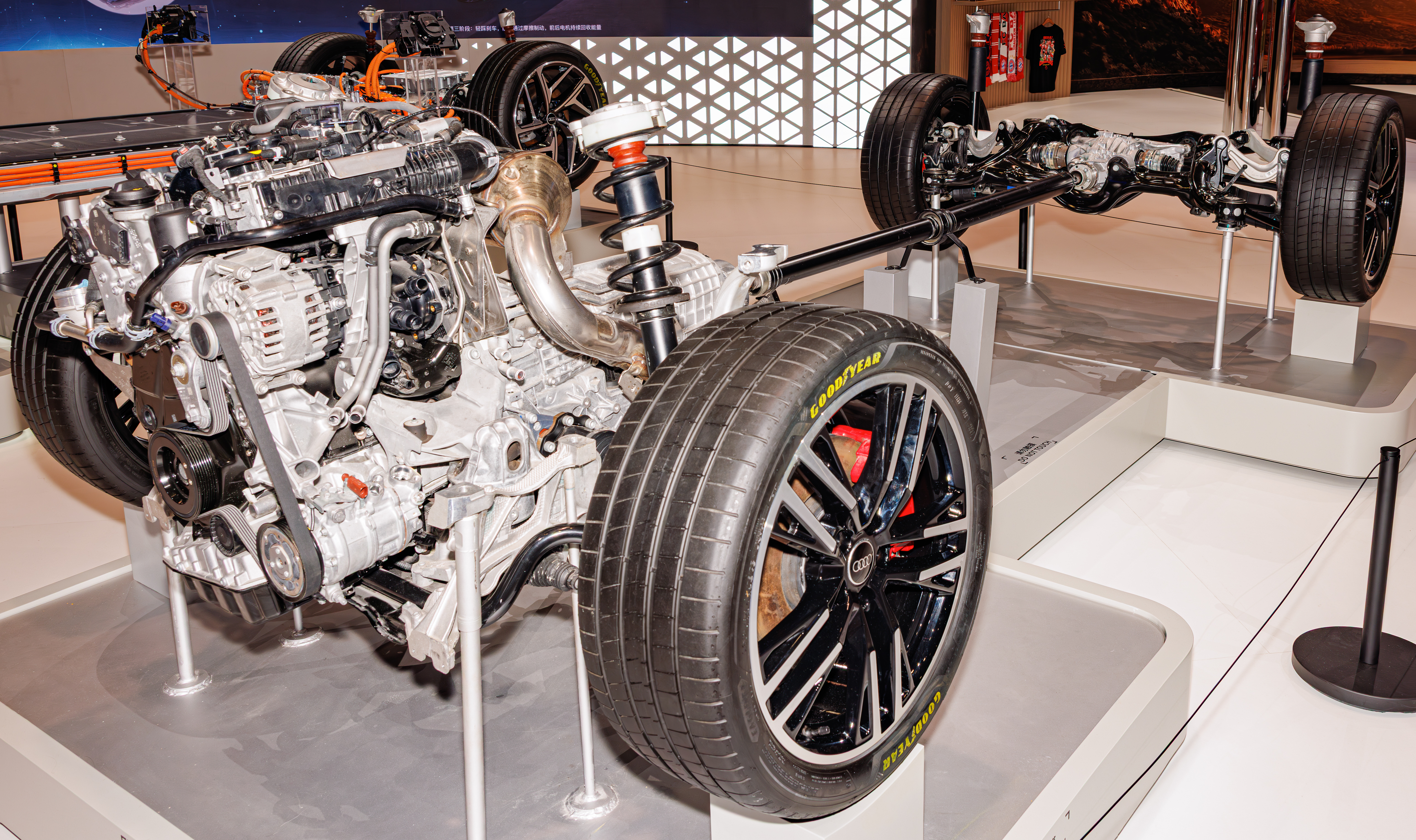

Overview
- Manufacturer: Volkswagen Group
- Production: 2024–present

Body and chassis
- Layout: Longitudinal Front-engine, front-wheel-drive layout; Longitudinal Front-engine, four-wheel-drive layout (Quattro)

Chronology
- Predecessor: MLB Evo B platform (Audi A4 / A5 & Q5); MLB Evo C/D platform (Audi A6 & Q7)

Premium Platform Combustion (PPC) is a modular car platform for internal combustion cars with a longitudinal engine and optional all-wheel drive developed by Volkswagen Group’s Audi unit. It is considered a further development of the MLB platform and can therefore be regarded as the third generation of this platform after MLB and MLB Evo. It made its debut in 2024 with the Audi A5 (B10).

=== Platform strategy ===
The name of the modular platform was chosen in reference to the Premium Platform Electric (PPE), which was developed by Audi and Porsche as an electric-only platform, while the PPC is intended to serve Audi as the last newly developed combustion engine platform. The PPC shares the E³ 1.2 electronics architecture newly developed by Volkswagen subsidiary Cariad with the PPE. Both the PPC and PPE for the premium segment as well as the VW MEB (electric) and MQB Evo (combustion engine) platforms for the volume segment are all to be replaced by the new highly scalable electric-only Scalable Systems Platform (SSP) across all Volkswagen brands from 2029.

=== Technology ===
The PPC serves exclusively as the basis for vehicles with a longitudinally installed combustion engine in the mid-size and luxury class and front-wheel or all-wheel drive. A special feature of the modular platform is the further developed second-generation mild hybrid, which Audi calls ‘MHEV plus technology’. In addition to the familiar belt starter generator, a new powertrain generator with integrated power electronics is placed on the transmission output shaft. In combination with the 48-volt battery, this enables partially electric driving with up to 18 kW of power and 230 Nm of torque. The powertrain generator recuperates energy back into the battery at up to 25 kW. The battery is positioned above the rear axle and has a separate cooling circuit. Overall, the system is designed to increase the fuel efficiency.

The engines used are 2-litre in-line four-cylinder petrol engines from the EA888 series, 3-litre V6 petrol engines from the EA839 series and 2-litre in-line four-cylinder diesel engines from the EA288 evo series. Only 7-speed dual-clutch gearboxes are used. Manual gearboxes are no longer fitted. Instead of fake tailpipe trims as in the previous generation, only real tailpipes are fitted in response to customer feedback.

=== Models ===
- Audi A5 B10 (2024–present)
- Audi A6 C9 (2025–present)
- Audi Q5 GU (2024–present)
- Audi Q7 G8 (2026–present)
- Audi Q9 (2026–present)
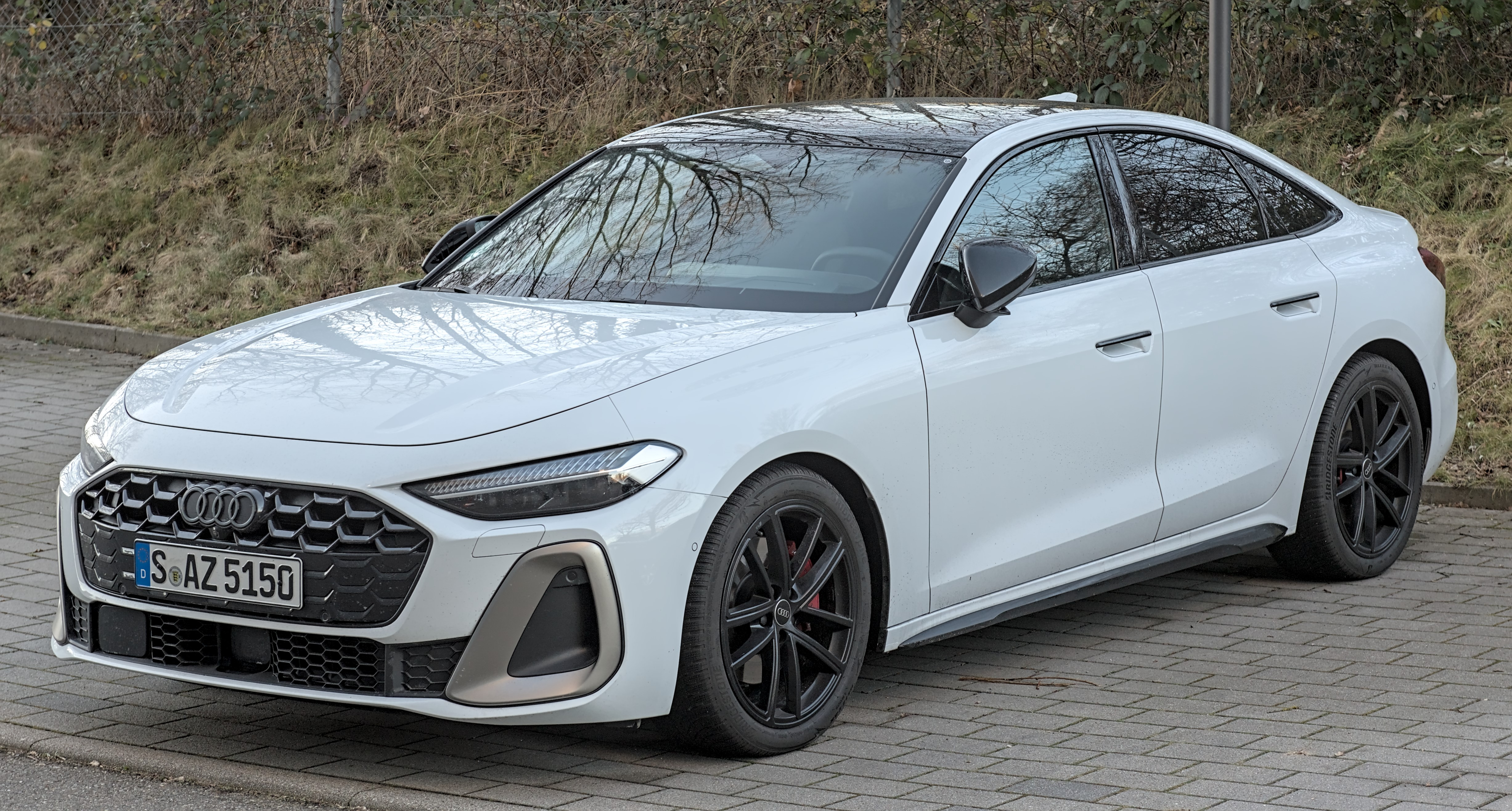
Audi A5 B10

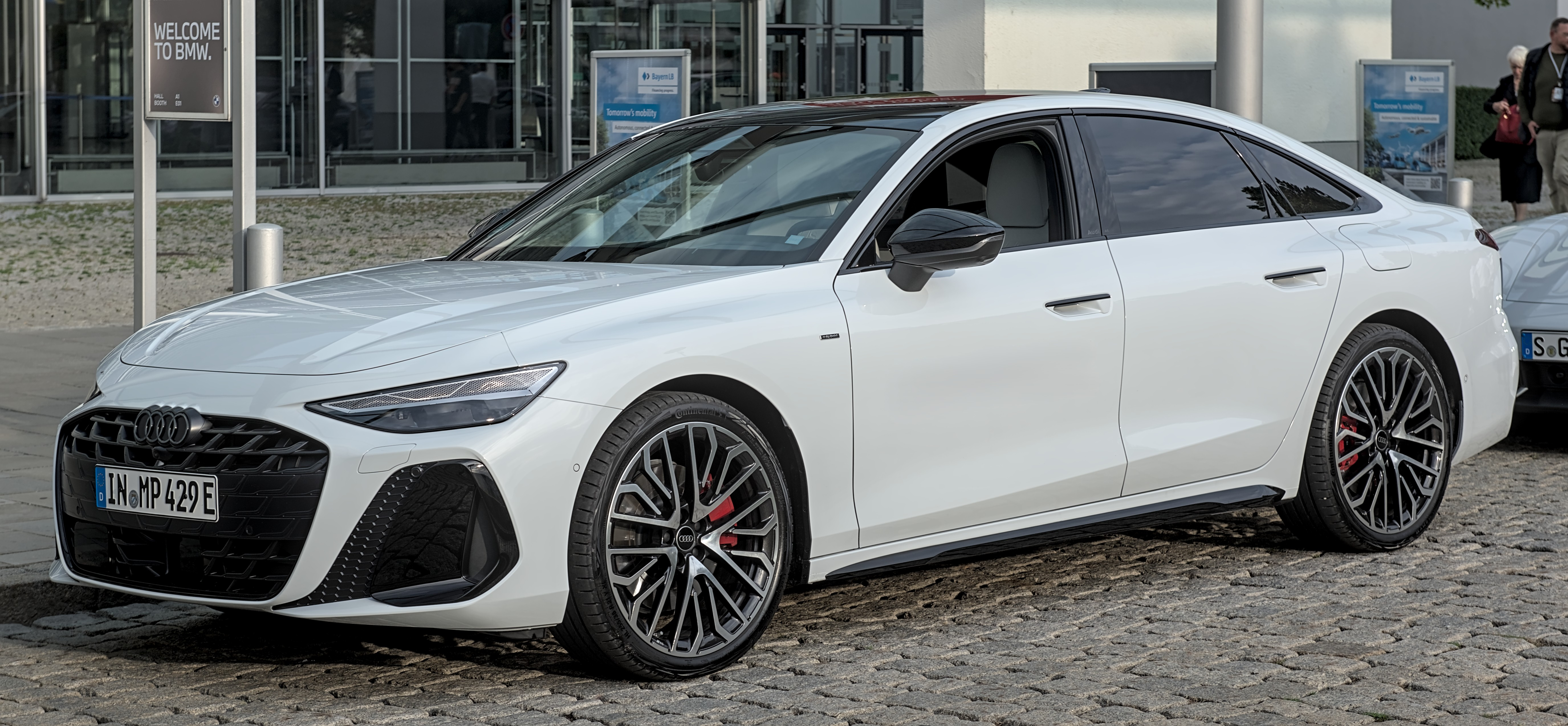
Audi A6 C9

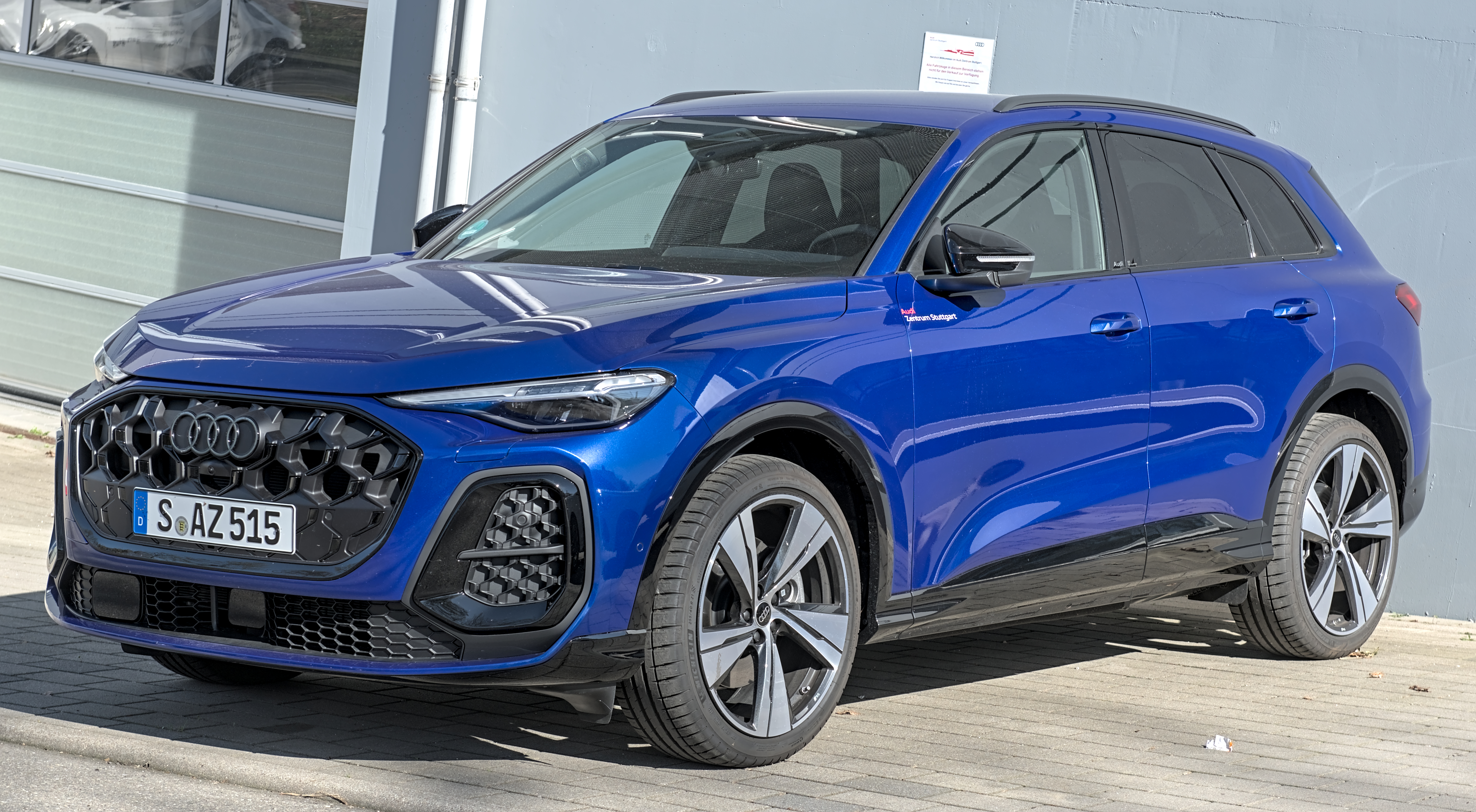
Audi Q5 G8

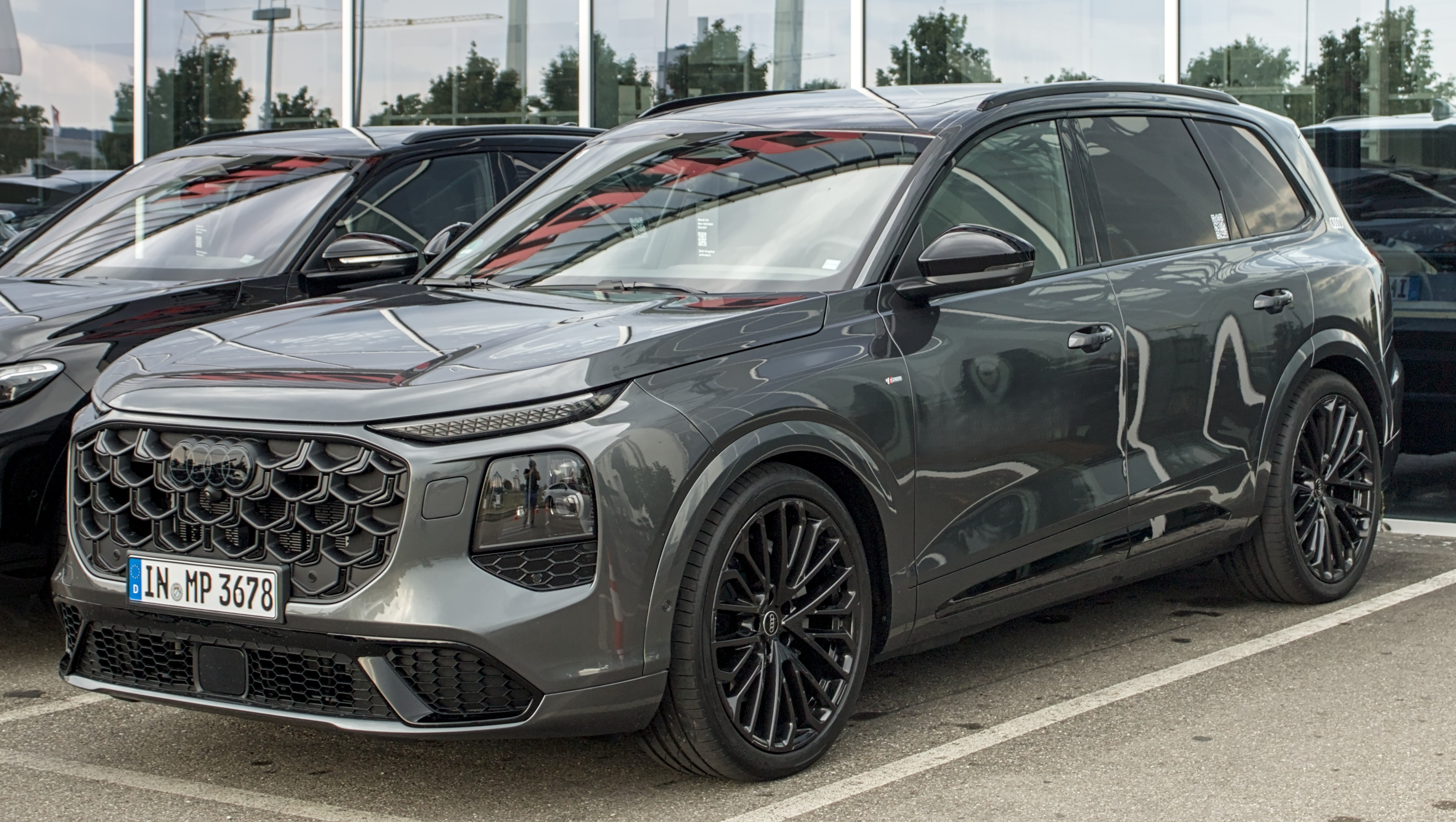
Audi Q7 G8

Audi Q9

== See also ==
- Volkswagen Group MQB platform
- Volkswagen Group MSB platform
- Volkswagen Group New Small Family platform
- List of Volkswagen Group platforms
