= Volkswagen Phideon =

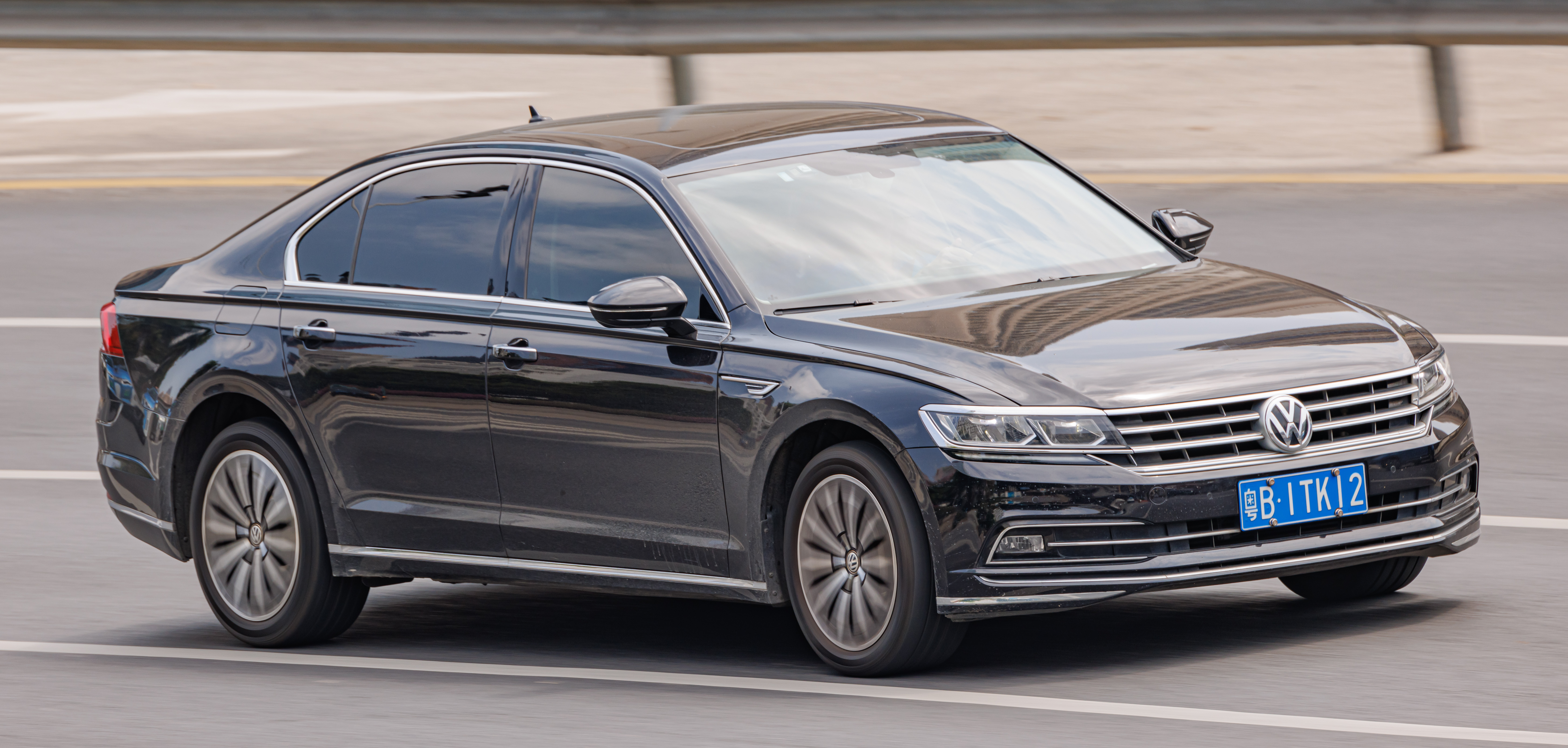

Overview
- Manufacturer: Volkswagen
- Model code: 3E
- Production: 2016–2023
- Assembly: China: Shanghai (SAIC-VW)
- Designer: Felix Schell

Body and chassis
- Class: Executive car (E)
- Body style: 4-door sedan
- Layout: Longitudinal front-engine, front-wheel drive; Longitudinal front-engine, four-wheel drive (4motion until 2021)
- Platform: MLB
- Related: Audi A6/A6L; Audi A7

Powertrain
- Engine: Petrol: 2.0 L EA888 I4-T; 2.0 L EA888 I4-T PHEV; 3.0 L EA837 V6-Supercharged (2016–2021)
- Electric motor: Permanent magnet brushless electric motor (PHEV)
- Power output: 224 hp (167 kW; 227 PS) (2.0 L); 241 hp (180 kW; 244 PS) (2.0 L PHEV); 296 hp (221 kW; 300 PS) (3.0 L)
- Transmission: 7-speed DL382 dual-clutch
- Hybrid drivetrain: Plug-in Hybrid (Phideon GTE; 2016–2020)
- Electric range: 50 km (plug-in hybrid)

Dimensions
- Wheelbase: 3,009 mm (118.5 in)
- Length: 5,074 mm (199.8 in)
- Width: 1,893 mm (74.5 in)
- Height: 1,489 mm (58.6 in)
- Kerb weight: 1,815 kg (4,001.4 lb)

Chronology
- Predecessor: Volkswagen Phaeton

The Volkswagen Phideon (Chinese: 大众辉昂; pinyin: Dàzhòng Huīáng) is an executive sedan manufactured by the German automobile manufacturer Volkswagen, described by Volkswagen as their "premium class" vehicle. Introduced at the 2016 Geneva Motor Show, the Phideon is aimed at the Chinese market. Sales officially started in July 2016.

== Overview ==
The Phideon is the first car under the Volkswagen brand to be based on Volkswagen's MLB platform. It is powered by either a 224 hp (167 kW; 227 PS) 2.0-litre turbocharged four-cylinder EA888 or a 296 hp (221 kW; 300 PS) 3.0-litre supercharged V6 EA837 petrol engines and is available with an optional 4motion all-wheel drive system. The 2.0-litre plug-in hybrid version is also available, which was launched in April 2017. The Phideon is also the first Volkswagen model to have a camera-based night vision system.

The Phideon is equipped with the Active Info Display which replaced the conventional instrument cluster, and chauffeur mode which allows passengers to send content to the infotainment system.

The car sold 24,471 units in 2018. Sales dropped to 14,019 units in 2019.

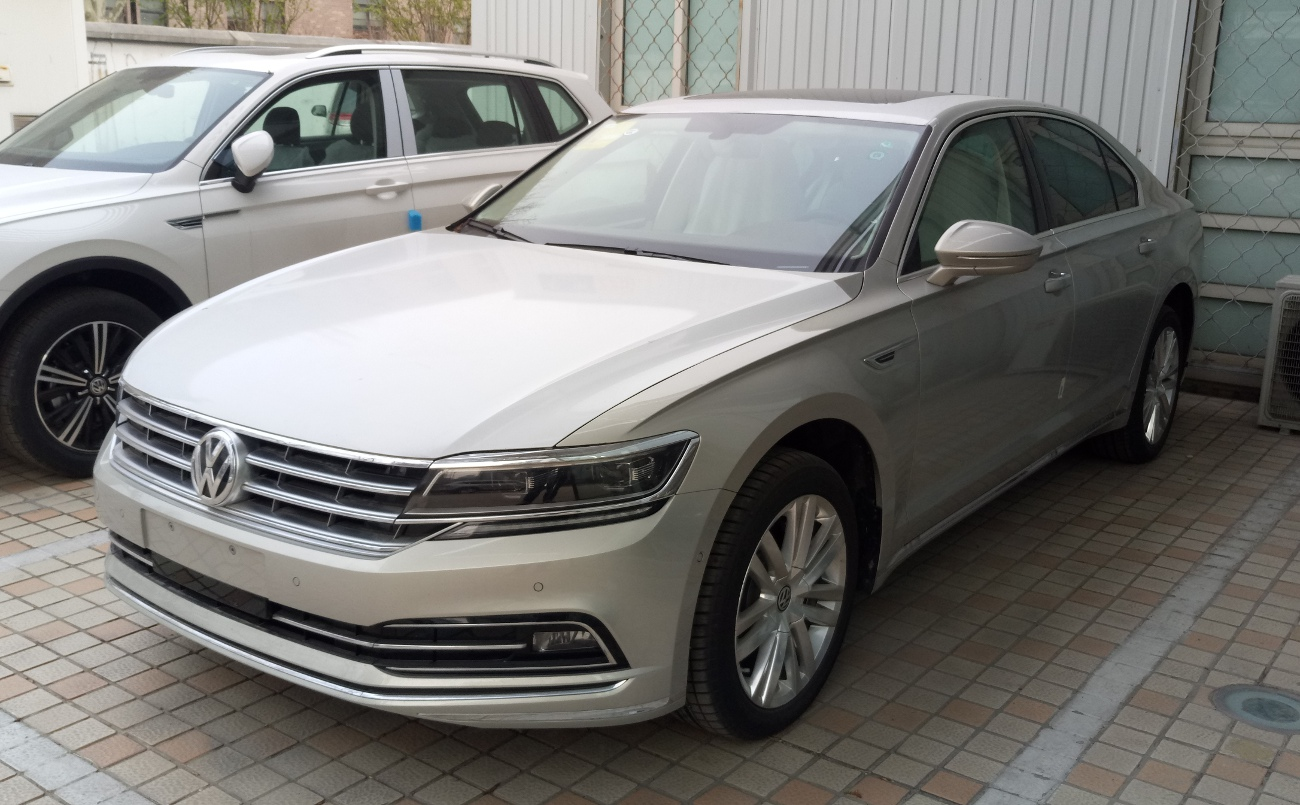
Front view (pre-facelift)

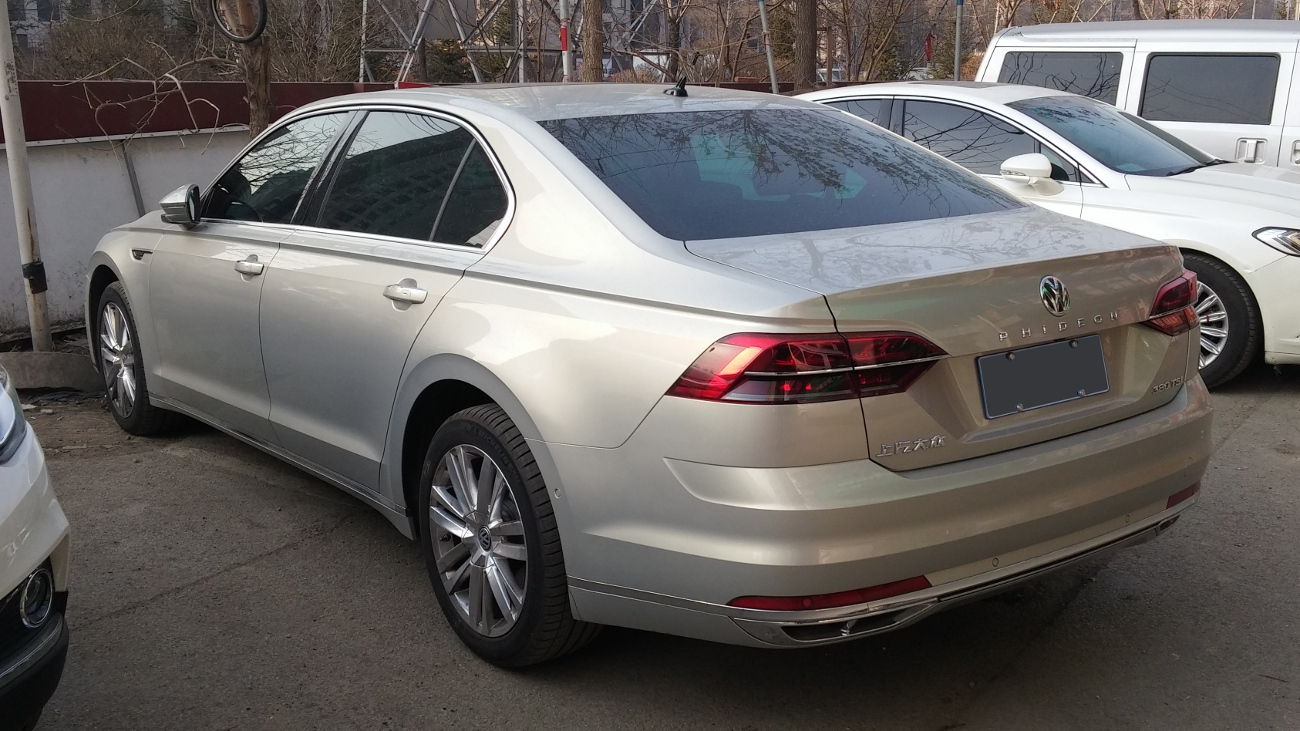
Rear view (pre-facelift)

== 2021 facelift ==
A facelifted Phideon was revealed at the 2020 Guangzhou Auto Show. The facelift introduced an updated front bumper which added chrome inserts and modified sections around the fog lamps. The grille was updated with an illuminated badge flanked by an LED daytime running light strip extending on the sides to meet the redesigned headlamps. The all-wheel drive, V6, and plug-in hybrid options were dropped.

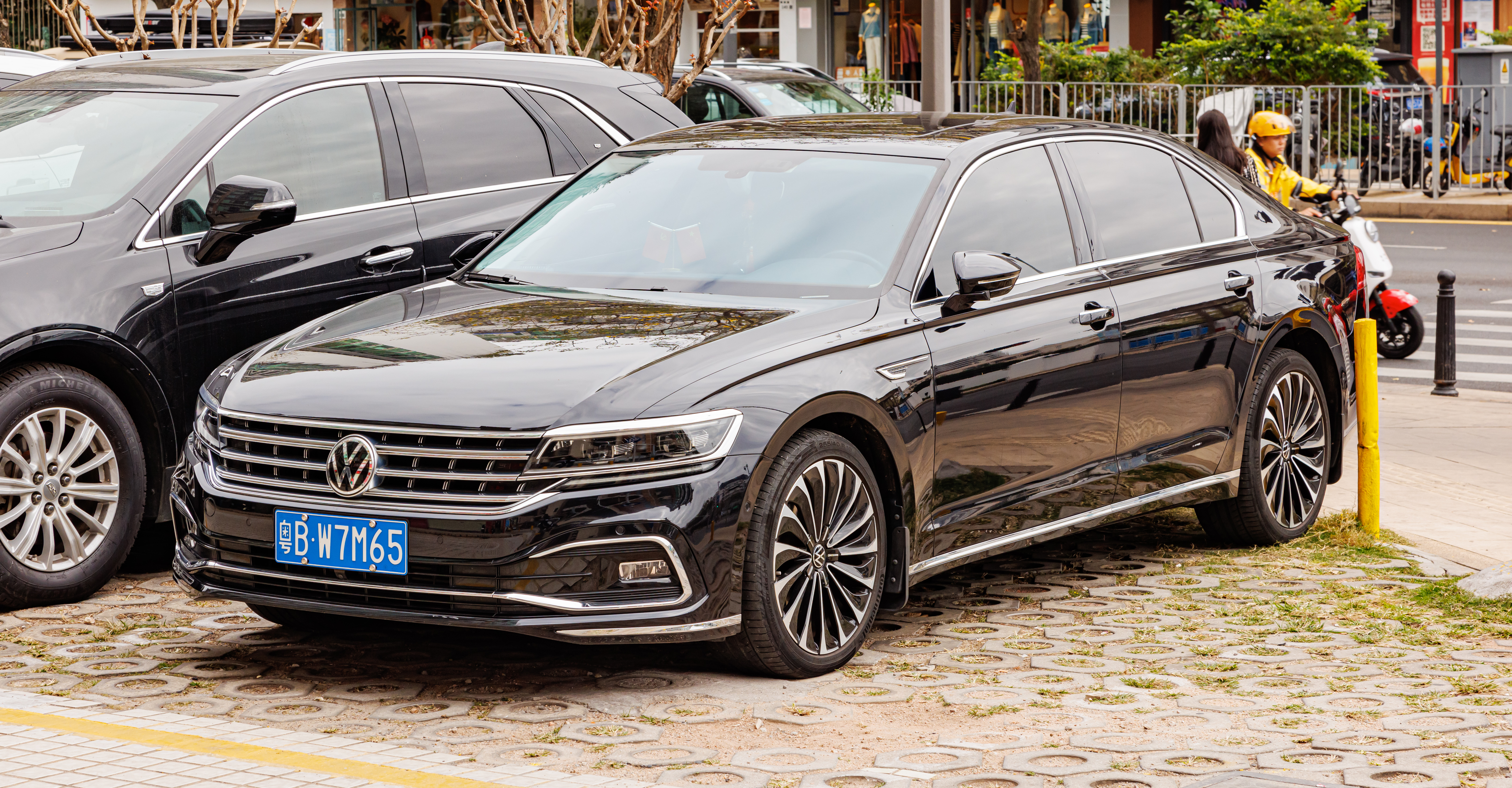
2021 facelift

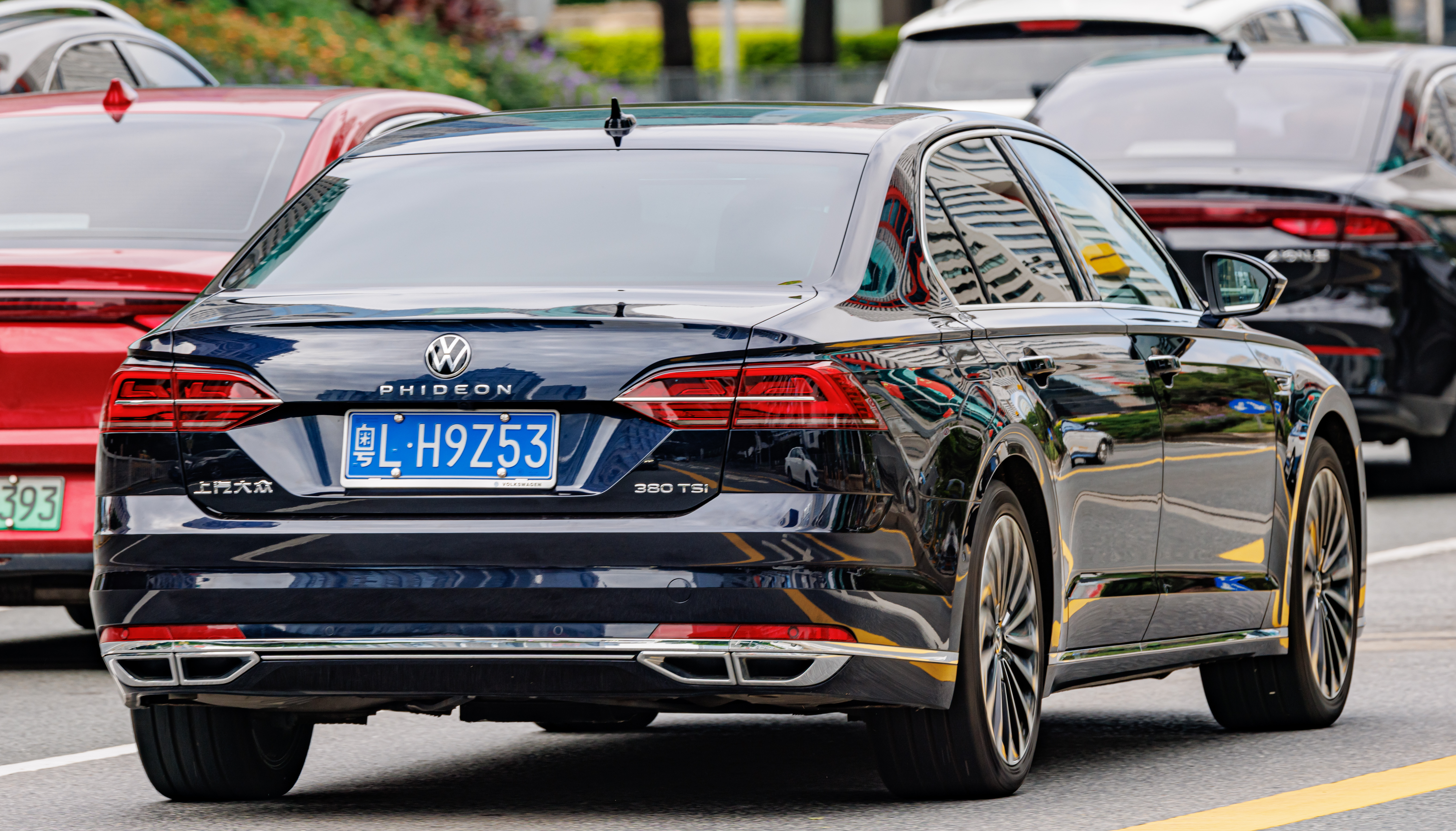
Rear view

== Sales ==
Year	Production
2016	5,131
2017	13,014
2018	24,102
2019	13,750
2020	10,344
2021	6,618
2022	7,480
2023	31
2024	13
2025	1
