= Audi AI:RACE =

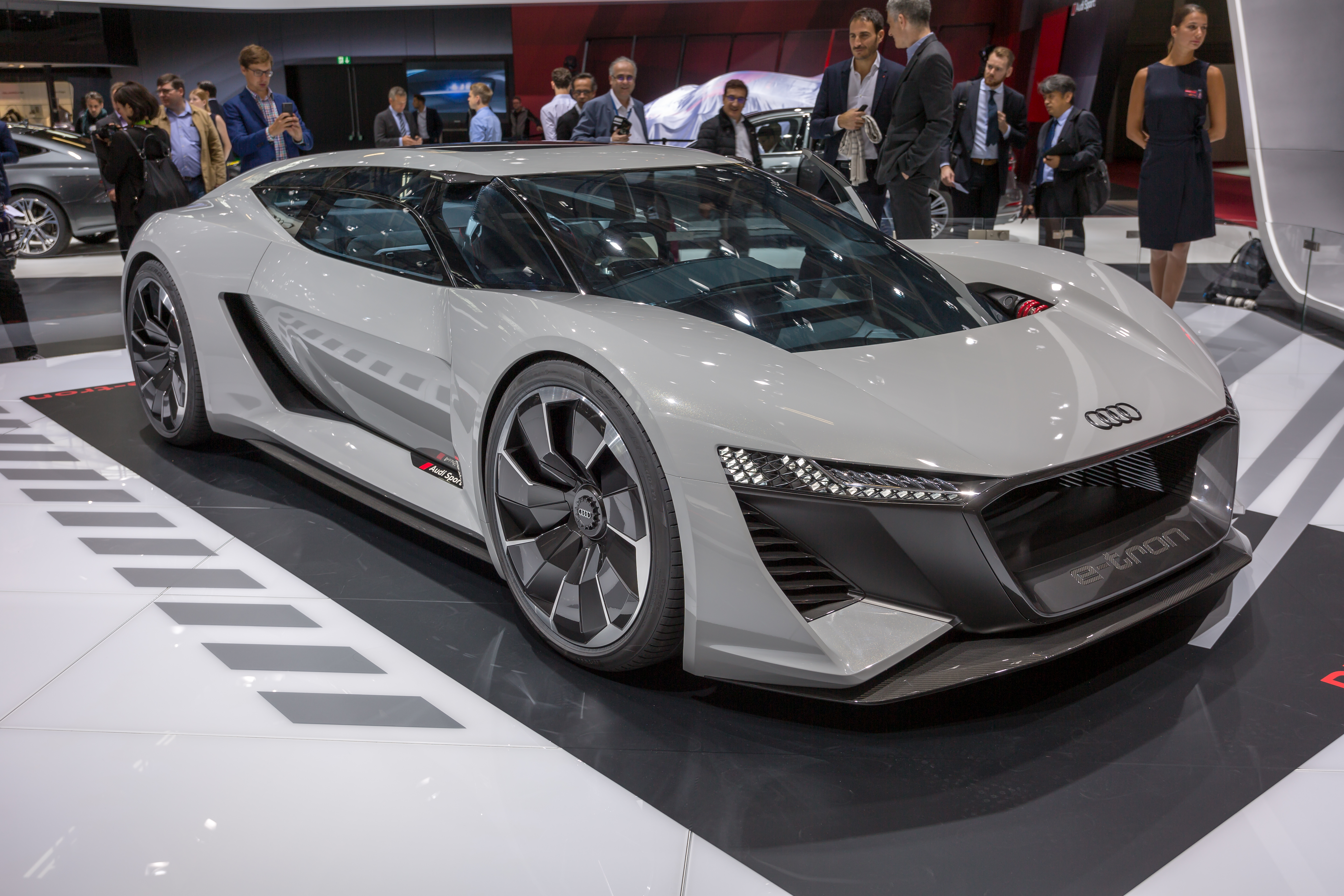
- Audi AI:RACE at the 2018 Paris Motor Show

Overview
- Manufacturer: Audi AG, Audi Sport GmbH
- Also called: Audi PB18 e-tron; Audi PB18
- Production: 2018

Body and chassis
- Class: Concept car
- Body style: 2-door hatchback sports car
- Layout: Tri-motors, 4WD
- Related: Audi Aicon

Powertrain
- Electric motor: 3 electric motors (1 front, 2 rear) producing a combined 661 bhp (493 kW; 670 PS)
- Electric range: 361 mi (581 km)
- Plug-in charging: 15 min @ 800 volt

Dimensions
- Kerb weight: 1,550 kg (3,417 lb)

The Audi AI:RACE, codenamed the PB18 e-tron, is a 2-door hatchback electric sports car concept developed by a division of the German automaker Audi AG, Audi Sport GmbH and introduced in 2018. The name "PB18" refers to the 2018 Pebble Beach Automotive Week in Monterey, California, where the AI:RACE debuted. In January 2019, Audi confirmed that 50 examples will make their way to production within the next two years.

== Specifications ==
The AI:RACE is powered by 3 electric motors, 1 on the front axle and 2 on the rear axle, sending power to all 4 wheels. It produces a combined 661 bhp (493 kW; 670 PS) and 612 lb⋅ft (830 N⋅m) of torque, with the capability to "overboost" to 753 bhp (562 kW; 763 PS) for short periods. It uses a low-mid mounted 95 kWh solid-state battery with an 800-volt charging capacity that Audi claims has a range of 361 mi (581 km) and can charge to full capacity in 15 minutes. It supports conventional charging as well as Audi Wireless Charging (AWC) using a charging pad which can attach to the floor of a garage. Audi also claims a 0–62 mph (0–100 km/h) acceleration time of around 2 seconds. It also features an unconventional interior that allows the driver to convert between a single-seater, central driving position and a conventional two-seater configuration with the driver on the left and a single fold down passenger seat on the right. This is made possible because the AI:RACE uses a drive by wire system, in which the main driving functions are controlled by the onboard computers. The AI:RACE provides 16.6 cubic feet (0.47 m^{3}) of storage from its hatchback bodystyle. It also features 22-inch wheels, carbon disc brakes and adaptive magnetic ride shock absorbers.

== Gallery ==
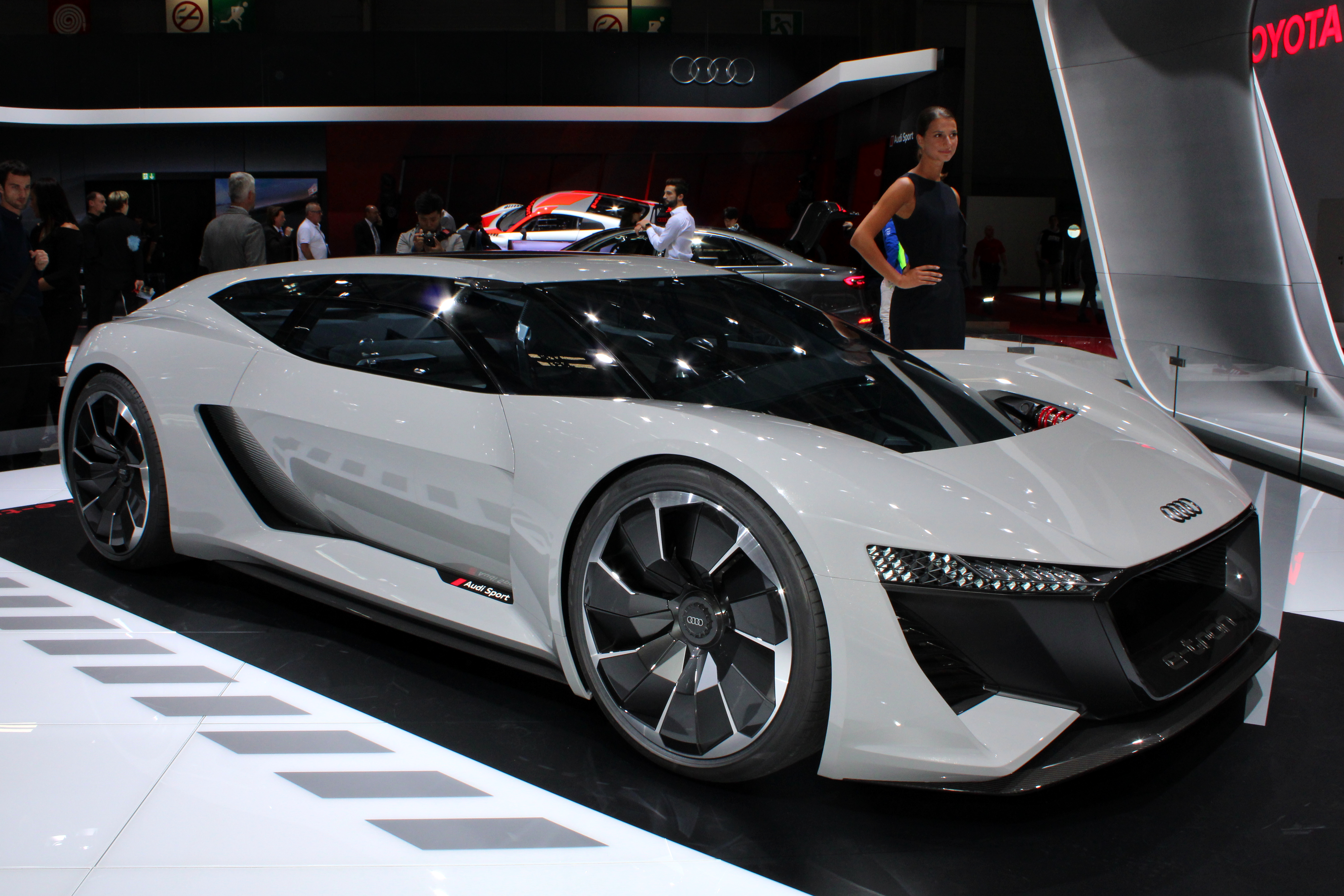

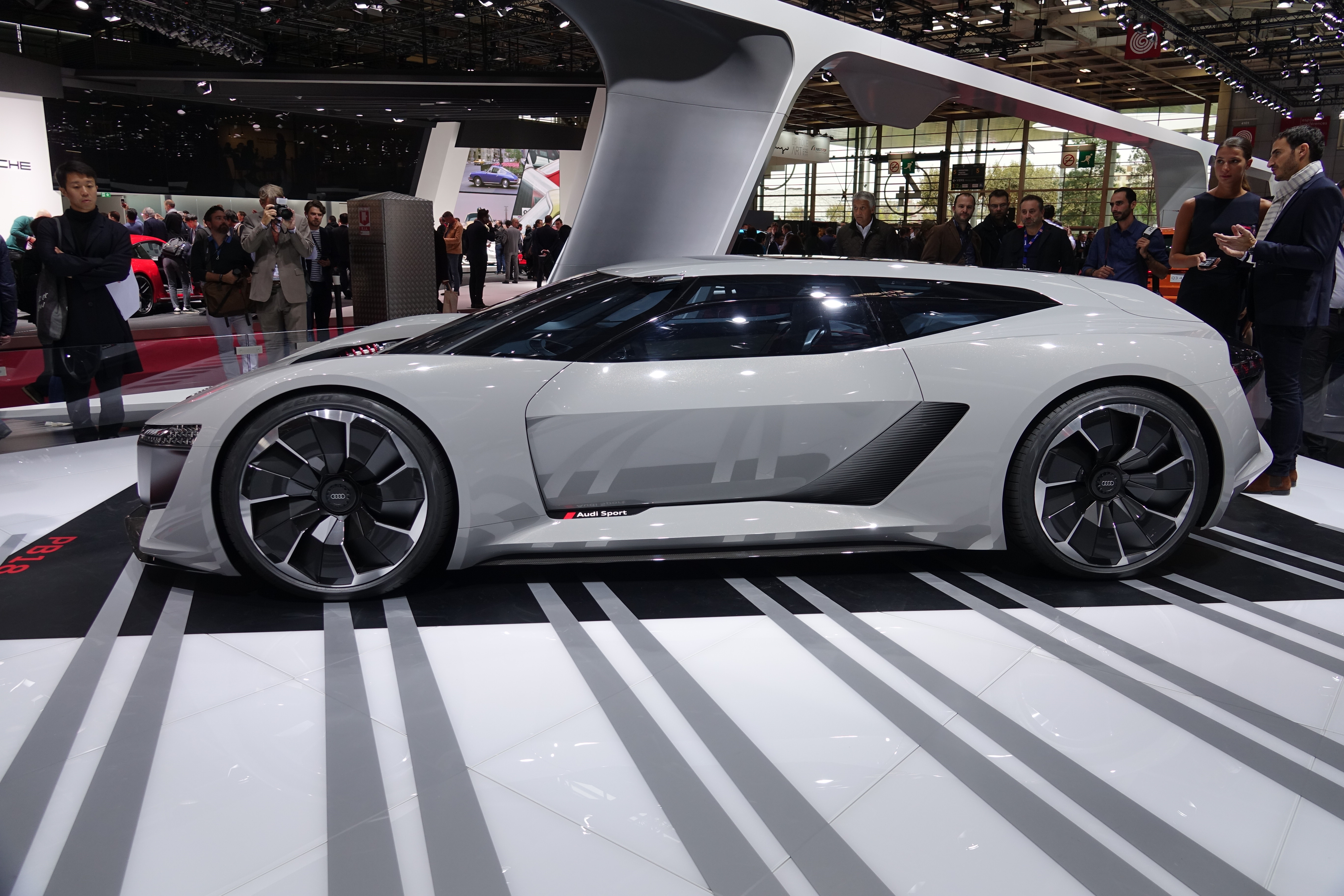

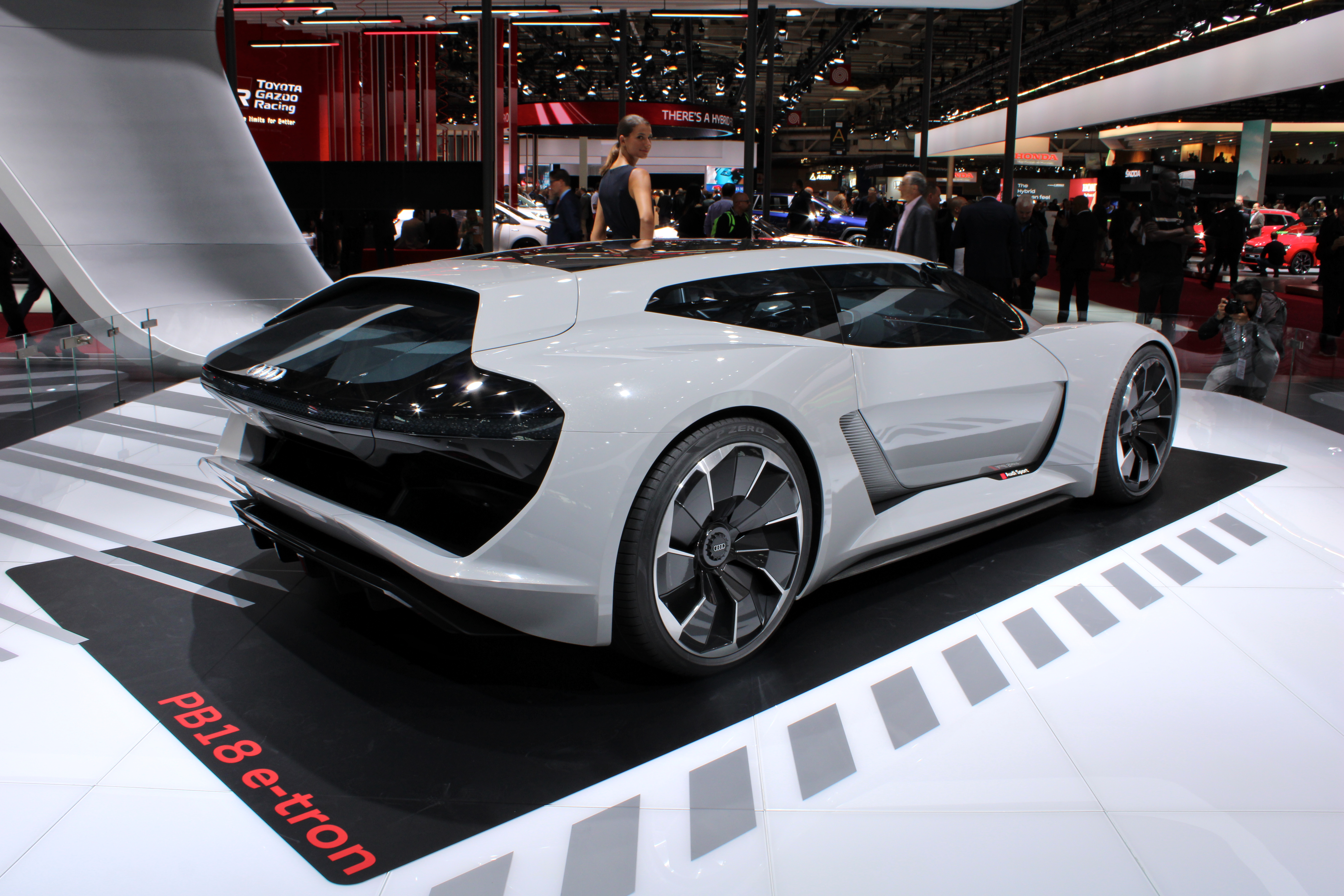

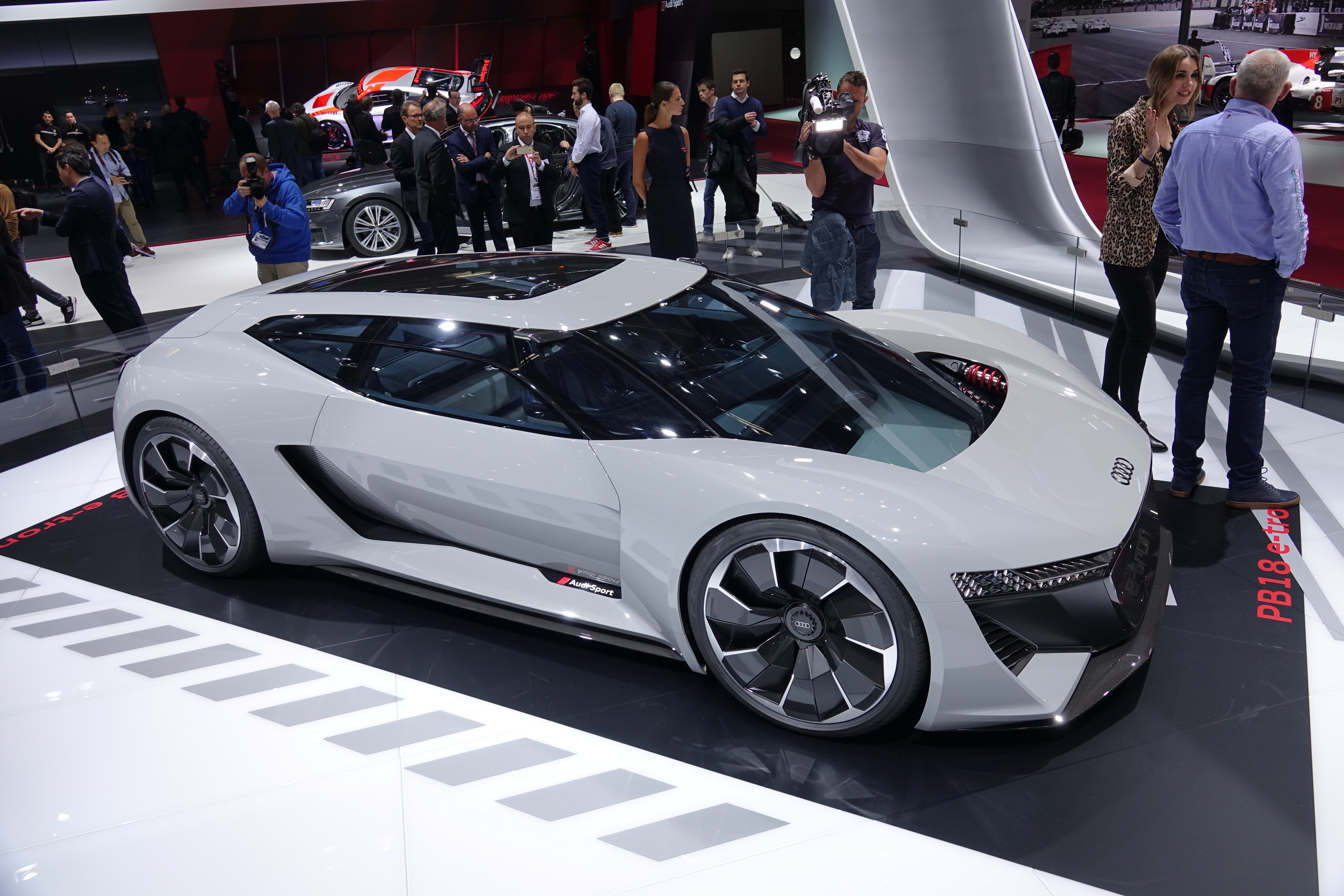
