= JATO Dynamics =

JATO Dynamics logo

JATO Dynamics Ltd is a global supplier of automotive business intelligence, headquartered in Uxbridge, London.

== History ==
JATO was founded in 1984 by Jake Shafran for collecting, and supplying competitive business intelligence for automotive manufacturers.
