= Audi Driving Experience =

Racing-track

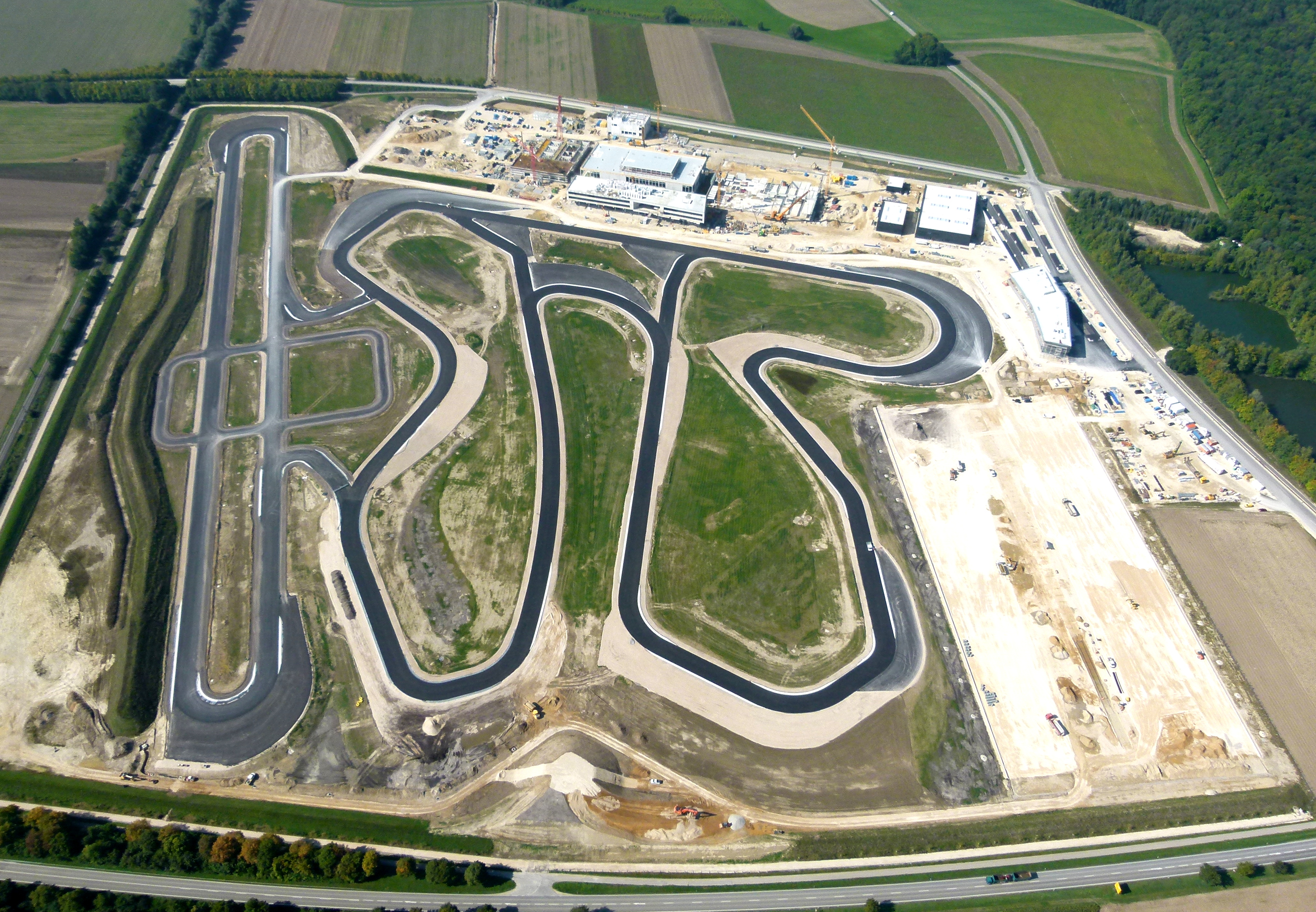
Audi driving experience center Luftaufnahme 2013

The Audi Driving Experience is a national racing-track-based driving tuition and education program initiated by Audi in 1983. Its aim is to educate drivers through both theoretical lessons and practical "hands-on" tuition, primarily focusing on the complexities of modern powertrains and chassis electronics found in virtually all of today's cars, with an emphasis on Audi vehicles.

The Audi Driving Experience includes emergency maneuvers using Anti-lock Braking System (ABS) and Electronic Stability Programme (ESP) systems, theory and practice of safe high-speed handling, and demonstrates and educates the abilities of Audi's trademark Quattro four-wheel drive system. These activities are all carried off away from public roads and highways.

AUDI AG provides all of the vehicles at each facility.

== Europe ==
The Audi Driving Experience originated in Audi's home country of Germany. It has its company headquarters in Ingolstadt.

== United Kingdom ==
In the United Kingdom, it is organised by Audi UK, and is based at the Silverstone motor racing circuit.

== United States ==
As of 2007, Audi of America and Emotive offer drivers the opportunity to drive Audi vehicles on a variety of courses.

== China ==
Launched on 2 September 2003, the Audi Driving Experience is a driver education and training scheme offered to the Chinese motoring public. Concentrating on three themes, or styles of driving, the courses include "defensive driving training", "advanced track training", and "winter rally training". It is based at two operational centers, operating from Shanghai and Zhuhai International Circuit.

== Russia ==
In Russia, Audi Drive Experience is presented by the "Vasin Driving School". Spent on the race track Moscow Raceway "Audi Sport Driving Experience 2017".

== Middle East ==
Based at the Dubai Autodrome since early 2008, the Audi Driving Experience was developed by Audi Middle East as a not-for-profit initiative.

== India ==
The Audi Driving Experience was introduced in India with its sports car experience on 5 July 2012 at the Buddh International Circuit, Greater Noida.
