= SH-AWD =

All-wheel-drive system by Honda

Super Handling-All Wheel Drive (SH-AWD) is an automatic, all-wheel drive traction and handling system. The system was announced in April 2004, and was introduced in the North American market in the second generation 2005 model year Acura RL, and in Japan as the fourth generation Honda Legend.

== Function ==
Current SH-AWD configurations are all mated to a transverse engine, either a turbo-charged in-line four-cylinder Honda K-Series engine in the case of the RDX, or naturally aspirated V-6 versions of the Honda J-Series engine. The engines are mated to a front-wheel drive transaxle without a center differential. The transaxle is bolted to torque transfer unit that spins a center drive shaft that powers the rear differential unit. The rear differential is a T-shaped device. Power coming from the engine is transferred via a central hypoid gear that delivers power to each rear axle. Power to each axle is modulated by identical planetary gear sets and electromagnetic clutch packs which can vary incoming power side to side.

SH-AWD can vary torque side to side through the rear wheels. This ability to drive one of the rear wheels with more power is accomplished through overdriving the rear wheels with respect to the front wheels. The Acura RL is designed with a third planetary gear set and clutch pack that are packaged into a so-called "Acceleration Device", which is bolted in front of the rear differential unit. The Acceleration Device allows torque to be passed to the rear wheels at a near one to one ratio, but in cornering situations, the Acceleration Device variably increases the torque passed to the rear up to 5%, depending on the cornering situation.

As of early 2010, SH-AWD has been implemented by Acura in two functionally similar, but mechanically different configurations, with and without Acceleration Device. The more complex SH-AWD version uses the Acceleration Device and can be found in:

- 2005–2008 Acura RL Sedan
- 2009–2010 Mid-Model Change Acura RL Sedan
- 2011–2012 Mid-Model Change Acura RL Sedan

The less complex version of SH-AWD omits the Acceleration Device and can be found in:

- 2007–2012;2019–Current Acura RDX CUV
- 2007–Current Acura MDX SUV
- 2009–2014 Acura TL SH-AWD Sedan
- 2010–2013 Acura ZDX SH-AWD Four-Door Sports Coupe
- 2015–2025 Acura TLX SH-AWD Sedan

SH-AWD in the Acura RDX and Acura MDX uses a default power split of 90% to the front and 10% to the rear. Like the unit in the RL, both can power the rear wheels with various amounts engine torque. The power split under straight-line, high-speed acceleration varies from vehicle to vehicle. In addition, in cornering situations, dependent on the specific vehicle balance and dynamics, the rearward power transfer ratios in the RDX and MDX differ greatly from the RL and TL sedans.

SH-AWD differs in function from other popular all-wheel drive systems, like Audi’s popular Quattro. For example, when it comes to torque distribution, SH-AWD is front-biased (with the exception of the performance oriented UB5 TLX Type S) but Audi's Quattro is rear-biased.

== See also ==
- 4Matic - a four-wheel-drive system from Mercedes-Benz
- ATTESA - a four-wheel-drive system from Nissan
- xDrive - a four-wheel drive for BMW
- Quattro (four-wheel-drive system) - a four-wheel-drive system from Audi
- S-AWC - a four-wheel-drive system from Mitsubishi Motors
- Saab XWD - a four-wheel-drive system from Saab
- 4motion - a four-wheel-drive system from Volkswagen
- All-Trac - a four-wheel-drive system from Toyota
- Symmetrical All Wheel Drive - the four wheel drive system from Subaru
