= Symmetrical All Wheel Drive =

Drivetrain developed by Subaru

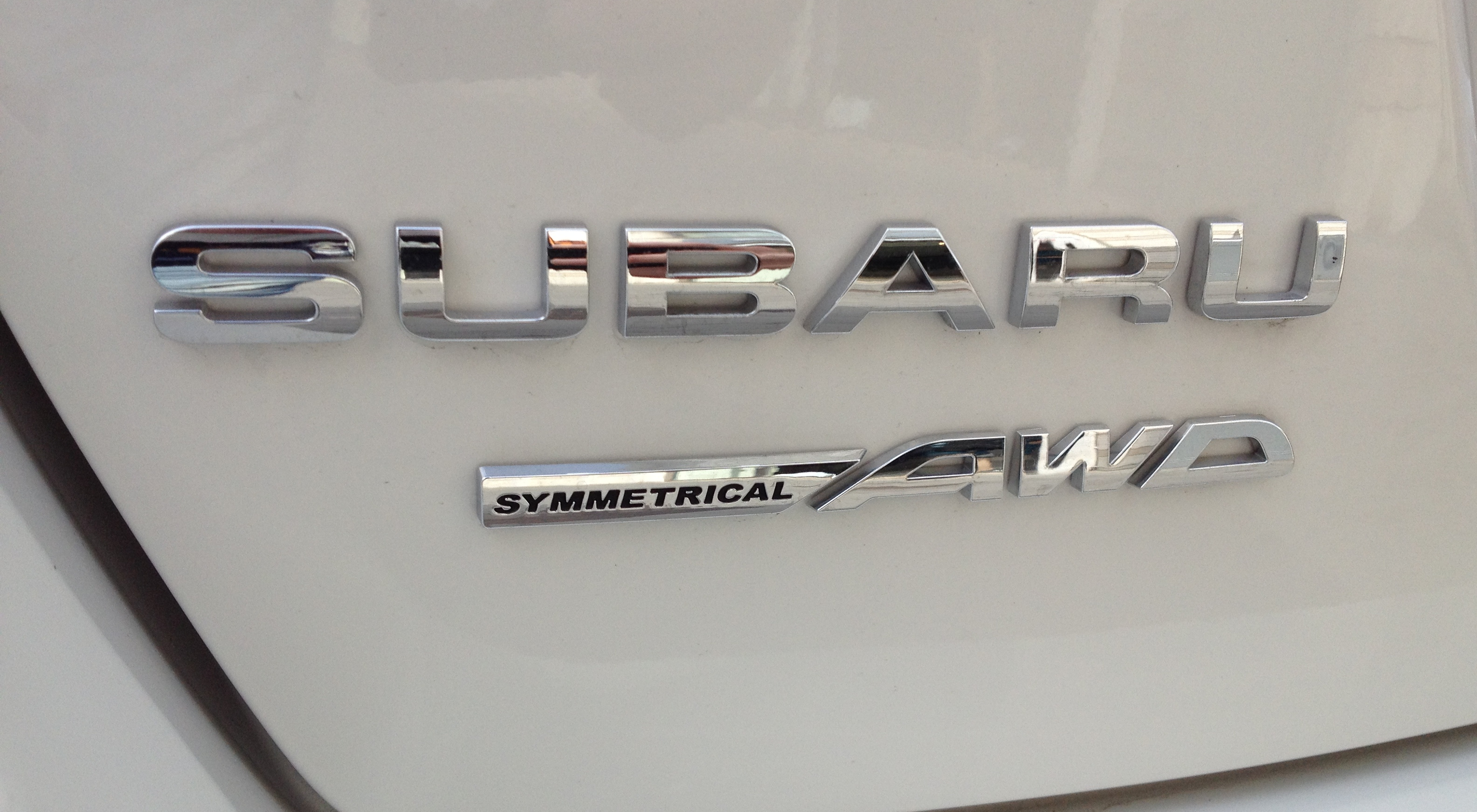
Symmetrical AWD emblem on a Subaru XV

The Symmetrical All-Wheel Drive (also known as Symmetrical AWD or SAWD) is a full-time four-wheel drive system developed by the Japanese automobile manufacturer Subaru. The system consists of a longitudinally mounted boxer engine coupled to a symmetrical drivetrain with equal length half-axles. The combination of the symmetrical layout with a flat engine and a transmission balanced over the front axle provides optimum weight distribution with low center of gravity, improving the steering characteristics of the vehicle. Ever since 1986, most of the Subaru models sold in the international market are equipped with the SAWD system by default, with the rear wheel drive BRZ and kei cars as the exceptions.

== History ==
The earliest version of the Subaru SAWD debuted in September 1972 as an optional part-time mechanical four-wheel drive system for the first-generation Subaru Leone Wagon. In 1986, the automatic non-turbocharged version of the Subaru XT was equipped with the first full-time SAWD system, with an electronically controlled version introduced in 1987. Variable Torque Distribution (VTD) AWD was first presented in 1991, with the addition of Vehicle Dynamics Control (VDC) in 1998, allowing for better control of the all-wheel drive system. Modern implementations of SAWD are used in conjunction with VDC, ABS, and traction control for enhanced handling performance.

== Variants ==
=== Active torque split AWD ===
First introduced in 1987 for the Subaru XT, the active torque split AWD variant uses an electronically controlled multi-plate transfer clutch for a default torque distribution of 60% front, 40% rear ratio. Torque distribution is adjusted up to a 50:50 split in real time with input from the throttle, transmission, engine control unit and wheel speed sensors. Active torque split AWD is paired with 4-speed automatic transmissions and Subaru's chain-driven Lineartronic continuously variable transmission (CVT).

=== Variable torque distribution AWD ===
The 1991 Subaru SVX was equipped with the first version of variable torque distribution (VTD) AWD with a normal torque split of 36% front, and 64% rear, later implementations of VTD use a torque split of 45% front, and 55% rear. The rear biased torque distribution reduces understeer, which occurs in AWD vehicles. VTD AWD uses a multi-plate clutch in conjunction with planetary gears in the center differential and a viscous coupling rear differential to distribute torque up to a 50:50 ratio. With the addition of VDC, all torque can be sent to a single wheel.

=== Viscous centre differential AWD ===
Subaru vehicles equipped with manual transmissions use a viscous limited-slip centre differential (VCD) AWD system, which by default distributes torque evenly between the front and rear axles.

=== Multi-mode Driver Control Centre Differential AWD ===
The Subaru WRX STI exclusively uses the Multi-mode Driver Control Centre Differential (DCCD) AWD system, it uses a torque sensing mechanical limited-slip differential (LSD) with an electronic LSD to distribute torque with a 41% front and 59% rear split. Multi-mode DCCD AWD is able to operate in automatic mode or manual mode, where the driver is able to adjust the center differential lockup on the fly.

== See also ==
- All-Trac - a four-wheel drive system from Toyota
- 4MATIC - a four-wheel drive system from Mercedes-Benz
- 4MOTION - Volkswagen's four-wheel drive system
- ATTESA - a four-wheel drive system from Nissan
- quattro - Audi branded four-wheel drive system
- S-AWC - a torque vectoring four-wheel drive system from Mitsubishi Motors
- SH-AWD - a four-wheel torque vectoring system from Honda
- xDrive - a four-wheel drive system from BMW
- HTRAC - a four-wheel drive system from Hyundai
- Saab XWD - an intelligent all-wheel drive system developed by Saab Automobile AB
