= Quattro (four-wheel-drive system) =

Sub-brand by Audi that designed for its all-wheel-drive cars

- Type: Division
- Industry: Automotive
- Founded: 1980
- Headquarters: Germany
- Area served: Worldwide
- Owner: Volkswagen Group
- Parent: Audi

Quattro (meaning four in Italian and stylized as quattro) is the trademark used by the automotive brand Audi to indicate that all-wheel drive (AWD) technologies or systems are used on specific models of its automobiles.

The word "quattro" is a registered trademark of Audi AG, a subsidiary of the German automotive enterprise, Volkswagen Group.

Quattro was first introduced in 1980 on the permanent four-wheel drive Audi Quattro model, often referred to as the Ur-Quattro (meaning "original" or "first"). The term quattro has since been applied to all subsequent Audi AWD models. Due to the nomenclature rights derived from the trademark, the word quattro is now always spelled with a lower case "q" by the manufacturer, in honour of its former namesake.

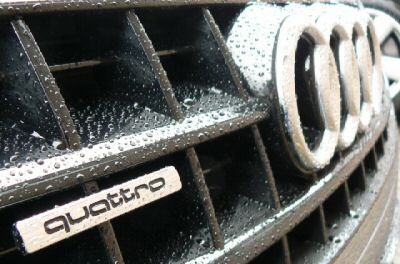
"quattro" logo badge on the grille of an Audi TT Mk1

Other companies in the Volkswagen Group have used different trademarks for their 4WD vehicles. While Audi has always used the term "quattro", Volkswagen-branded cars initially used "syncro", but more recently, VW uses "4motion". Škoda simply uses the nomenclature "4x4" after the model name, whereas SEAT uses merely "4" ("4Drive" more recently). None of the above trademarks or nomenclatures defines the operation or type of 4WD system, as detailed below.

== Longitudinal systems ==
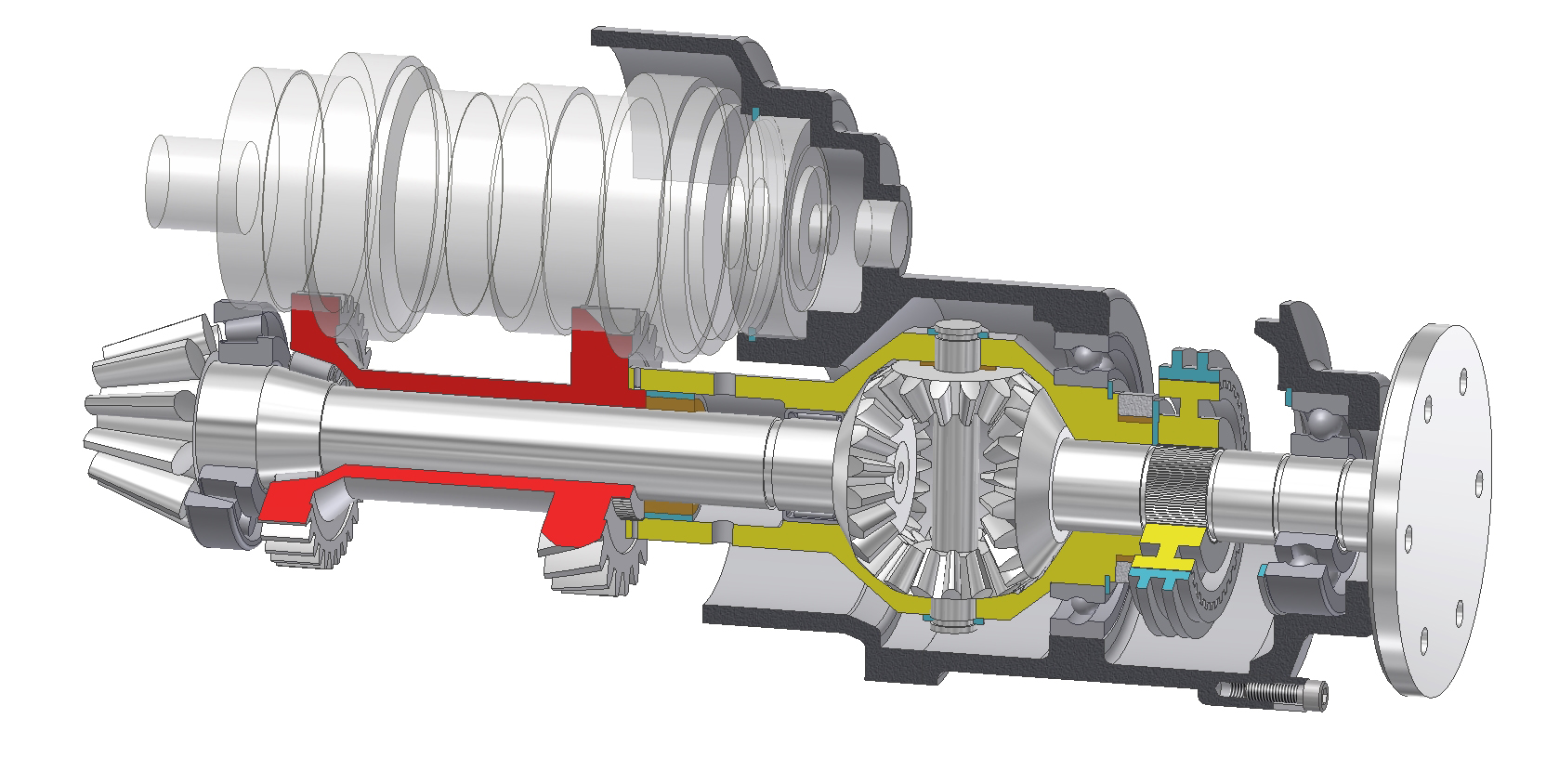
The original quattro centre differential (1980)

Volkswagen Group has been developing four-wheel drive (4WD) systems almost since its inception during the Second World War. The Volkswagen Kübelwagen, Volkswagen Schwimmwagen, and Volkswagen Kommandeurswagen were all military vehicles which required all four road wheels to be "driven", the latter being a 4WD Volkswagen Beetle. Their military and four-wheel drive experiences later aided them in designing the Volkswagen Iltis for the German military (Bundeswehr) in the 1970s. The Iltis utilized an early form of 4WD, which would later become synonymous with "quattro".

=== Locking centre differential ===
In that original quattro system, later found in road-going passenger cars, the engine and transmission are situated in a longitudinal position. Torque is sent through the transmission to a mechanical centre differential which distributes the torque between front and rear driven axles. 4WD was permanently active.

=== The Torsen T1 centre differential ===
After 1987, Audi replaced a manually locking centre differential with the Torsen (torque sensing) Type 1 ("T1") centre differential. This allowed engine torque to be automatically directed to individual axles as driving conditions and grip warranted. Under 'normal' conditions (where grip in both front and rear axles is equal), torque is split between front and rear with a 'default" 50:50 distribution in many, though not all, versions. In adverse conditions (i.e., when there is variation in grip between front and rear), a maximum of 90-100% (depending on the transmission, or model of Torsen diff) of the engine's torque can be directed to the front or rear axles. The fully automated mechanical nature of the Torsen centre differential helps prevent wheel slippage from occurring, by diverting torque instantly, without any discernible notice to the vehicle occupants, to the axle which has more grip. This method of operation can be described as proactive. Furthermore, unlike the various types of electronically operated differentials, Torsen has no requirement for electronic data from sources such as road wheel speed sensors; it, therefore, has an element of "fail-safe", unlike designs such as Haldex Traction, should one of the wheel speed sensors develop a fault. In comparison, viscous coupling and electronically controlled centre differentials that are used in other four-wheel drive systems are reactive, since they only redirect torque after wheel slippage has occurred. The advantage is felt under hard acceleration, including whilst cornering, since the torque transfer between axles is seamless, thus maintaining stable vehicle dynamics, and considerably reducing the chance of losing control of the vehicle.

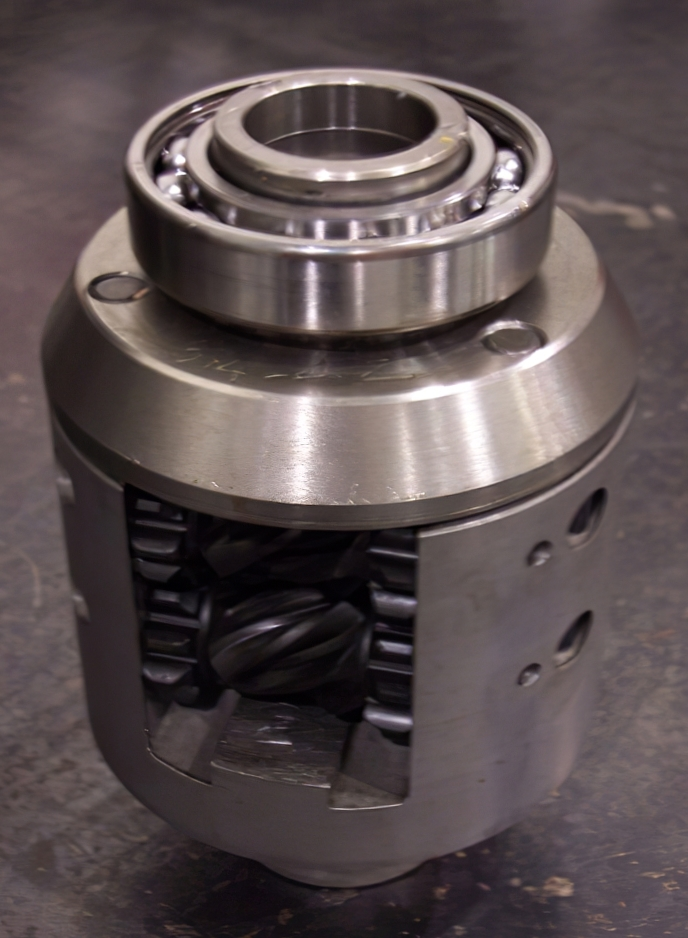
Audi quattro Torsen centre differential

The Torsen-based quattro system also offers an advantage in the opposite function of distributing torque to the road wheels, namely engine braking. When engine braking is used to slow the car down, with Torsen-based systems, the resulting "reverse-torque" loads on the front and rear axle are equally stabilized, in exactly the same way that engine "propulsion" torque is apportioned fully mechanically autonomously. This allows the spreading of the engine braking effect to all four wheels and tyres. The Torsen-based quattro-equipped vehicle is able to execute a more stable high-speed turn under deceleration, with less risk of losing control due to loss of grip in the front or rear axles.

This configuration of the quattro system, however, does have some limitations:

1. With placement of the engine and transmission assembly in a fore/aft position (longitudinally), the front axle is placed rearwards behind the engine, which leads to the criticism of some Audi vehicles as being nose heavy. This results in a weight distribution of 55:45 (F:R).
2. The nature of the Torsen is akin to that of a limited slip differential in that, rather than actively allocating torque (as a computer controlled clutch can do), it supports a torque difference across the differential (the torque bias ratio/TBR), from the side with the least grip to the side with the most. Hence by nature the Torsen is limited in the amount of torque that can be supplied to the axle with the most grip by the torque available at the axle with the least amount of grip. Therefore, if one axle has no grip, regardless of the TBR, the other axle will not be supplied substantial torque. In the extreme, for a centre differential implementation, complete loss of traction on a single wheel will result in very limited torque to the other three wheels. Audi responded to this limitation for the first Torsen-equipped cars by adding a manually locking rear differential and then later replaced this feature with Electronic Differential Lock (EDL), which is the ability to use the individual wheel brakes (monitored by the ABS sensors) to limit individual wheel spin. EDL was implemented across both front and rear (open) differentials to operate at speeds less than 80 km/h. This has the effect of increasing torque from a single low-traction wheel hence allowing more torque to be passed by the Torsen to the remaining high-traction wheels.
3. While the standard (Type 1 or T1) Torsen supports a static torque ratio of 50:50; i.e., input torque is supported equally across both output shafts, the T1 has a Torque Bias Ratio (TBR) of 2.7–4:1; i.e., it allows about 3 to 4 times the torque to be supplied to the most tractive output shaft than that is available on the least tractive shaft or, a torque split of between 25% and 75%. However, by nature the T1 Torsen is locked under most circumstances (output shafts locked together). Only when the TBR is reached (i.e., there is a greater torque difference across the output shafts than can be supported by the TBR) do the output shafts turn relative to each other, and the differential unlocks. This characteristic results in a relatively free torque movement between both outputs of the (centre) differential, within the limits of the TBR. Thus the static torque distribution of the T1 Torsen in a centre differential installation, rather than being 50:50, will mirror the weight distribution (both static and dynamic) of the vehicle due to the traction available at either (front:rear) output shaft. In a standard car, this is desirable from the perspective of stability, acceleration and traction, but can be undesirable in terms of handling (understeer). While the standard quattro Torsen T1 with 2.7:1 TBR is more than sufficient in most conditions, Torsen T1 differentials with higher TBRs (4:1) are available and can further limit understeer by supporting a wider torque split. A better solution, however, is to apportion a torque split directly between both output shafts (front & rear) and for this reason Audi has adopted the Type 3 (T3) Torsen design in the latest generations of quattro.

=== The Torsen type "C" (T3) ===
The Torsen T3 centre differential combines a planetary gear set with a Torsen differential in a compact package developed for centre differential installations. Unlike the T1 Torsen where the torque split is a nominal 50:50, in the T3 Torsen the torque split, due to the use of the planetary gear set, is an asymmetric 40:60 front-rear torque split (i.e., when grip is equal on both front and rear axles, 40% of torque is sent to the front axle, and 60% to the rear). As with the T1 Torsen, torque will be distributed dynamically depending on tractive conditions, but with an actual (rather than nominal) static bias. The T3 allows handling characteristics and vehicle dynamics more akin to rear-wheel drive cars. This asymmetric Torsen was first introduced in the highly acclaimed 2006-model (B7) Audi RS4. The Type 3 torsen was used in the Audi S4 and RS4 B7 manual transmissions from 2006 to 2008, as well as the S6, S8, and Q7 models from 2007.

The torque split across axles and between left and right wheels has been achieved through the various evolutions of the quattro system, through a driver-selectable manually locking differential (rear axle only), and eventually through open differentials with Electronic Differential Lock (EDL). EDL is an electronic system, utilising the existing anti-lock braking system (ABS), part of the Electronic Stability Programme (ESP), which brakes just the one spinning wheel on an axle, therefore allowing the transfer of torque across the axle to the wheel which does have traction.

=== Crown-wheel centre differential ===
Audi debuted a new generation of quattro in the 2010 RS5. The key change is the replacement of the Torsen Type "C" centre differential with an Audi-developed "Crown Gear" differential. Whilst this is superficially the same as a normal open differential, adapted for a centre application, it has some key differences:

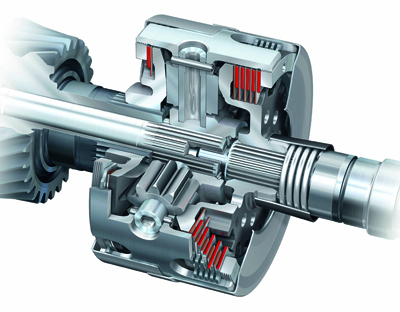
Audi quattro Crown Gear centre differential

1. The central carrier and associated spider gears interface directly to two crown wheels connected to the front and rear drive shafts
2. The two crown wheels interface to the spider gears at different diameters, and so produce different torque when turned by the spider gears. This is engineered to produce a 40:60 static torque split front and rear.
3. Each crown wheel interfaces to the respective output shaft directly, whilst the spider carrier interfaces to each output shaft using a clutch pack which gives the unit the ability to control torque distribution over and above the static torque distribution.

If one axle loses grip, different rotational speeds arise inside the differential which result in an increase in axial forces that force the clutch plates to close. Once closed, the output shaft is locked resulting in the diversion of the majority of the torque to the axle achieving better traction. In the Crown Gear differential up to 85% of torque can flow to the rear, and up to 70% of torque can be diverted to the front axle.

The features of the Crown Gear differential provide the following benefits over the Torsen Type "C"

1. The ability to set up a more stable torque distribution, with full locking whereas the Torsen can only provide a torque distribution up to the Torque Bias Ratio; i.e., the Crown Gear differential can lock fully, regardless of bias ratio. Unlike the Torsen, the Crown Gear differential does not operate like a limited slip differential and can operate, fully locked, with no traction on one output shaft.
2. Easier integration into control electronics allowing four-wheel electronic torque vectoring with or without the active rear sport differential
3. Considerable reduction in size and weight (at 4.8 kg, some 2 kg lighter than the Torsen Type C)

The net result of this advance in quattro is the ability of the vehicle electronics to fully manage the vehicle dynamics in all traction situations, whether in cornering, acceleration or braking or in any combination of these.

=== Evolutions ===
Audi has never officially debuted quattro in specific generations. Changes to quattro technology have generally been debuted with a specific range or model in the range and then brought into other models during appropriate points in the model cycle.

The exception to the above was the debut of the 2010 RS5 which was, amongst other things, heralded by Audi as the debut of a "new generation of quattro".

==== quattro generation I ====
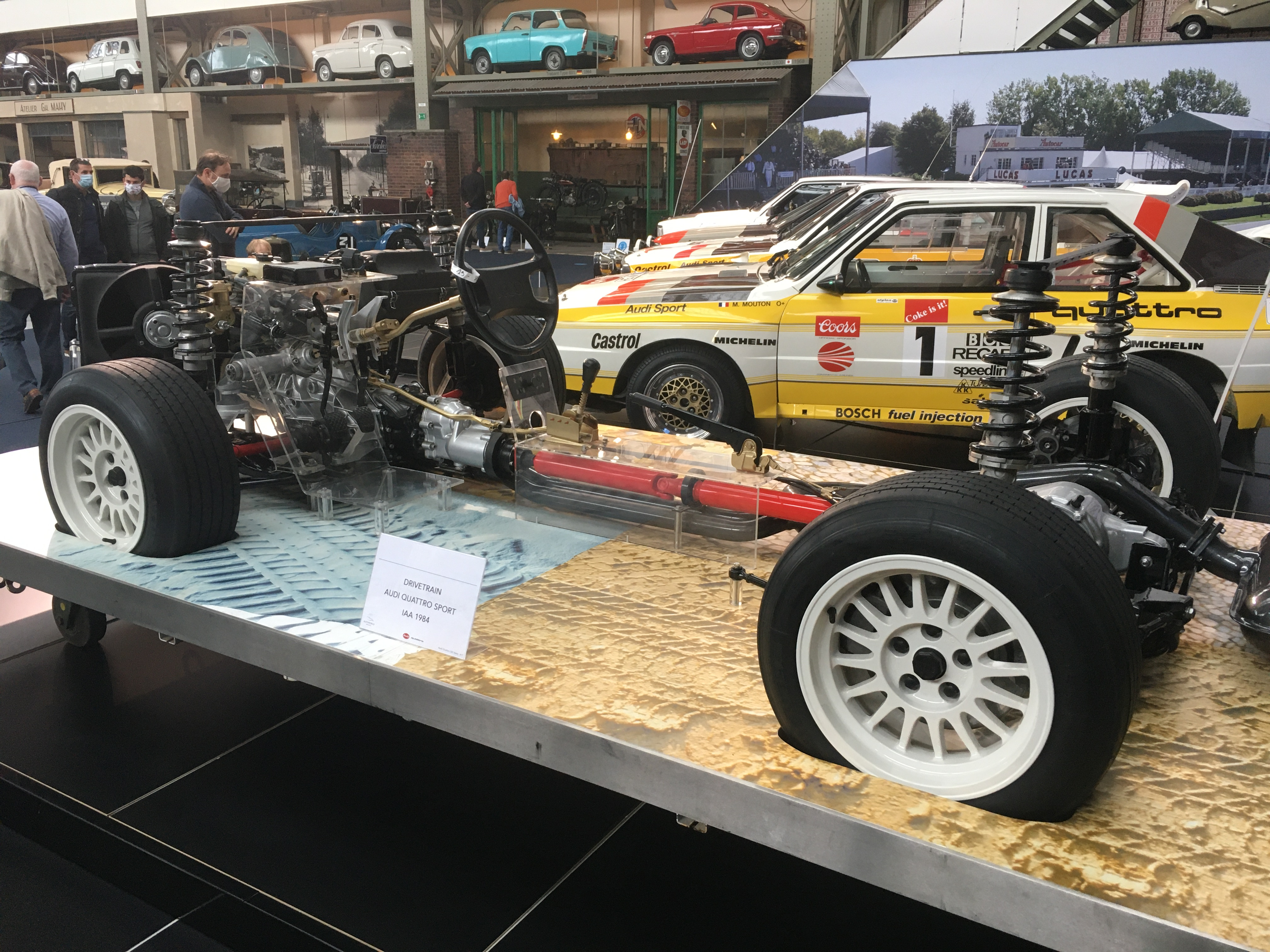
Demonstration of the first quattro generation

Used from 1981 to 1987 in Audi Quattro turbo coupé, Audi 80 B2 platform (1978–1987, Audi 4000 in North American market), Audi Coupé quattro B2 platform (1984–1988), Audi 100 C3 platform (1983–1987, Audi 5000 in North American market). Also, starting from 1984, used on the Volkswagen VW Passat B2 platform (VW Quantum in the US market) where it was known as Syncro.

System type: Permanent four-wheel drive.

Open centre differential, manually lockable via switch on centre console.¹

Open rear differential, manually lockable via switch on centre console.¹

Open front differential, no lock.

¹ABS disabled when locked.

How the system performs: When all differentials are unlocked, the car will not be able to move if one wheel (front or rear) loses traction (is on ice or raised in the air). When the center differential is locked with the rear differential unlocked, the car will not be able to move if one front wheel and one rear wheel lose traction. When the rear differential is locked with the center unlocked, the car will not be able to move if both rears or one front loses traction. When both center and rear differentials are locked, the car will not be able to move if both rears and one front lose traction.

==== quattro generation II ====
Starting from 1986 on new generation B3 platform (1986–1991) Audi 80/90 quattro, on older generation Audi 100 C3 platform and Audi Quattro until the end of their production, and B4 platform (1991–1995) Audi 80, Audi S2, Audi RS2 Avant, C4 platform (1991–1994) Audi 100 quattro, Audi S4.

System type: Permanent four-wheel drive.

Torsen centre differential, 50:50 'default' split, automatically apportioning up to 71.5% of torque transfer to either axle.

Open rear differential, manually lockable via switch on centre console located next to handbrake.¹

Open front differential, no lock.

¹ABS disabled when locked, automatically unlocks if speed exceeds 25 km/h (16 mph).

==== quattro generation III ====
Used only on the Audi V8 starting from 1988 to 1994.

System type: Permanent/ Part-time four-wheel drive.

V8 with automatic transmission:

Planetary gear centre differential with electronically controlled multi-plate locking clutch

Torsen type 1 differential rear.

Open differential front.

V8 with manual transmission:

Torsen type 1 centre differential.

Torsen type 1 rear differential.

Open front differential.

How does the system perform: In on-road conditions the car will not be able to move if one front and both rear wheels lose traction altogether.

==== quattro generation IV ====
Starting from 1995 on Audi A4/S4/RS4 (B5 platform), Audi A6/S6/allroad/RS6, Audi A8/S8 with both manual and automatic transmissions. Also on VW Passat B5, where it was initially referred to as syncro, but by the time it reached US soil, it had been re-christened 4motion. Also used on the Volkswagen Phaeton and Volkswagen Group D platform sister vehicles. The Volkswagen Touareg used 4Xmotion with a separate transmission, PTUs and front axles.

The manually locking rear differential from the earlier generations was replaced with a conventional open differential, with Electronic Differential Lock (EDL) (which detects wheelspin via ABS road wheel speed sensors, and applies brakes to one spinning wheel, thus transferring torque via open differential to the opposite wheel which has more traction). EDL works at speeds up to 80 km/h (50 mph), on all quattro models (on non-quattro models: up to 40 km/h (25 mph)).

System type: Permanent four-wheel drive.

Torsen type 1 centre differential, 50:50 'default' split, automatically apportioning up to 75% of torque transfer to either front or rear axle.

Open rear differential, Electronic Differential Lock (EDL).

Open front differential, Electronic Differential Lock (EDL).

==== quattro generation V ====
Starting with the B7 Audi RS4 and the manual transmission version of the 2006 B7 Audi S4. It was adopted in the entire S4, S6, and S8 lineup in 2007.

System type: Permanent asymmetric four-wheel drive.

Torsen type 3 (Type "C") centre differential, 40:60 'default' split front-rear, automatically apportioning up to 80% of the torque to one axle using a 4:1 high-biased center differential. With the aid of ESP, up to 100% of the torque can be transferred to one axle.

Open rear differential, Electronic Differential Lock (EDL).

Open front differential, Electronic Differential Lock (EDL).

===== Vectoring quattro system =====
Audi's new sport differential, debuted 'torque vectoring' to quattro generation V. The Audi sport differential allowed the dynamic allocation of torque across the rear axle of the debut vehicle: the B7 (2008) S4, and is now an optional addition to all quattro vehicles, which continue to use the 40:60 asymmetric Torsen (Type "C") centre differential. The sport differential replaces the normal open rear differential while the front axle still rely on an open differential with EDL.

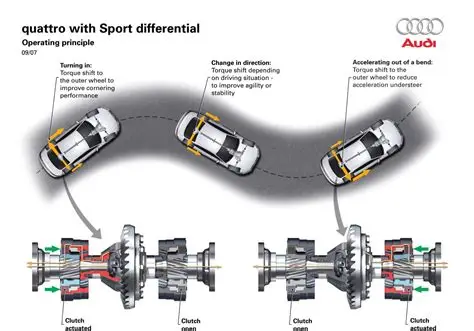
Diagram showing how Audi’s quattro Sport differential distributes torque between wheels during cornering, direction changes, and acceleration to improve agility, stability, and traction.

The torque vectoring rear axle differential is designed and manufactured by Magna Powertrain, and is being offered on Audi A4, A5, A6 and their derivatives (including RS models). The Sport Differential selectively distributes torque to the rear axle wheels thereby generating a yaw moment, which improves handling and also stabilizes the vehicle when it oversteers or understeers, thereby increasing safety.

The sport differential operates by using two superposition ("step up") gears at the differential, which are operated via multi-plate clutches each side of the differential crown wheel. When required by the software (using lateral and longitudinal yaw sensors, the ABS wheel sensors, and a steering wheel sensor), the control software (located in a control unit close to the rear differential), actuates the relevant clutch pack. This has the effect of taking the output shaft drive through the step-up gear to the attached wheel, while the other shaft continues to drive its wheel directly (i.e., the clutch pack not actuated). The higher speed output shaft produces increased torque to the wheel, producing a yaw (turning) moment. In normal operation increased torque is delivered to the wheel on the outside of the turn thereby increasing the vehicles turning moment, in other words, its willingness to turn in the direction pointed by the steering wheel.

==== quattro generation VI ====
Audi debuted the 6th generation of quattro in the 2010 RS5. The key change in generation VI is the replacement of the Torsen Type "C" centre differential with an Audi-developed "Crown Gear" differential. With the new "Crown Gear" center differential, up to 70% of the torque can be applied to the front wheels while up to 85% can be applied to the rear wheels if necessary. The net result of this advance in quattro is the ability of the vehicle electronics to fully manage the vehicle dynamics in all traction situations, whether in cornering, acceleration, braking, snow or in any combination of these. This system was later adopted by the A7, latest generation of the A6 and A8.

=== BorgWarner ===
The Audi Q7 (First generation), the platform-mate of the Volkswagen Touareg and Porsche Cayenne, does not use the same underpinnings of either previous model. BorgWarner instead provides the 4WD system for this more off-road appropriate SUV. A Torsen Type 3 (T3) differential is used.

=== Ultra ===
Audi announced "Audi Quattro with Ultra Technology" in February 2016, it is a front-wheel drive biased system for use on platforms with longitudinally mounted engines.

== Transverse systems ==
Since Volkswagen Group's first mainstream transverse engined vehicle in 1974, four-wheel drive (4WD) has also been considered for their A-platform family of cars. It was not until the second generation of this platform that 4WD finally appeared on the market. The mid-1980s Mk2 Golf syncro, with its transverse engine and transmission positioning, had most of its torque sent primarily to the front axle.

Attached to the transaxle is a Power Transfer Unit (PTU), which is connected to a rear axle through a propeller shaft. The PTU also feeds torque through itself to the front axle. At the rear axle, torque was first sent through a viscous coupling before reaching the final drive gearset. This coupling contained friction plates and an oil just viscous enough so that pressure affected how many plates were connected and active (and therefore, how much power was being delivered to the rear wheels).

Starting with the Mk4 generation A4-platform, the viscous coupling has been dropped in favour of a Haldex Traction electro-hydraulic limited-slip "coupler" (LSC) or clutch. The Haldex Traction LSC unit is not a differential and therefore cannot perform in the true sense like a differential. A Haldex Traction unit may divert up to a maximum 100% of the torque to the rear axle as conditions warrant. Many people are confused with the torque distribution on Haldex-based systems. Under normal operating conditions the Haldex clutch operates a rate of 5% torque transmission. Under adverse conditions where the car's road wheel speed sensors have determined that both front wheels have lost traction, the Haldex clutch can lock at 100% clamping force, meaning all torque is transferred to the rear axle. The torque split between left and right wheels is achieved with a conventional open differential. If one side of the driven axle loses grip, then the Electronic Differential Lock (EDL) component of the ESP controls this. EDL brakes a single spinning wheel; therefore, the torque gets transferred across the axle to the opposite wheel via the open differential. On all transverse engine cars with the Haldex-based four wheel drive system, the EDL only controls front wheels, and not the rear.

The main advantages of the Haldex Traction LSC system over the Torsen-based system include: a slight gain in fuel economy (due to the decoupling of the rear axle when not needed, thereby reducing driveline losses due to friction), and the ability to maintain a short engine bay and larger passenger compartment due to the transverse engine layout. A further advantage of the Haldex, when compared to just front wheel drive variants of the same model, is a more balanced front-rear weight distribution (due to the location of the Haldex center "differential" next to the rear axle).

Disadvantages of the Haldex Traction system include: the vehicle has inherent front-wheel drive handling characteristics (as when engine braking, load is only applied on the front wheels, and due to the reactive nature of the Haldex system and slight lag time in the redistribution of engine power), and the Haldex LSC unit also requires additional maintenance, in the form of an oil and filter change every 60,000 kilometres (37,000 mi) (whereas the Torsen is generally considered to be maintenance-free). Another important disadvantage of the Haldex system is the requirement for all four tyres to be of identical wear levels (and rolling radii), due to the Haldex requiring data from all four road wheel speed sensors. A final significant disadvantage is the reduction in luggage capacity in the boot (trunk), due to the bulky Haldex LSC unit necessitating a raised boot floor by some three inches.

=== Viscous coupling ===
This 4WD system was used only on Volkswagen branded vehicles, and was never used on any Audi cars except Audi R8 models.

The aforementioned viscous coupling 4WD system was found in the Mk2 generation of transverse-engined A2-platform vehicles, including the Volkswagen Golf Mk2 and Jetta. It was also found on the Volkswagen Type 2 (T3) (Vanagon in the US), Mk3 generation of Golf and Jetta, third generation of Volkswagen Passat B3 (which was based on a heavily revised A-platform), and the Volkswagen Eurovan.

The Vanagon system was RWD-biased, the engine and transaxle were in the rear, whereas the viscous coupling was found in the front axle near the final drive. This 4WD system was known as Syncro on all vehicles.

What: Automatic four wheel drive (on demand).

A viscous coupling installed instead of a centre differential, with freewheel mechanism to disconnect the driven axle when braking.

Open rear differential (mechanical differential lock optional on Vanagon).

Open front differential (mechanical differential lock optional on Vanagon).

Normally a front-wheel drive vehicle (except Vanagon, see above). In normal driving conditions, 95% of torque is transferred to front axle. Because viscous coupling is considered to be "slow" (some time is needed for silicone fluid to warm-up and solidify), 5% of torque is transferred to rear axle at all times to "pre-tension" the viscous coupling and reduce activation time. The coupling locks when slipping occurs and up to near 50% of torque is automatically transferred to rear axle (front in Vanagon). In on-road conditions, the car will not move if one front wheel and one rear wheel lose traction.

The freewheel segment, installed inside the rear differential, lets rear wheels rotate faster than front wheels without locking the viscous coupling and preventing ABS from applying brakes to each wheel independently. Because of the freewheel, torque can be transferred to rear axle only when the vehicle is moving forward. For four-wheel drive to work when reversing, a vacuum-actuated "throttle control element" is installed on the differential case. This device locks the freewheel mechanism when in reverse gear. The freewheel mechanism unlocks when the gear-shift lever is pushed to the right, past the third gear. The freewheel is not unlocked immediately after leaving reverse gear on purpose – this is to prevent the freewheel from cycling from locked to unlocked if the car is stuck and driver is trying to "rock" the car by changing from first to reverse and back.

Disadvantages of this four-wheel drive system are related to actuation time of the viscous coupling.

1. When cornering under acceleration on a slippery surface, the rear axle is engaged with delay, causing sudden change in the car's behaviour (from understeer to oversteer).
2. When starting on a sandy surface, the front wheels can dig into the sand before all-wheel drive is engaged.

=== Haldex ===
Starting from 1998, the Swedish Haldex Traction LSC unit replaced the viscous coupling. Haldex is used by Audi on the quattro versions of the Audi S1, Audi A3, Audi S3, and the Audi TT. It is also used by Volkswagen in the 4motion versions of the Mk4 and Mk5 generations of Volkswagen Golf, Volkswagen Jetta, and the Golf R32, Volkswagen Sharan, 6th generation VW Passat (also based on the A-platform) and Transporter T5. On the Audis, the trademark holds, and are still referred to as quattro, whereas the Volkswagens receive the 4motion name. The Škoda Octavia 4x4 and SEAT León 4 and SEAT Alhambra 4 also used Haldex LSC, being based on Volkswagen Group models. Curiously, the Bugatti Veyron also utilizes Haldex, though with separate transmission, PTU and front and rear axles.

What: Automatic four wheel drive (on demand).

Haldex Traction LSC multi-plate clutch with ECU electronic control, acting as a pseudo center differential.

Open rear differential, no EDL.

Open front differential, EDL.

How: Normally front-wheel drive vehicle. A Haldex Traction LSC unit may divert up to a maximum 100% of the torque to the rear axle as conditions warrant. Many people find the torque distribution on Haldex Traction systems confusing. Under normal operating conditions, the Haldex LSC clutch operates at 5% (divide 5% between front and rear, and 97.5% torque goes to the front, and 2.5% goes to the rear). Under adverse conditions where both front wheels lose traction, the Haldex clutch can lock at 100% clamping force. This means, that since there is no torque transferred to the front axle, all torque (minus losses) must be transferred to the rear axle. The torque split between left and right wheels is achieved with a conventional open differential. If one side of the driven axle loses grip, then the Electronic Differential Lock (EDL) controls this. EDL brakes a single spinning wheel, and therefore torque gets transferred to the opposite wheel via the open differential. On all transverse-engined cars with the Haldex Traction LSC four-wheel drive system, the EDL only controls the front wheels, and not the rear.

In vehicles equipped with EDL on the front wheels only, the car will not move if both front and one of the rear wheels loses traction.

Again, due to limitations of Electronic Differential Lock (see quattro IV description above), in off-road conditions it is enough for one front and one rear wheel to lose traction and the car will not move.

The Haldex Traction system is more reactive than preventative, in that there must be a difference in slip (or rotational speed) of the two axle systems before the Haldex operates and sends torque to the rear axle. This is not the same as wheel spin, as the system can react in less than the full rotation of any wheel on the vehicle. The Torsen's permanent 'full-time' even torque split under non-slipping conditions makes slipping less likely to start.

The Haldex Electronic Control Unit (ECU) disengages the Haldex clutch in the centre coupling as soon as brakes are applied to allow ABS work properly. When performing tight low-speed turns (e.g. parking) the clutch is disengaged by Electronic Control Unit to avoid "wind-up" in transmission. When Electronic Stability Programs (ESP) are activated the Haldex is disengaged to allow the ESP system to effectively control the vehicle, this applies under acceleration and deceleration conditions.

== Marketing ==
As part of Audi's celebration of quattro All-Wheel Drive technology, a TV commercial titled 'Ahab' was produced inspired by the American novel, Moby Dick. The ad debuted in the United States during 2012 NFL division playoffs.

The quattro system has been marketed with the Audi Gecko mascot since 2005, including print and television ads, and a videogame for the PlayStation console.

== See also ==
- 4motion - Volkswagen branded four wheel drive system.
- 4Matic - a four-wheel drive system from Mercedes-Benz
- All-Trac - a four-wheel drive system from Toyota
- ATTESA - a four-wheel drive system from Nissan
- S-AWC - a torque vectoring all-wheel drive system from Mitsubishi Motors
- SH-AWD - a torque vectoring all-wheel drive system from Honda
- BMW xDrive - a four-wheel drive system from BMW
- Four-wheel drive - a history of all-wheel drive in passenger cars
- Symmetrical All Wheel Drive - the four wheel drive system from Subaru
