= Audi RS 4 =

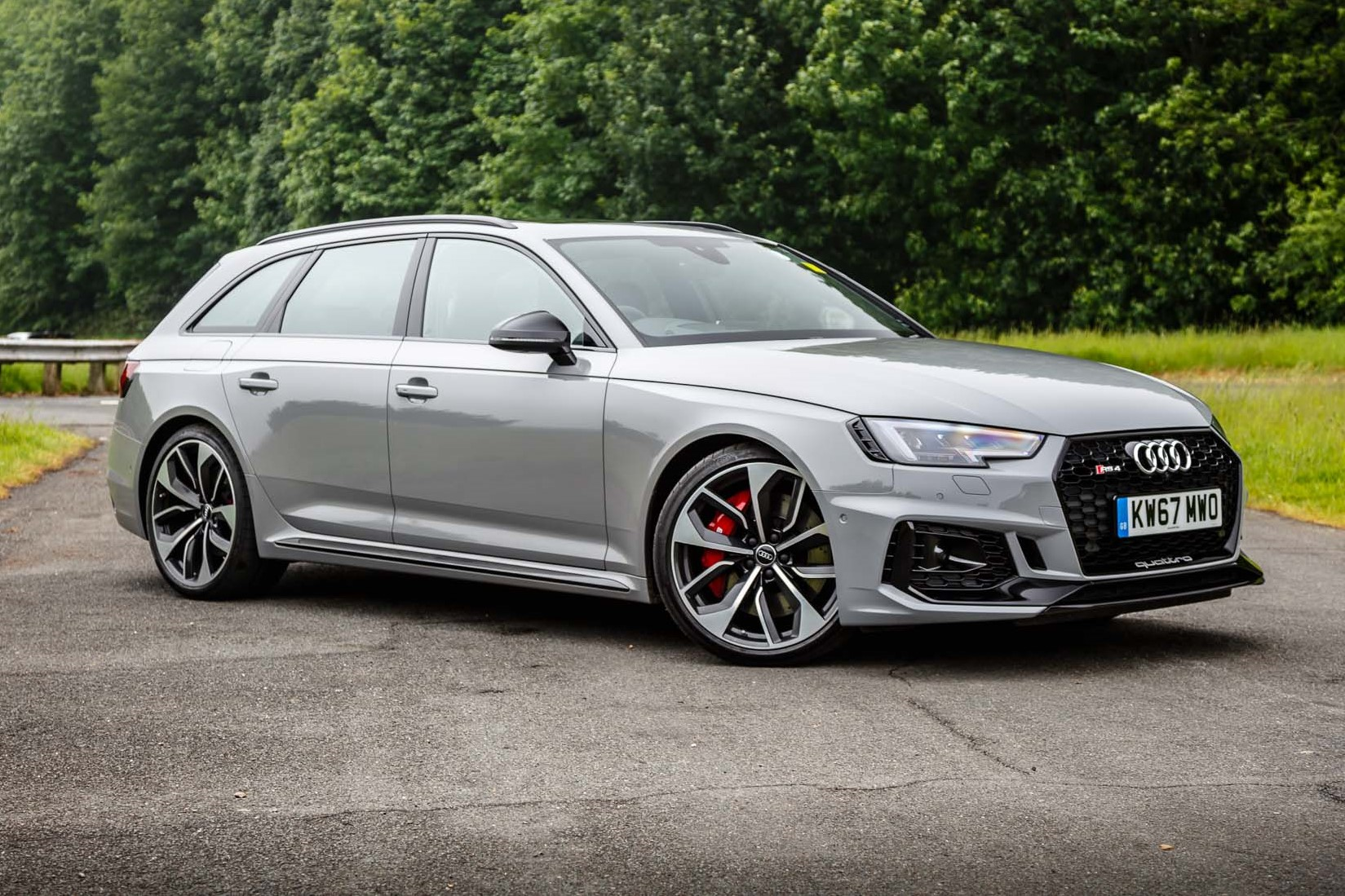
- Audi RS 4 Avant (B9)

Overview
- Manufacturer: Audi Sport GmbH (a private subsidiary of AUDI AG)
- Production: 1999–2001; 2006–2008; 2012–2015; 2018–2025

Body and chassis
- Class: Compact executive car (D)
- Layout: Longitudinal F4 layout (quattro)
- Platform: Volkswagen Group B platform series
- Related: Audi A4; Audi S4

The Audi RS 4 is the high-performance variant of the Audi A4 range produced by Audi Sport GmbH for AUDI AG, a division of the Volkswagen Group. It sits above the Audi S4 as the fastest, most sports-focused car based on the A4's "B" automobile platform. The RS 4 was reintroduced in 2012, based on the A4 Avant instead of the sedan as did the original model.

The original B5 version was produced only as an Avant, Audi's name for an estate car/station wagon. The second version, the B7, was released initially as a four-door five-seat saloon/sedan, with the Avant following a short while later. A two-door four-seat Cabriolet version was subsequently added.

The "RS" initials are taken from the German RennSport—literally translated as "racing sport", and is the Audi marque's highest trim level, positioned above the "S" model specification of Audi's regular model line-up. Like other Audi "RS" cars, the RS 4 pioneers some of Audi's latest advanced technology. It is only available with Audi's Torsen-based "trademark" quattro permanent four-wheel drive system.

RS4 models have been produced for every generation of the A4 since 1999, with occasional gaps in production (2001-2006, 2008-2012 and 2015-2018)

Its main market competitors include the BMW M3, Mercedes-Benz C 63 AMG, Lexus IS-F (formerly) and Cadillac ATS-V (now Cadillac CT4-V Blackwing).

== B5 (Typ 8D, 1999–2001) ==
First generation B5 (8D)
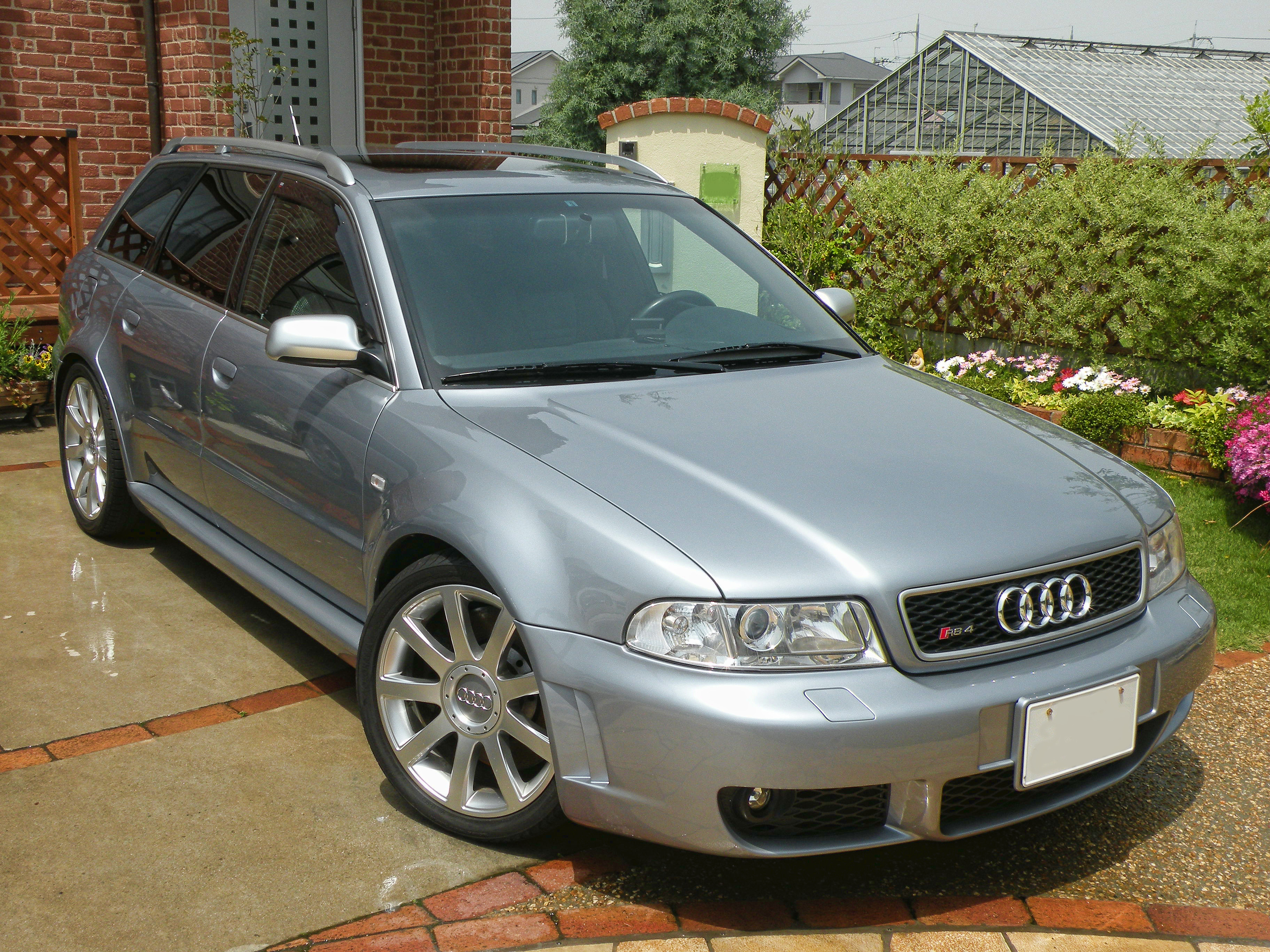
- Audi RS 4 Avant quattro (B5)

Overview
- Production: 1999–2001
- Assembly: Germany: Neckarsulm
- Designer: Erwin Leo Himmel

Body and chassis
- Body style: 5-door Avant (estate/wagon)
- Platform: Volkswagen Group B5
- Related: Audi B5 A4; Audi B5 S4

Powertrain
- Engine: 2.7 V6 biturbo
- Transmission: 6-speed manual

Dimensions
- Wheelbase: 2,607 mm (102.6 in)
- Length: 4,525 mm (178.1 in)
- Width: 1,799 mm (70.8 in)
- Height: 1,386 mm (54.6 in)
- Kerb weight: 1,620 kg (3,571 lb)

Chronology
- Predecessor: Audi RS2 Avant
- Successor: Audi B7 RS 4

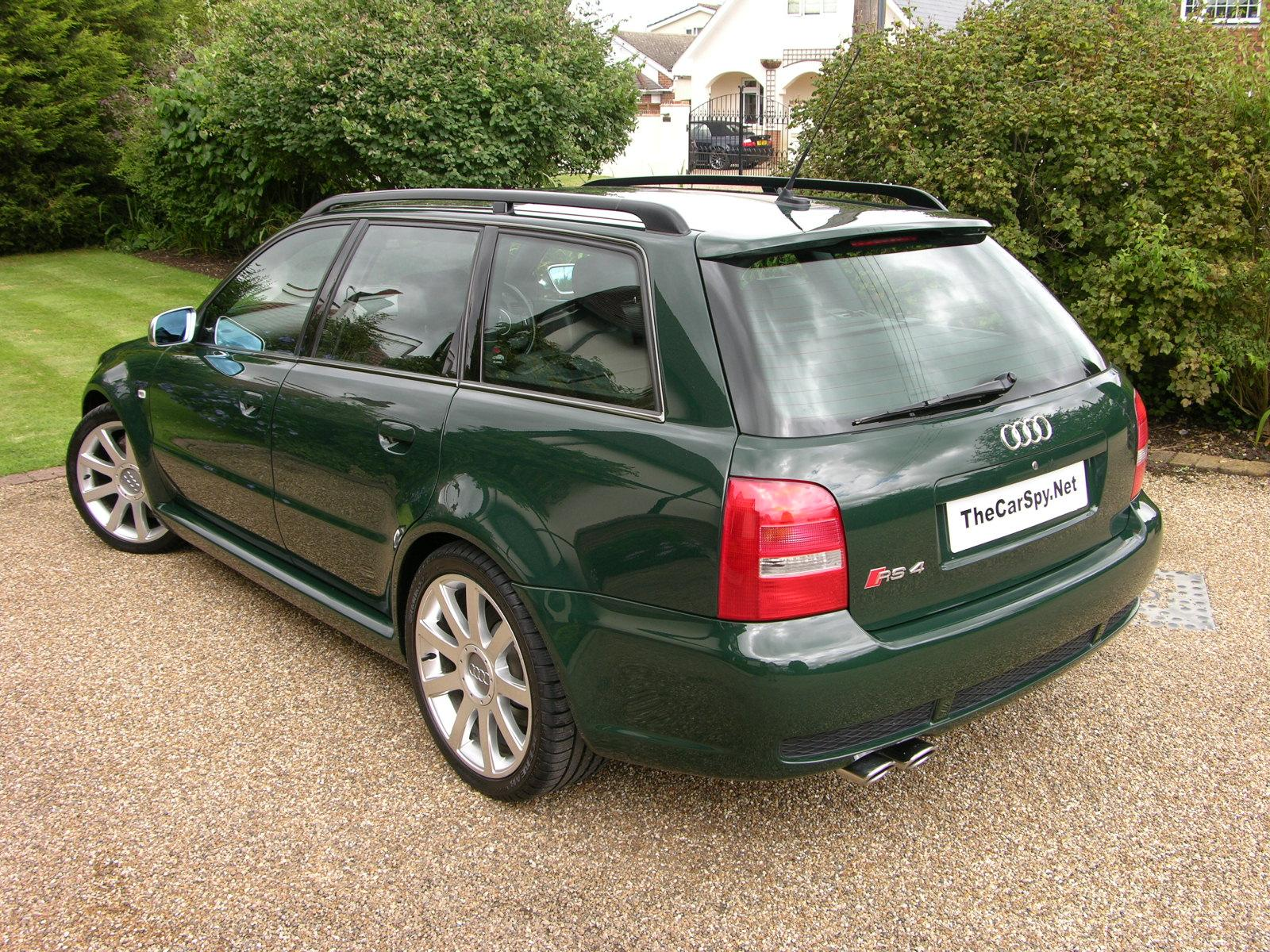
Audi RS 4 Avant (UK) finished in Goodwood Green

The original B5 Audi RS 4 Avant quattro (Typ 8D) was introduced by Audi in late 1999, for main production and sale from 2000, as the successor to the Porsche / Quattro GmbH joint venture-developed Audi RS2 Avant. Like its predecessor, the RS 4 was available only as an Avant and was built on an existing platform, in this case, the Volkswagen Group B5 platform shared with the A4 and S4. Retail price was around DM 103,584. The RS 4 was available for sale in most of Europe, parts of Asia and in some Latin American countries.

Audi produced 6,030 units between 1999 and 2001.

=== B5 bodywork and styling ===
Although related to the B5 S4, many of the outer body panels were altered, with wider front and rear wheel arches to allow for the wider axle track on the RS 4. With unique front and rear bumpers and side sills, and the rear spoiler from the S4 Avant, the aerodynamic modifications achieved a drag coefficient of C_{d} 0.34. Although the B5 S4 came in a saloon car body style, the B5 RS 4 was only available in the Avant version.

Luggage space, measured according to the industry standard VDA method was 390 litres (13.8 cu ft) with the rear seats in the upright position, and 1,250 litres (44.1 cu ft) with the seats folded flat.

=== B5 powertrain ===
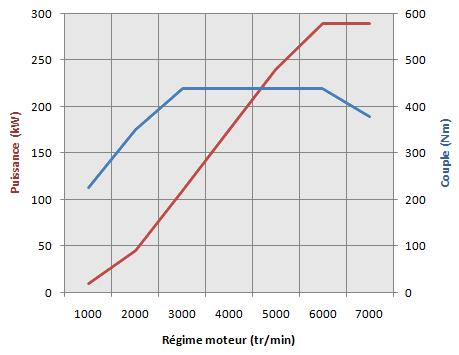
Audi B5 RS 4 engine power (red) and torque (blue) curves

The engine was developed from the 2.7 litre 90° V6 'biturbo' used in the B5 S4. It displaced 2,671 cubic centimetres (163.0 cu in) and had five valves per cylinder. The engine was developed and manufactured in the UK by Cosworth Technology. It featured aluminium alloy ALSi7Mg cylinder heads, cast by Cosworth, with enlarged intake ports and smaller exhaust ports, two parallel BorgWarner K04-series turbochargers, two larger side-mounted intercoolers, dished piston crowns, stronger connecting rods, larger intake ducting, an enlarged exhaust system, and a re-calibrated engine management system. The modifications increased the engine's output from 195 kW (265 PS; 261 bhp) and 400 N⋅m (295 lbf⋅ft) of torque to 280 kW (381 PS; 375 bhp) at 7,000 rpm and 440 N⋅m (325 lbf⋅ft) at 6,000 rpm. The engine was controlled by a Bosch Motronic ME 7.1 electronic engine control unit, using a Bosch 'E-Gas' electronic drive by wire throttle. It had multipoint sequential fuel injection, a mass airflow sensor, and six individual ignition coils. The engine oil was cooled by oil to water and oil to air coolers.

A six-speed manual transmission (parts code prefix: 01E, identification code: FDP) (gear ratios—1st: 3.500, 2nd: 1.889, 3rd: 1.320, 4th: 1.034, 5th: 0.806, 6th: 0.684), cooled by a NACA duct in the engine undertray, and Audi's Torsen-based quattro system, using the Torsen T-1 "automatic torque biasing" center differential, with a 50:50 default bias were standard. Final drive ratio was 4.111.

The RS 4 has a curb weight of 1,620 kg (3,571 lb). It can accelerate from 0-100 km/h (62.1 mph) in 4.9 seconds, 0-160 km/h (99.4 mph) in 11.3 seconds, and 0-200 km/h (124.3 mph) in 17.0 seconds. The top speed is electronically limited to 250 km/h (155 mph).

=== B5 brakes, wheels and tyres ===
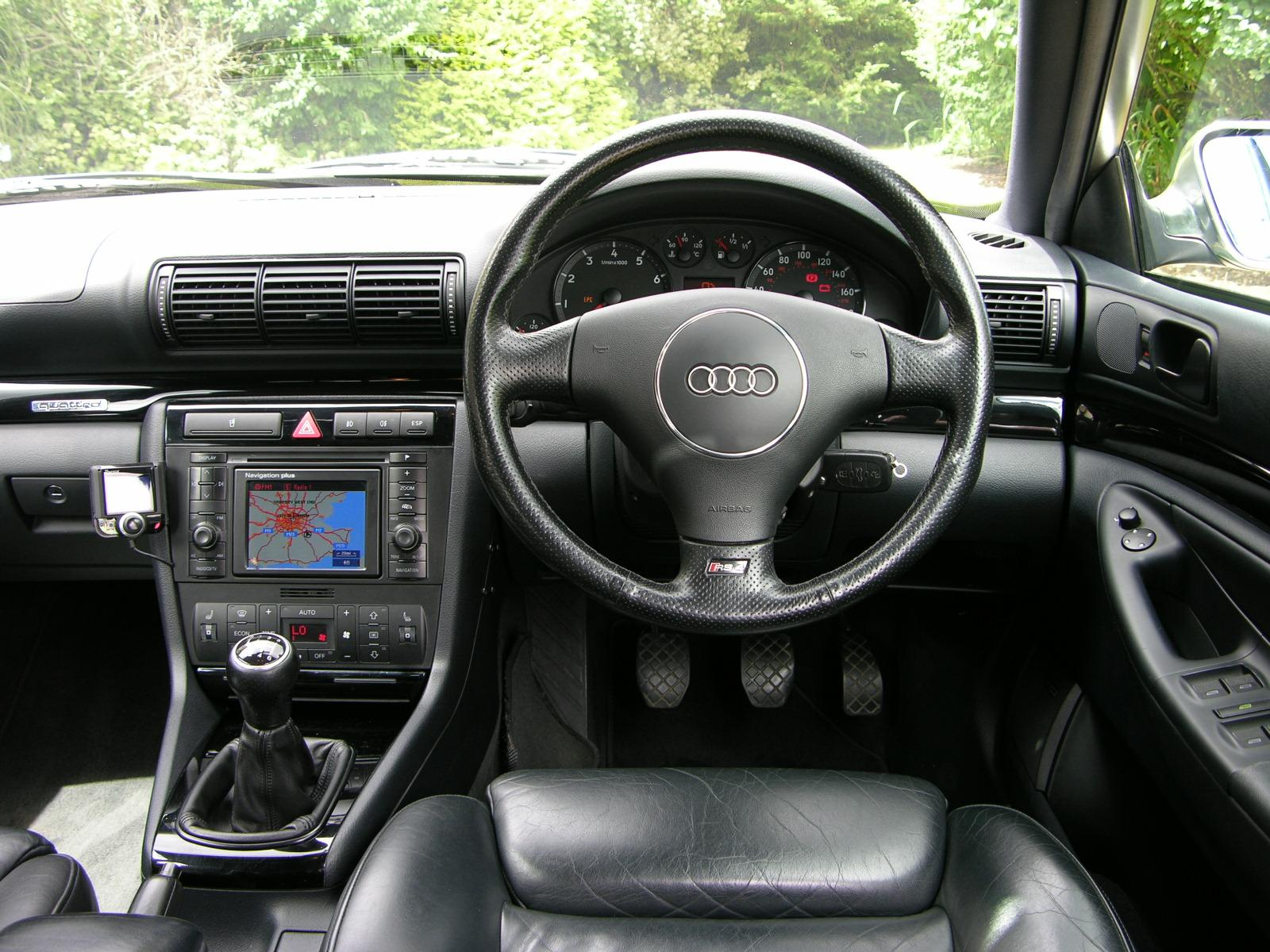
Interior

Brakes were also developed jointly in house by Audi's quattro GmbH, not by Porsche as with its predecessor, the RS2. At the front they were radially vented and floating cast iron discs, 360 mm (14.2 in) diameter and 32 mm (1.26 in) thick, with double-piston floating calipers, and at the rear 312 mm (12.3 in) by 22 mm (0.87 in) discs with a single-piston floating caliper. The RS 4 needed less than 50 metres (160 ft) to come to a full stop from a speed of 110 km/h (68 mph).

The standard wheels were 18 inch alloy wheels (8½×18" "9-spoke"), with 255/35 ZR18 high performance tyres. Optional "winter" alloy wheels were also available, at 18 inch (7½J×18"), with 225/40 R18 92V tyres.

=== Other B5 notable features ===
- "Sideguard", Audi's curtain airbag system.
- Xenon High-Intensity Discharge (HID) headlamps.

== B7 (Typ 8E, 2006–2008) ==
Second generation B7 (8E)
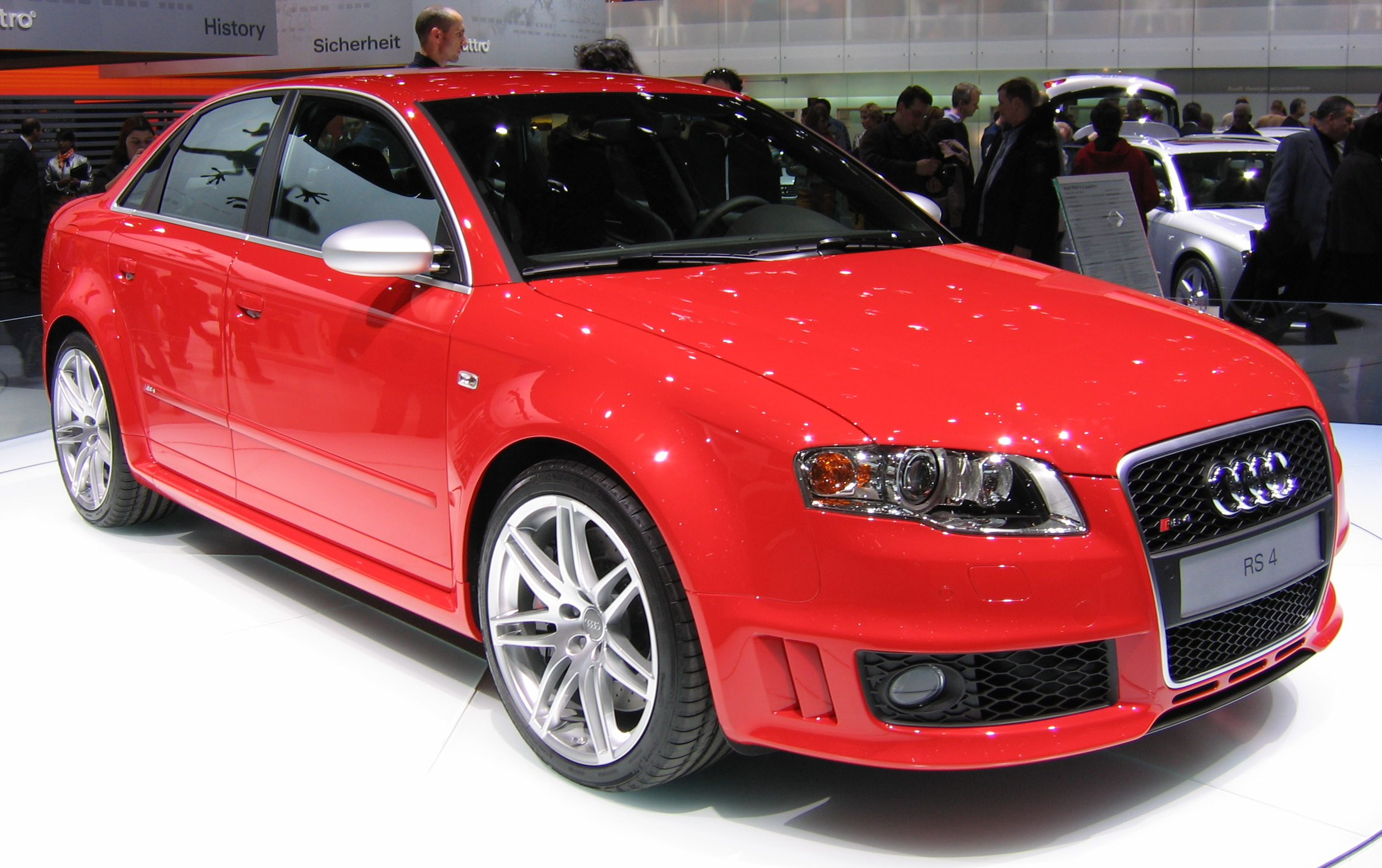
- Audi RS 4 sedan (B7)

Overview
- Production: 2006–2008
- Assembly: Germany: Neckarsulm (Sedan & Avant); Germany: Rheine (Karmann: Cabriolet)

Body and chassis
- Body style: 4-door saloon/sedan, 5-door Avant (estate/wagon), 2-door Cabriolet
- Platform: Volkswagen Group B7
- Related: Audi B7 A4; Audi B7 S4; SEAT Exeo

Powertrain
- Engine: 4.2 V8 FSI
- Transmission: 6-speed Getrag manual

Dimensions
- Wheelbase: 2,648 mm (104.3 in), Cabrio: 2,650 mm (104.3 in)
- Length: 4,589 mm (180.7 in), Cabrio: 4,555 mm (179.3 in)
- Width: 1,816 mm (71.5 in), Cabrio: 1,814 mm (71.4 in)
- Height: 1,415 mm (55.7 in), Cabrio: 1,391 mm (54.8 in)
- Kerb weight: saloon: 1,650–1,680 kg (3,638–3,704 lb), Avant: 1,710 kg (3,770 lb), Cabrio: 1,845 kg (4,068 lb)

Chronology
- Predecessor: Audi B5 RS 4
- Successor: Audi B8 RS 4 Audi RS5 (for RS 4 Cabriolet)

There was no RS 4 built on the Audi "B6" platform, which served as the basis for the Audi A4 between 2001 and 2005. However, the second Audi RS 4 quattro (Typ 8E) was built on Audi's "B7" platform, by quattro GmbH in Neckarsulm, Germany. It was unveiled in February 2005 at Audi's 'quattro Night' celebration at the company headquarters in Ingolstadt, Germany.

The RS 4 became available to European customers in mid-2006. It was introduced at the 2006 North American International Auto Show in January, and arrived in June 2006 in North America. The production run of the B7 RS 4 was 2006 to 2008 inclusive, although only 2007 and 2008 model year were sold in the United States. Approximately 10,000 B7 RS 4s were built, of which around 2,000 are in the USA.

The B7 RS 4 Cabriolet was sold in Europe from late 2006 to 2008. It was also available in the US in limited numbers per year and sold at a premium of $2000 over the list.

Audi factory numbers indicate that the B7 RS 4 saloon can accelerate from 0 to 100 km/h (0 to 62 mph) in 4.8 seconds, and arrive at 0 to 200 km/h (0 to 124 mph) in 16.6 seconds. Most European magazines recorded results in line with the November 2009 comparison of "ultimate sedans" in Road & Track, which recorded a 0 to 60 mph (97 km/h) time of 4.5 seconds. For the Avant, 0 to 100 km/h (0 to 62 mph) is reached in 4.9 seconds. Top speed for all variants is "officially" electronically limited to 250 km/h (155.3 mph).

=== B7 bodywork and styling ===
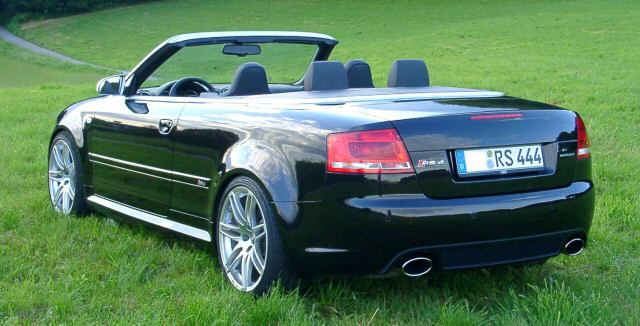
Audi RS 4 Cabriolet quattro

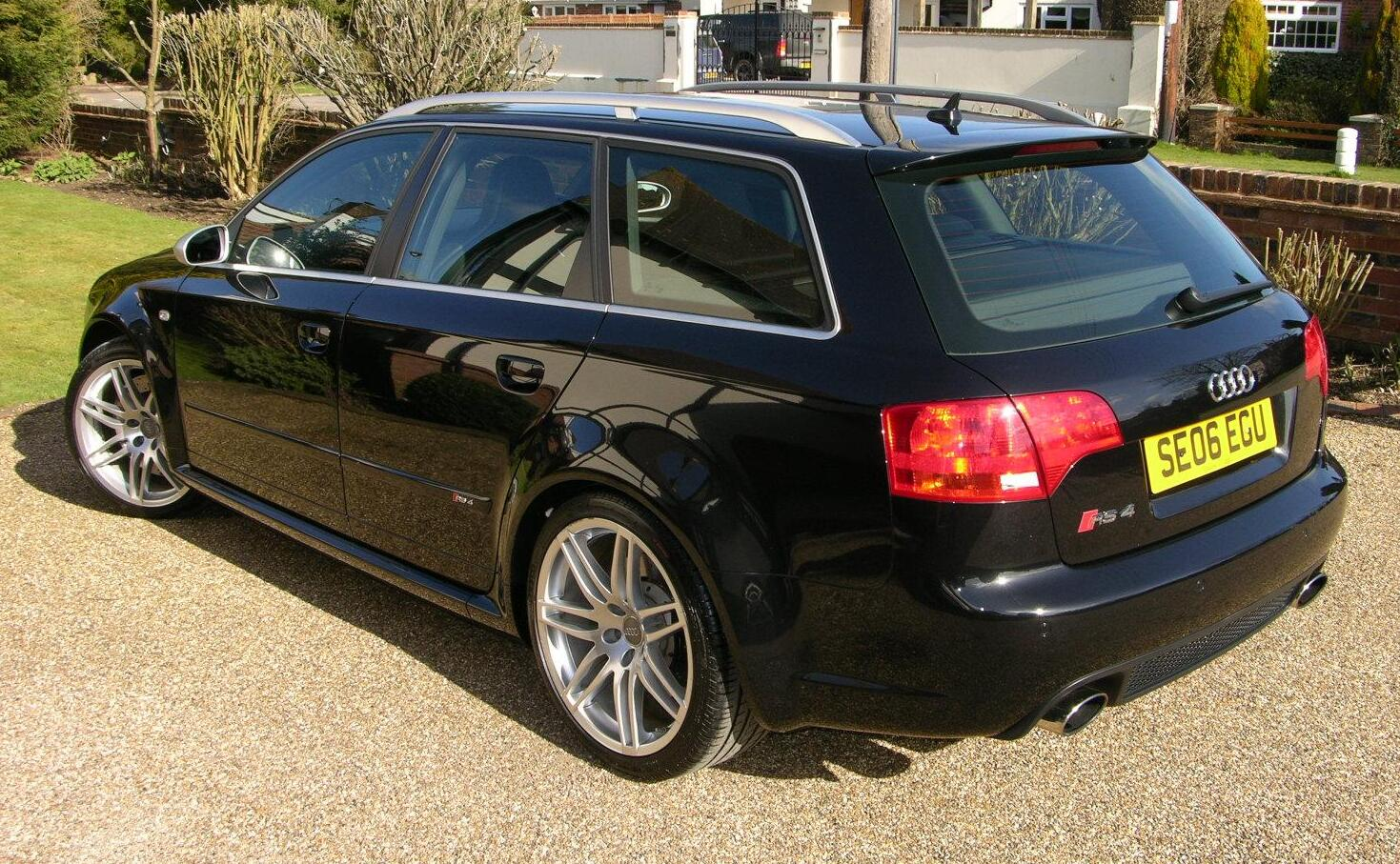
Audi RS 4 Avant

The B7 RS 4 is an almost complete departure from previous Audi "RS" cars, as it was initially available as a four-door five-seat saloon/sedan; with a five-door five-seat Avant, and two-door four-seat Cabriolet versions arriving later. Only the Audi RS 6 had taken this similar route (saloon and Avant) before, unlike the previous RS 4 and RS2, which were available exclusively as Avants.

Constructed from fully galvanised steel unibody, the B7 RS 4 uses aluminium for its front wings (fenders) and bonnet (hood). The saloon version features a drag coefficient (C_{d}) of 0.31, from a frontal area of 2.17 m^{2}.

The B7 RS 4 differs visually from the standard B7 S4, by having even wider flared front and rear wheel arches (fenders), to allow for a wider axle track. Over the B7 A4, it also includes two larger frontal side air intakes (for the two additional side-mounted coolant radiators). The B7 RS 4 also includes optional adaptive headlights, which swivel around corners in conjunction with steering wheel movements. An acoustic parking system with front and rear sensors is also a standard fitment. Unique carbon fiber interior trims, along with a lap timer within the central Driver Information System, aluminium pedal caps and footrest, and RS 4 logos complete the look.

In the saloon, luggage space, measured according to the VDA 'block method', is 460 litres (16.2 cu ft) with the rear seats in the upright position, and 720 to 833 litres (25.4 to 29.4 cu ft) with the seats folded flat (dependent on specification). For the Avant, 442 litres (15.6 cu ft) is available with the seats upright (under the retractable load cover), and 1,354 litres (47.8 cu ft) being available with the rear seats folded flat (loaded to the roofline). Kerb weight of the saloon variant starts at 1,650 kg (3,638 lb).

A Bose ten-speaker sound system, with 190 watt output and automatic dynamic noise compensation, with "Concert II" radio and single CD player is standard equipment. Additional options include the "Symphony II" system which features twin radio tuners, a single-slot loading six-CD changer, and a cassette player all integrated into a double-DIN sized unit. The RNS-E "Audi Navigation System plus" DVD-ROM GPS was also available.

==== B7 interior safety ====
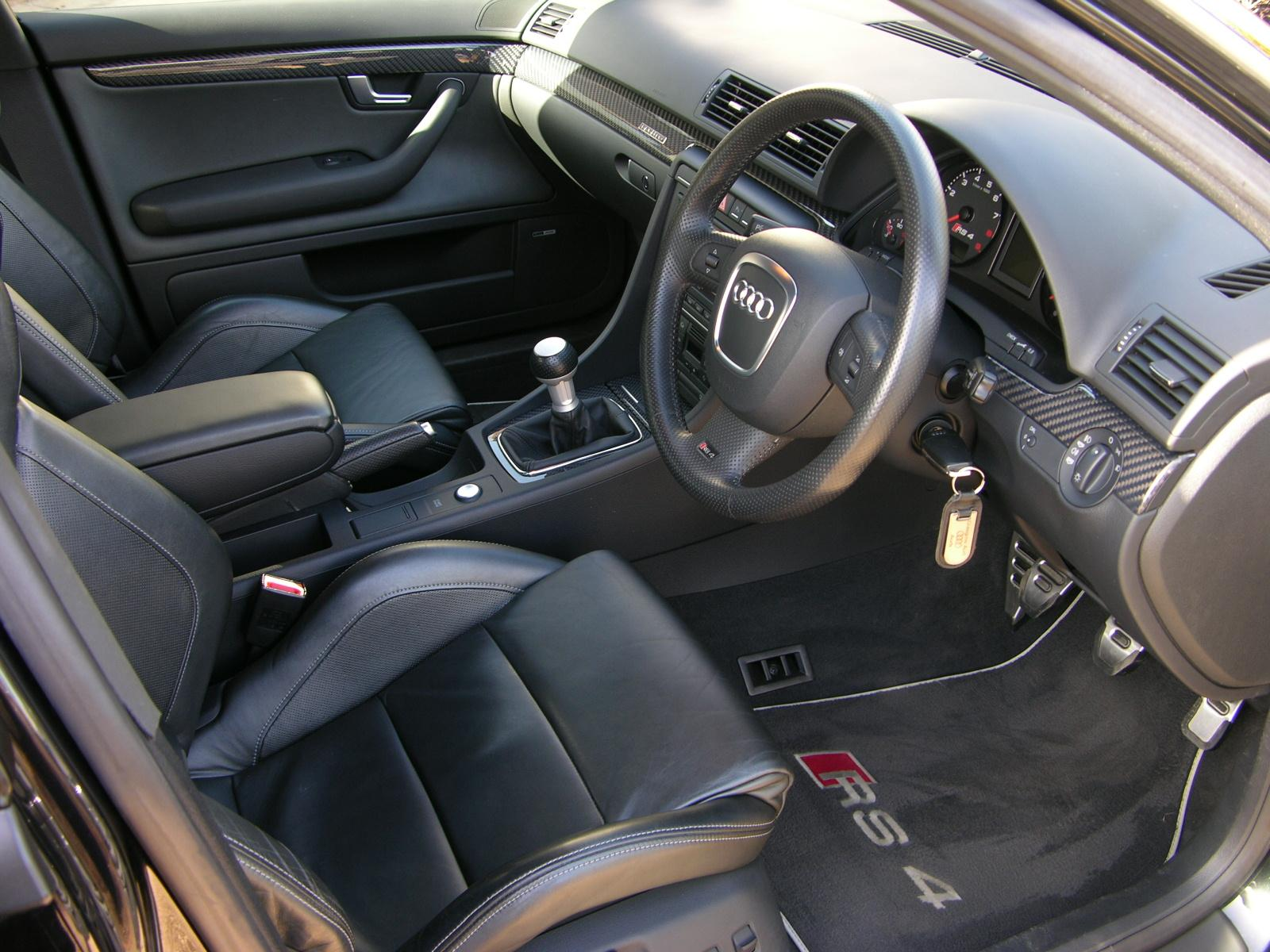
Interior

To achieve maximum body stiffness with controlled deformation crumple zones, the B7 RS 4 features laser beam welding of major seams of the high-strength steel body shell, which helps improve overall structural rigidity, particularly in the "passenger cell", over traditional spot welding methods.

Two-stage driver and front-seat passenger frontal airbags are standard, as is Audi's "side guard" head protection curtain airbag system. This latter system completely covers all of the side windows, from the front "A" pillar to the rear "C-" or "D pillars". The Recaro shell-type RS race bucket seats (not available in North American markets) include electrically inflatable upper and lower side bolsters and adjustable lumbar support. In North America, the only front seats available are the more traditional Recaro seats (identical to those in the B6 and B7 S4), which include lower side airbags. Lower side airbags are optional for the standard-fit Recaro rear seats. Front and outer rear seatbelts include pyrotechnic belt pretensioners.

=== B7 powertrain ===
The 4.2 L (4,163 cc) 32v V8 engine of the B7 RS 4 is based on the previous 4.2 L (4,163 cc) all-alloy 40v V8 from the B6 S4, and shares many parts, and Fuel Stratified Injection, with the 4.2 FSI V8 engine in the Q7. The engine includes new cylinder block construction, and is a highly reworked, high-revving variant (redline at 8,000 rpm; rev limit of 8,250 rpm).

The same engine base was used for the Audi R8 when Audi chose to build their first supercar. However, the camshaft drive system was moved to the front of the block for the mid-engine R8.

The engine has increased crankcase breathing, a low-pressure fuel return system and a baffled oil sump, to prevent engine lubricant cavitation at high engine speeds and high-G cornering. It has four valves per cylinder (instead of five on the earlier variant) and two overhead camshafts on each cylinder bank (making it "quad cam"), which are driven by roller chains with variable valve timing for both inlet and exhaust camshafts, along with a cast magnesium alloy fixed tract length intake manifold with adjustable tumble flaps (to improve low engine speed combustion). On 98 RON (93 AKI) Super-Unleaded petrol it produces 309 kW (420 PS; 414 bhp) at 7,800 rpm, giving it a specific power output of 74.2 kW (100.9 PS; 99.5 bhp) per litre. Based on a kerb weight of 1,680 kg (3,704 lb), this results in a power-to-weight ratio of 0.184 kW per kg. Exhaust gas escapes through two '4-into-2-into-1' fan-branch steel exhaust manifolds and four high-flow catalytic converters, into twin oval tail pipes with dynamic silencer/muffler valves. The engine is controlled by two Bosch DI-Motronic electronic engine control units (working as 'master' and 'slave', because of the high-revving nature of the engine). The ignition system uses eight individual single-spark coils using mapped direct ignition. The saloon version produces 322-329 grams of CO_{2} per kilometre (g/km), and the Avant starts from 324 g/km.

A 6-speed Getrag manual transmission is the only transmission available. The gear ratios are 1st: 3.667, 2nd: 2.211, 3rd: 1.520, 4th: 1.133, 5th: 0.919, 6th: 0.778.

The Audi B7 RS 4 was the only "RS" Audi powered by a naturally aspirated engine until the Audi RS5 was presented at the 2010 Geneva Motor Show.

=== Quattro ===
Another focus of the B7 RS 4 was on the introduction of the latest development of Audi's quattro permanent four-wheel drive system. This utilized the 'third generation' asymmetric/dynamic Torsen 'automatic torque biasing' centre differential, featuring a 'default' 40:60 front-to-rear torque split under normal conditions. Audi stressed that this would result in a more neutral response in corners and a more dynamic driving experience. Also, a more aggressive Torque Bias Ratio (TBR) was used, and set to 4:1, as opposed to 2:1 (and later variants 3:1 TBR) on standard A4. That means that one side of the differential can handle up to 80%, while the other side would have to only handle 20% of applied torque.

Front and rear axle differentials are conventional "open" types, with a final drive ratio of 4.111.

Traction is assisted by way of "Electronic Differential Lock" (EDL), which monitors the rotational speeds of the left and right wheels across an individual axle, and if one wheel should rotate faster than the other (exceeding the pre-defined parameters), indicating loss of traction, or "wheel spin" on one wheel, the EDL applies the brakes to that individual spinning wheel, and thus results in transferring torque across the open differential to the wheel on the other side deemed to have grip, hence traction.

=== B7 suspension and steering ===
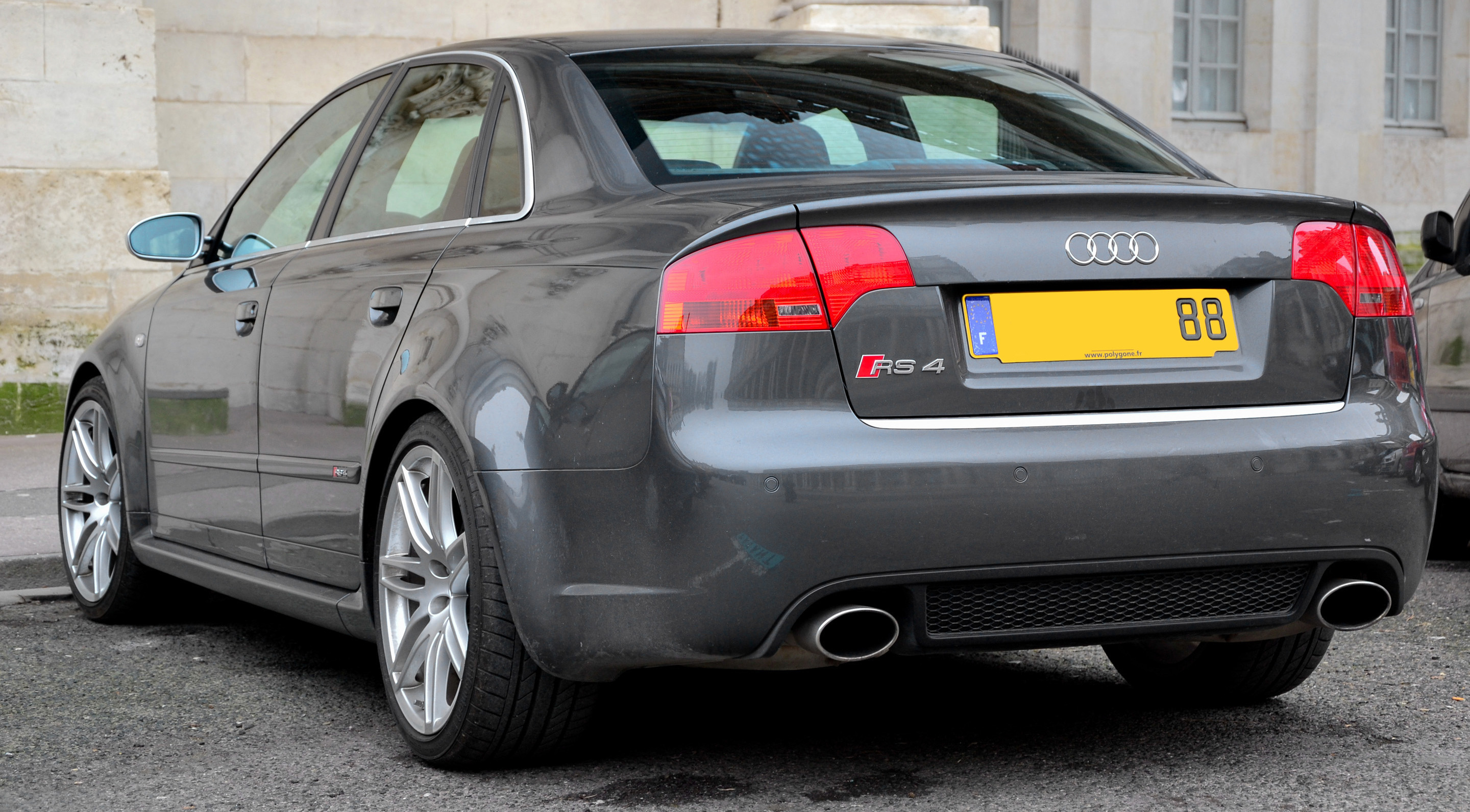
Audi B7 RS 4

The B7 RS 4 also incorporates Audi's "Dynamic Ride Control" "Sports Suspension" mechanism. The dampers/shock absorbers are made for Audi by KW, and central reservoirs/valves made by KYB.

In the RS 4 suspension, a fluid hydraulic linkage between diagonally opposing front and rear suspension dampers (left front to right rear, and vice versa) is used to counteract vehicle pitch and roll. Lightweight magnesium/aluminium alloy multi-link suspension arms (four arm with virtual steering axis up front, and trapezoidal arm with unequal length track control arms at the rear) locate each wheel in a controllable fashion, whilst minimising unsprung masses. Hollow tubular anti-roll bars are standard front and rear. Compared to standard [B7 A] models, the RS 4 features a 30 mm (1.2 in) lower ride height. An optional "Sports Suspension Plus" lowers the car by a further 10 mm (0.4 in), and marginally further stiffens the damper rates.

Axle track has also been increased over standard A4s; the front widened by 37 mm (1.5 in), to 1,559 mm (61.4 in) and the rear by 47 mm (1.9 in) to 1,569 mm (61.8 in).

=== B7 brakes, wheels and tyres ===
The standard brakes on the RS 4 are of two-piece construction. The cast-iron discs are cross-drilled and radially ventilated and float on aluminium alloy disc hubs. The two-piece disc construction reduces unsprung mass and also reduces the transmission of heat generated by the brakes to the wheel bearings. The front discs are 365 mm (14.4 in) in diameter and 34 mm (1.34 in) thick with Brembo monoblock eight-piston fixed calipers.

The rear brakes are drilled, vented and floating 324 mm (12.8 in) by 22 mm (0.87 in) iron discs with single piston floating calipers and an integrated mechanical handbrake mechanism.

A lighter and more performant "Audi ceramic" front brake system was an option from 2007 model year onwards (and only with 19 inch wheels). It comprised cross-drilled, radially vented and floating Carbon fibre-reinforced Silicon Carbide composite SGL Carbon discs, 380 mm (15.0 in) diameter and 38 mm (1.50 in) thick, with grey Brembo monoblock six-piston fixed aluminium calipers.

In the UK and Japan, the standard wheels are 19 inch alloy wheels (9Jx19" ET29 "7-arm double spoke") with 255/35 ZR19 96Y XL tyres. This 19" wheel and tyre package was an option for the North American, and some European markets.

=== B7 crash testing ===
The North American Insurance Institute for Highway Safety (IIHS) crash-tested the B7 RS 4's sibling, the B7 A4, and awarded it "Double Best Pick" for frontal and side crashes—beating rivals such as the BMW 3 Series, the Mercedes-Benz C-Class, however at the 2012 session of the SOT (small overlap test) the A4 was rated Poor, rating applying up to the 2016 MY. ()

=== B7 awards ===
The Audi RS 4 won Top Gear's Most Surprising Car of the Year in 2005. In 2007, the Audi RS 4 was the winner in the "World Performance Car" category of the International World Car of the Year (WCOTY).

== B8 (Typ 8K, 2012–2015) ==
Third generation B8 (8K)
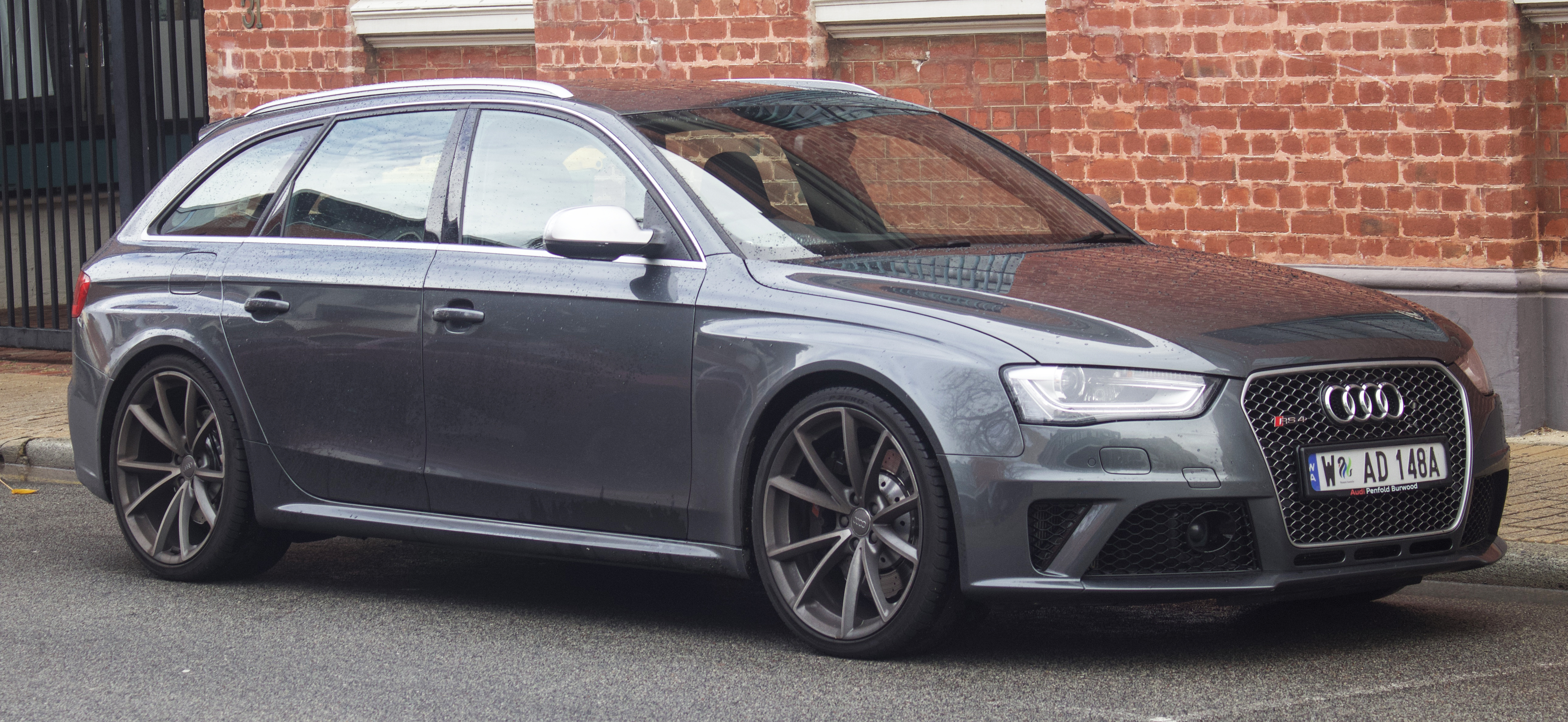
- Audi RS 4 Avant (B8)

Overview
- Production: 2012–2015
- Assembly: Germany: Ingolstadt

Body and chassis
- Body style: 5-door estate/wagon
- Platform: Volkswagen Group MLB platform
- Related: Audi B8 A4; Audi B8 S4; Audi A5; Audi S5; Audi Q5

Powertrain
- Engine: 4.2 L naturally-aspirated V8 FSI
- Transmission: 7-speed dual-clutch S-tronic

Dimensions
- Wheelbase: 2,811 mm (110.7 in)
- Length: 4,719 mm (185.8 in)
- Width: 1,826 mm (71.9 in)
- Height: 1,415 mm (55.7 in)
- Kerb weight: 1,795 kg (3,957 lb)

Chronology
- Predecessor: Audi B7 RS 4
- Successor: Audi B9 RS 4

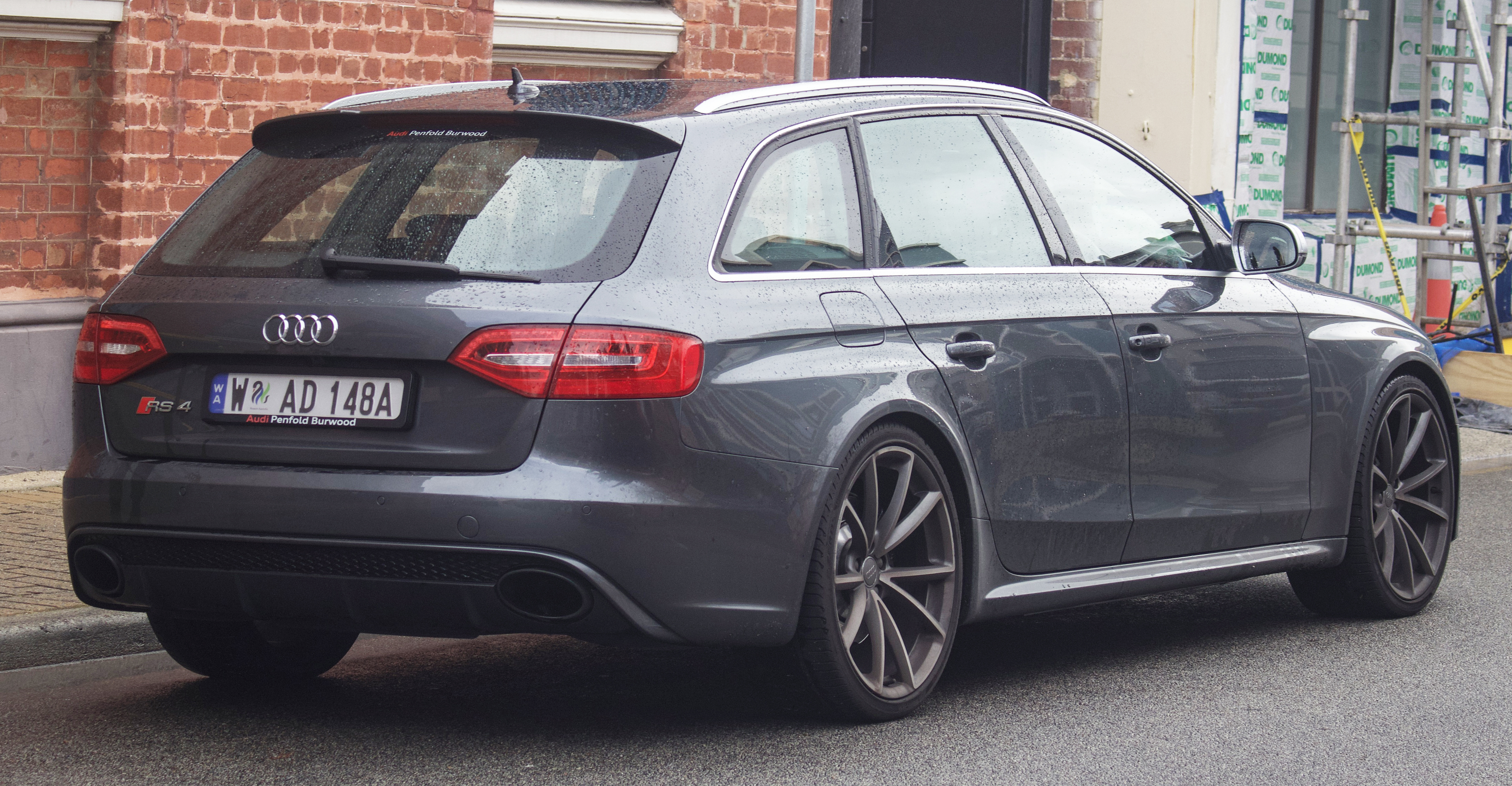
Rear view

The Audi RS 4 Avant quattro was unveiled at the 2012 Geneva Motor Show and was based on the B8 A4 Avant. The RS 4 Avant uses the Volkswagen MLB platform, and shares the same powertrain as the RS 5 Coupé.

=== B8 bodywork and styling ===
Compared to the related B8 S4, the RS 4 features larger bumper air dams and features double exhaust tailpipes compared to the S4's double twin (quadruple) exhaust tailpipes. Wider arches allow for a wider axle and wheels. It also features a completely remodelled front bumper cover with honeycomb grille compared to the standard A4 and S4, as well as a remodelled rear bumper with honeycomb detailing and minor air diffuser. This generation also reverts to only being offered as an Avant.

The interior is largely the same but the flat-bottom steering wheel is covered entirely in perforated leather with RS badging on the steering wheel and gear stick. The interior dashboard and door liners are also detailed with carbon fibre inserts as standard although there were options to change this to aluminium or piano black.

SuperSport seats covered partly with leather part Alcantara were standard in the B8 RS 4 but as with the B7, there was a winged backed bucket seat option. It was also an option to order the seats covered entirely with leather.

=== B8 powertrain ===
The RS 4 is powered by a 4.2L FSI V8 engine producing 450 PS (331 kW; 444 hp) and 430 N⋅m (317 lbf⋅ft), allowing the car to accelerate from 0–60 mph (0–97 km/h) in 4.2 seconds. The RS 4 Avant is available with a 7-speed dual-clutch S-Tronic transmission.

=== B8 brakes, wheels and tires ===
New for the B8 are 'wavy' vented and floating cast iron discs, 365 mm (14.4 in) diameter and 345 mm (13.58 in) thick, with 6-piston Brembo floating calipers, and at the rear 330 mm (13.0 in) by 22 mm (0.87 in) discs with a single-piston floating caliper.

The standard wheels were 19 inch with 235/40 R19 Pirelli P-Zero tyres. Optional 20" rotor design or 10 spoke alloy wheels were also available with 265/30ZR20 Pirelli P-Zero tyres.

=== Other B8 notable features ===
Amongst the options available for the B8 RS 4, are ceramic brakes, allowing the car to perform heavy braking without having brake fade.

A sports pack was available which included a Sports exhaust identifiable by black exhaust tips in the rear bumper, and Dynamic Ride Control suspension. The Sports pack also came with the 20" rotor design wheels as standard.

A total of 7000 units of the Audi B8 RS 4 were built.

=== RS4 Nogaro Selection Limited Edition ===
In February 2014, Audi announced a tribute to the original RS 2 Avant on its 20th anniversary by releasing a limited run of the Nogaro Selection Limited Edition. The changes were entirely cosmetic, with black trim and roof rails, red brake calipers, and blue Alcantara detailed interior (seats, door lining, blue carbon weave elements & blue stitching), as well as the limited edition Nogaro Blue exterior paint. It retailed at approximately 10% more than the standard model.

Some ~200 were manufactured, with approximately 39 in RHD being registered in the UK.

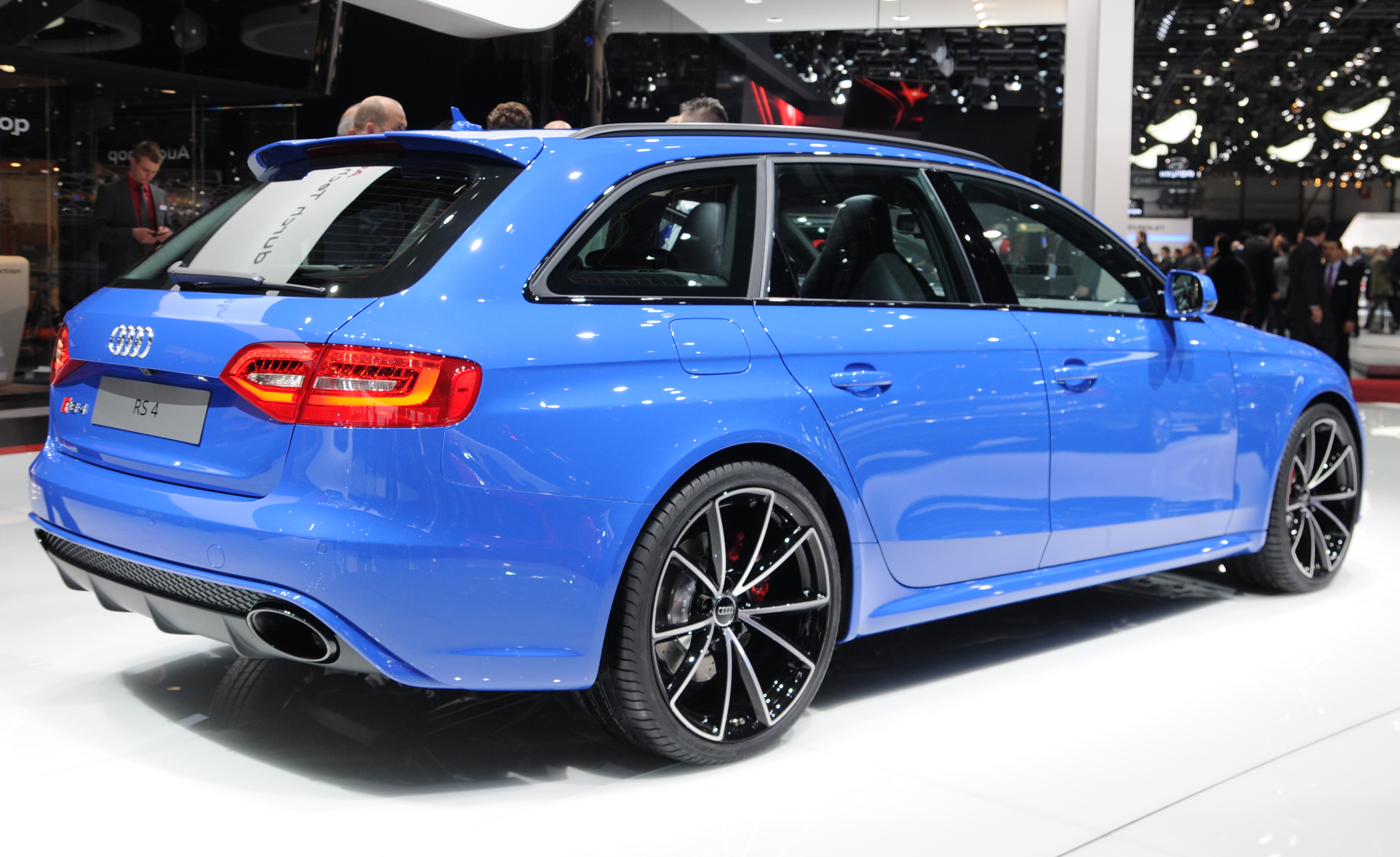
Audi RS 4 Nogaro Selection Limited Edition (B8) at the 2014 Geneva Motor Show.

== B9 (Typ 8W, 2018–2026) ==
Fourth generation B9 (8W)
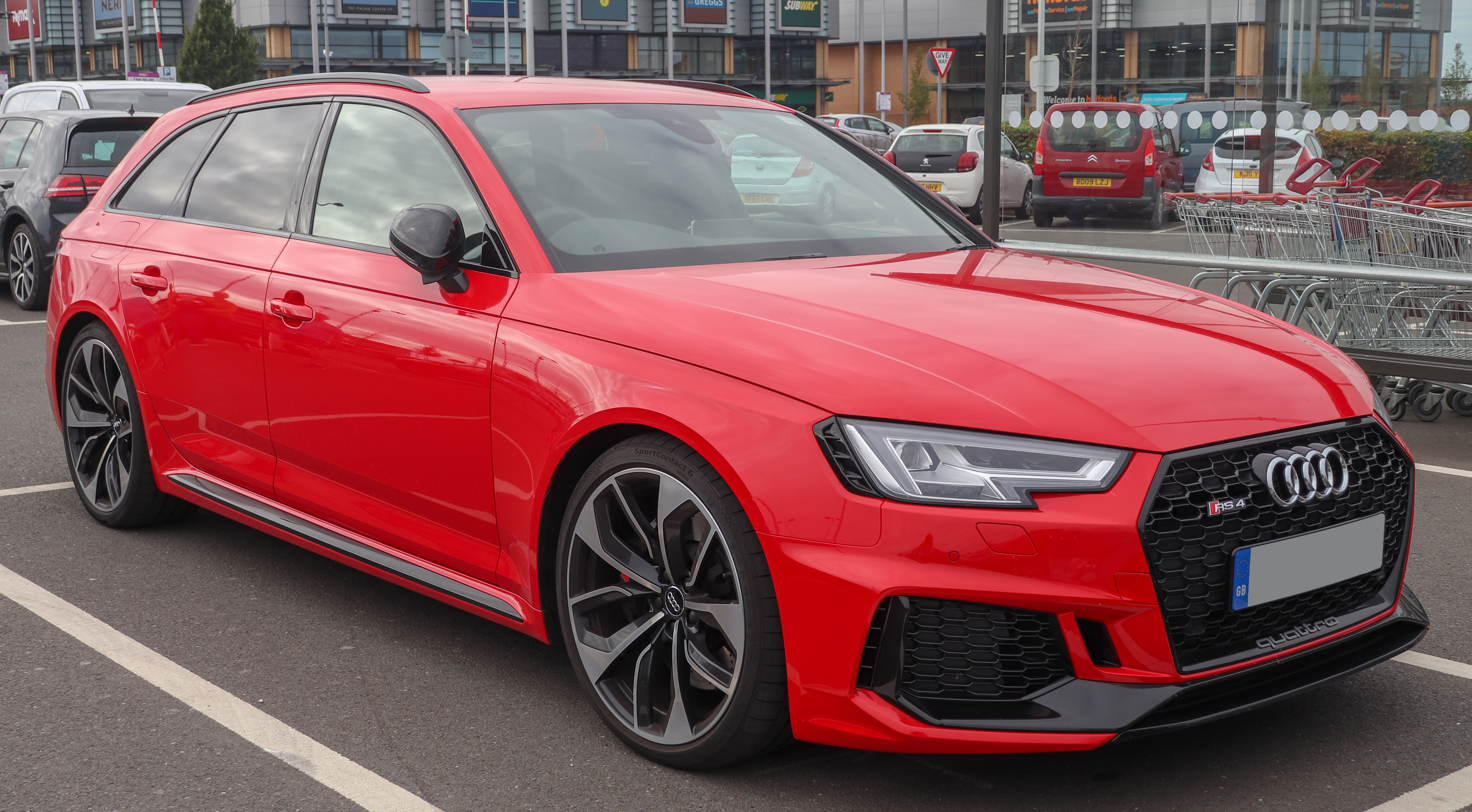
- 2018 Audi RS 4 Avant

Overview
- Production: 2018–2025
- Assembly: Germany: Ingolstadt

Body and chassis
- Body style: 5-door estate/wagon
- Platform: Volkswagen Group MLB platform
- Related: Audi B9 A4; Audi B9 S4

Powertrain
- Engine: 2.9 V6 TFSI
- Transmission: 8-speed ZF 8HP tiptronic automatic

Dimensions
- Wheelbase: 2,826 mm (111.3 in)
- Length: 4,781 mm (188.2 in)
- Width: 1,866 mm (73.5 in)
- Height: 1,404 mm (55.3 in)
- Curb weight: 1,790 kg (3,950 lb)

Chronology
- Predecessor: Audi B8 RS 4 Avant
- Successor: Audi RS5 (B10)

The B9 RS 4 Avant was unveiled at the 2017 Frankfurt Motor Show. Noticeable changes include a more angular exterior and newly designed wheels. The B9 RS 4 Avant is powered by a 2.9 TFSI V6 twin-turbo engine producing 450 PS (331 kW; 444 bhp) and 600 N⋅m (443 lbf⋅ft) of torque. This means that the RS4 B9 produces the same power as the previous model (B8) while making more torque (extra 170 Nm) from a smaller displacement engine, resulting in better fuel efficiency and acceleration.

This 2.9TT V6, (known as the EA839; the DECA variant), is also shared with the Porsche Panamera lineup. The highest trim available of Panamera with this engine is the Panamera 4S.

Unlike the B8 RS 4, which had a 7-speed dual-clutch S-Tronic transmission, the new RS 4 Avant is available with an 8-speed 'Tiptronic' automatic transmission.

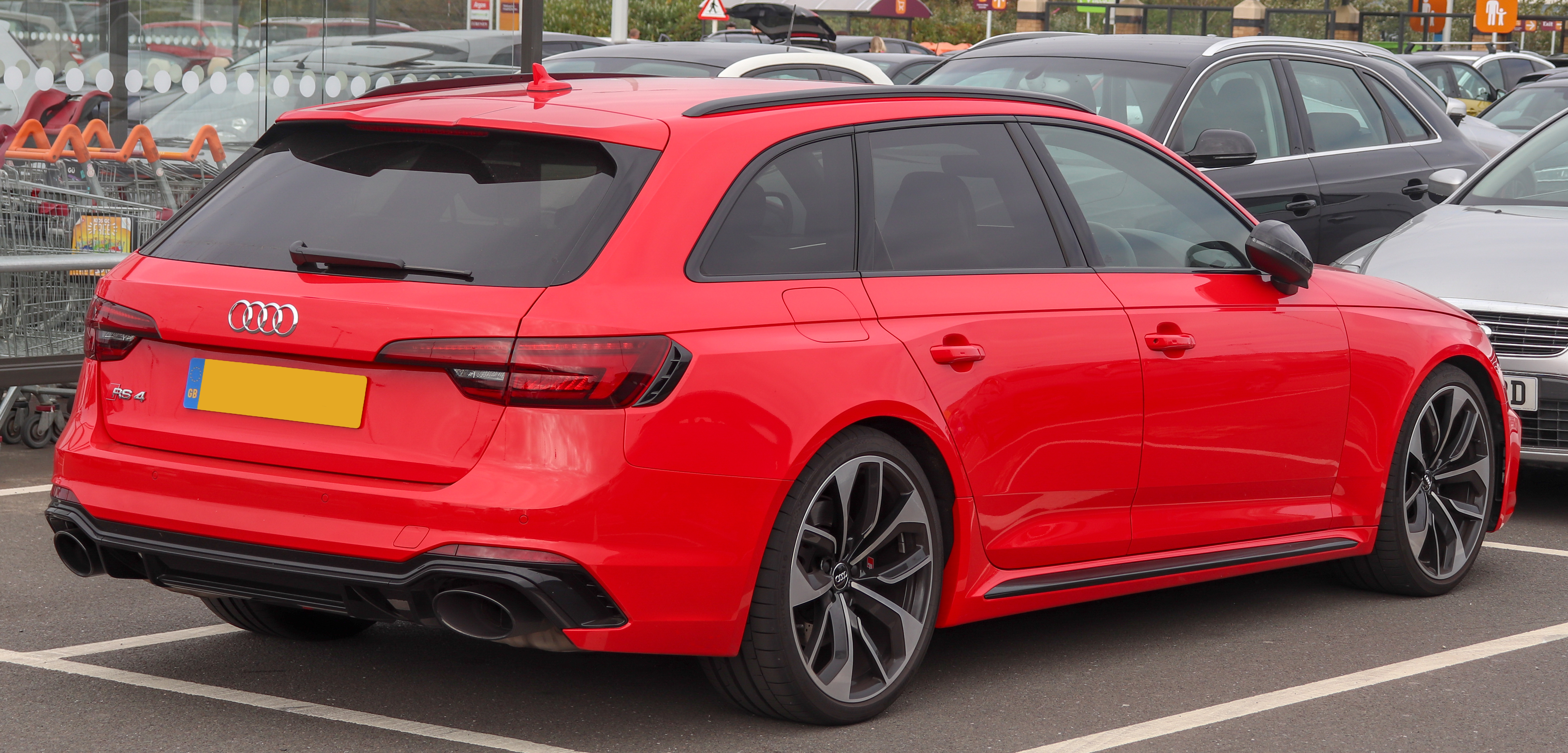
Rear

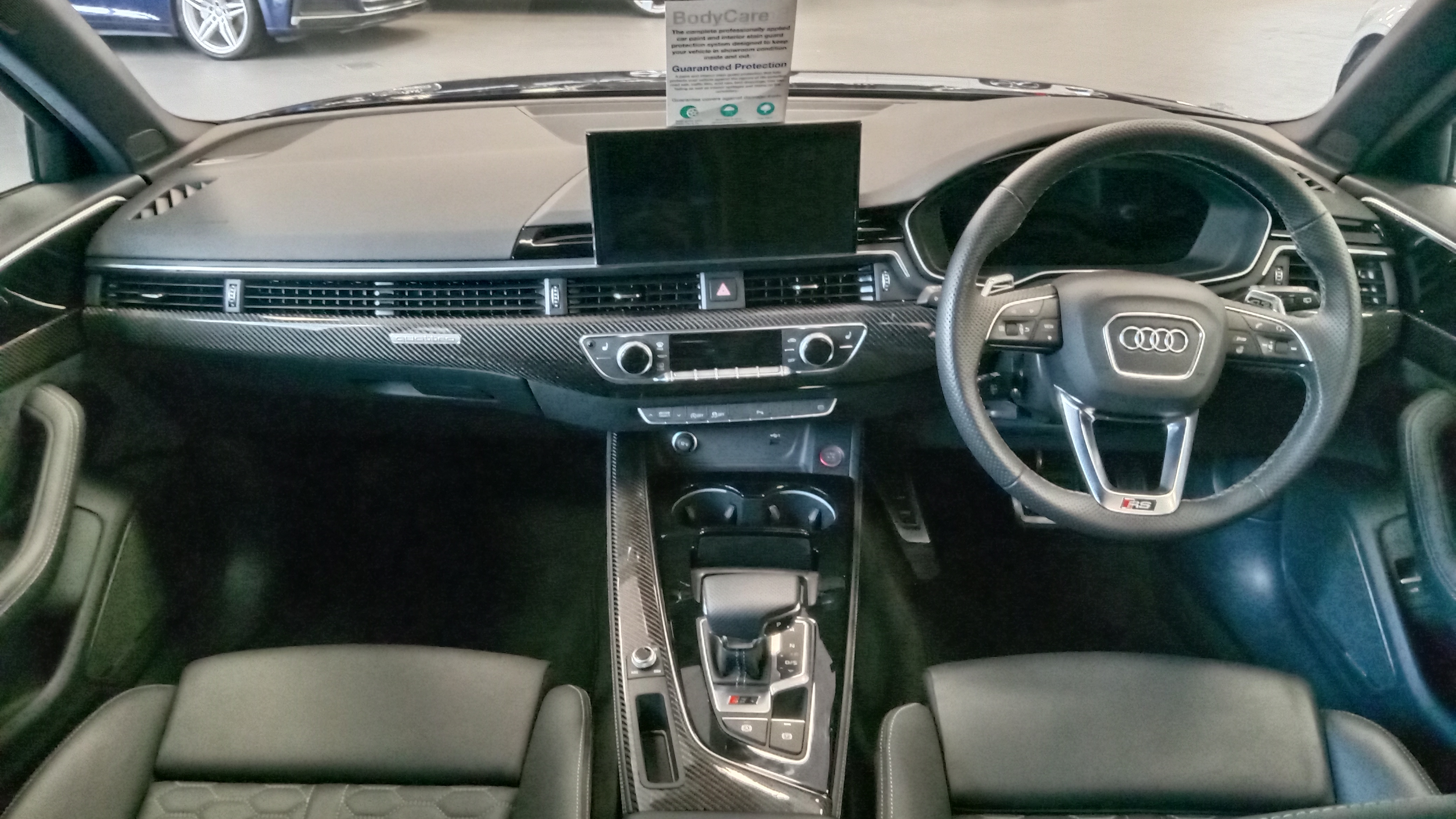
Interior

== Motorsport ==
=== Speed World Challenge ===
The B7 RS 4 was planned to replace the C5 RS6 in the Sports Car Club of America (SCCA) Speed World Challenge, but after Champion Racing had prepared the car, it was decided not to compete in the series, due to rule changes imposed by the SCCA on Audi concerning 4WD systems, wheel size, and engine power output. Rather than scrapping the fully built Speed World Challenge RS 4, Champion Racing and Audi used the car as a part of the American Le Mans Series Vitesse Program, which highlights the technology link between race cars and conventional series production road cars.

=== Euro Superstars ===
Six RS 4s are openly campaigned in the Superstars Series by Audi Sport Italia. Audi RS 4 Quattro driver Gianni Morbidelli won the 2007 and 2008 championships.

== See also ==
- Audi S and RS models
- Audi A4 (includes information on the factory-developed V8-powered A4 DTM race cars)
- Audi S4
- Audi S6
- Audi RS 6
