= 4motion =

All-wheel-drivetrain developed by Volkswagen

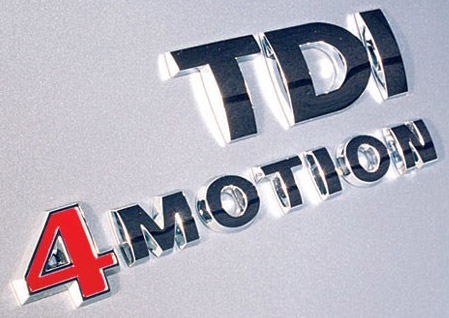
"4 Motion" logo badge on the rear of a VW car

4motion is a registered trademark of Volkswagen AG, used exclusively on Volkswagen-branded automobiles with four-wheel drive (4WD) systems. Volkswagen has previously used the term "Syncro" for its 4WD models, such as in Volkswagen T3.

Of the Volkswagen Group's other marques, the "quattro" nomenclature is used for 4WD Audi cars. Sister companies Škoda simply uses the nomenclature "4x4" after the model name, whereas Porsche merely uses "4".

None of the above trademarks is specific to any particular 4WD system or technology being employed. Generally, Volkswagen would use Haldex Traction clutch system on their "4motion" transverse engined cars. For longitudinal engined cars, they would use a Torsen limited-slip differential-based 4WD system or lockable centre differential instead.

== See also ==
- quattro - Audi
- 4Matic - Mercedes-Benz
- xDrive - BMW
- All-Trac - Toyota
- ATTESA - Nissan
- S-AWC - Mitsubishi Motors
- Symmetrical All Wheel Drive - Subaru
