= Power transfer unit =

Aircraft component

In aviation, a power transfer unit (PTU) is a device that transfers hydraulic power from one of an aircraft's hydraulic systems to another in the event that the other system has failed or been turned off.

The PTU is used when, for example, there is right hydraulic system pressure but no left hydraulic system pressure. In this example, the PTU transfers hydraulic power from the right hydraulic system to the left hydraulic system. A PTU consists of a hydraulic motor paired with a hydraulic pump via a shaft.

As the connection is purely mechanical, there is no intermixing of hydraulic fluid between the left and right hydraulic systems during PTU operation.

== Design philosophy ==
Large transport category aircraft with hydraulically powered flight controls and utilities typically have multiple, independent hydraulic systems powered by a combination of engine-driven and electrically driven hydraulic pumps. Multiple hydraulic systems are typically needed for redundancy, where for instance if one system fails or loses hydraulic fluid, a surviving system may still provide sufficient power for critical systems to continue safe flight and landing.

On airliners or business jets with powered flight controls, it is typical to have at least two hydraulic power control units (actuators) for each critical flight control surface — these are the elevators, rudder and ailerons. Only two sources might be used if some form of mechanical reversion is present (i.e. the pilot can still fly the aeroplane manually, but with some difficulty, via mechanical linkages and cables if hydraulic power is lost).

On fly-by-wire aircraft, at least three independent power sources are needed. Spoilers and flaps meanwhile are considered secondary flight controls, and may only have a single hydraulic power source, providing the flight control can be deployed symmetrically.

Likewise, landing gear, brakes and nosewheel steering are systems which are not considered critical for flight, and are subsequently typically only powered by a single hydraulic system on an airliner or business jet.

Where an aircraft utility is powered by a single hydraulic system, PTUs become beneficial in allowing a single source of power, e.g. a pump powered by one surviving engine, to power more than one hydraulic system if the source of power in that system has failed. PTUs only work on the proviso that the system has not punctured and lost its fluid, because they do not permit fluid transfer, only the transfer of mechanical work.

For example, on the original design of the Airbus A320, the landing gear hydraulics (extension/retraction, brakes and steering) were solely powered from the green (left hand) system, powered by the left-hand engine driven pump. In the event of a port engine failure during take-off, the landing gear would not be able to retract as there is no auxiliary motorpump in the green hydraulic system on an A320. (Modern A320s have the nosewheel steering powered by the yellow system.)

The PTU solves this problem by allowing a rotary mechanical coupling between both systems, so the engine driven pump for the yellow (right hand) system on the starboard engine, which is oversized for normal hydraulic demand, can dump the excess power into the green system via the PTU, and allow powered landing gear retraction to continue, while maintaining hydraulic pressure to the green system flight controls as well.

Assuring landing gear retraction in a failure case is one potential assurance provided by a PTU. Alternatively, the designer may elect to have a second electric motorpump perform this role if a PTU is not desired. An additional motorpump may be heavier than a PTU however, and complex trade studies may favor one option or the other, depending on which failure cases are considered and how important weight is in the trade-off.

== Uni-directional & bi-directional PTUs ==
On the Airbus A320, the yellow system may power the green system, but because it is also bi-directional, if the starboard engine fails, the green system can help to power the yellow system by dumping excess power into it via the same mechanism. This is also known as a 'reversible' PTU.

On some other aircraft, the direction of rotation of the PTU, and thereby the fluid flow through it, may be designed to work in only one direction. The Citation X business jet is one such aircraft with a uni-directional PTU, protected by check-valves and a back-pressure stall line, designed to allow the right hand hydraulic system to assist the left hand hydraulic system and the left hand auxiliary motorpump to retract the landing gear during a port engine failure only.

On yet other aircraft, the function of a bi-directional reversible PTU can be accomplished with two uni-directional PTUs installed side-by-side arranged in opposite orientations to each other. The hydraulic system of the CH-47 Chinook helicopter uses twin uni-directional PTUs in this fashion.

== In-line & bent-axis PTUs ==
Hydraulic power transfer units are essentially nothing more than a hydraulic motor coupled to a hydraulic pump via a shaft; as such, they can be any kind of motor or pump such as a vane, gear, impeller or an in-line piston, or a variable displacement in-line piston pump.

Commonly though, PTUs are paired in-line piston motors/pumps, in either bent or straight axis arrangements.

A straight-axis in-line piston pump/motor relies on a canted internal swashplate to drive the piston shoes up and down around the internal piston slipway of the pump, lubricated by the fluid itself — this kind of PTU may appear to resemble two cylinders bolted together, with an inlet and outlet port at either end. An example of a straight axis in-line PTU can be found in the Cessna Citation X hydraulic system.

A bent-axis in-line piston pump works the same way, but forgoes the canted swashplate; instead the whole rotating group is tilted to achieve the piston displacement. An example of a bent-axis in-line PTU can be found on the Hawker 4000 hydraulic system.

In yet further representations, a bent-axis fixed-displacement motor/pump can be mated with a straight-axis variable displacement motorpump, as in the case of the Airbus A320 PTU.

== Mechanism of operation & distinctive noises ==
The mechanism by which a PTU works is by surging, PTUs self-start by pure mechanical influence alone resulting from the delta-pressure between the two hydraulic systems it is connected to. Consequently, a PTU accelerates very rapidly under the delta-P induced load, and then stops just as suddenly once the pressure equalizes. Each pressure surge may only be a second long, causing a stop-start mode of operation.

In practice, this results in a 'whoosh-whoosh' sudden spool up and spool down, which produces a loud noise that can be likened to a barking dog. Passengers who have flown on the Airbus A320 will frequently hear the PTU 'barking dog', generally when only one engine is running, or when the yellow system electric motorpump is the only active hydraulic power source; the PTU is mechanically activated in these cases. Consequently, the PTU is normally only heard on start-up or shut down. Very rarely is it heard in flight unless a momentary power deficit is present when retracting the gear, or a hydraulic fault has occurred.

In Airbus literature, it is stated that the PTU 'self-tests', on startup, however the PTU does not contain any electronic motor assistance and cannot be commanded to start; it starts by itself only when hydraulic pressure is present. However, solenoid energized shut-off valves can isolate the PTU via a push-button switch (pb/sw) in the cockpit, but this feature is rarely used.
