= Torsen =

Type of limited-slip differential used in automobiles

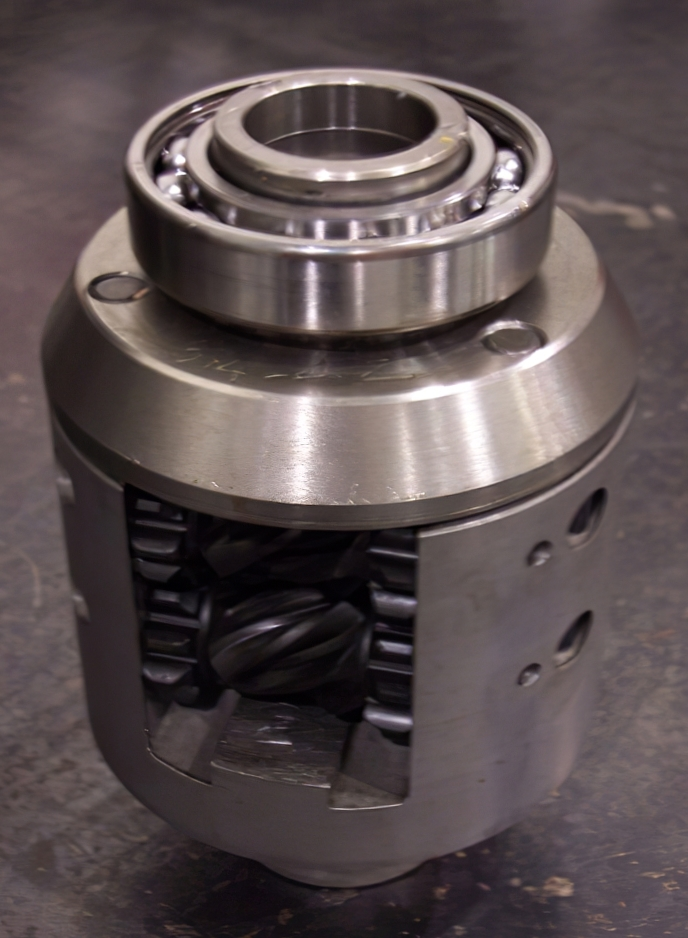
Torsen differential from an Audi quattro

Torsen Torque-Sensing (full name Torsen traction) is a type of differential used in automobiles.

It was invented by American Vernon Gleasman and manufactured by the Gleason Corporation. Torsen is a portmanteau of Torque-Sensing. TORSEN and TORSEN Traction are registered trademarks of JTEKT Torsen North America Inc (formerly Zexel Corporation, formerly Gleason Power Systems). All Torsen differentials have their origin in the Dual-Drive Differential that was invented and patented by Gleasman in 1958.

== Use ==
Torsen differentials can be used in one or more positions on a motor vehicle:

- center—used to apportion torque appropriately between front and rear axles on an all-wheel drive vehicle.
- rear—used to apportion torque appropriately between left and right sides in rear axles. This may be on either a rear-wheel drive or a four-wheel drive vehicle.
- front—used to apportion torque appropriately between left and right sides in front axles. This may be on either a front-wheel drive or a four-wheel drive vehicle.

A four-wheel-drive vehicle, for example, may use one, two, or three Torsen differentials.

== Types ==
As of 2008, there are three types of Torsen differentials.

1. The original Torsen T-1 (Type A) uses crossed axis helical gears to limit torque split. The Type I can be designed for higher torque bias ratios than the Type II, but typically has higher backlash and the potential for noise, vibration, and harshness (NVH) issues, and requires a precise setup/installation.
2. The later Torsen T-2 (Type B) uses a parallel gear arrangement to achieve a similar effect. There is also a specialist application of the T-2, known as the T-2R (RaceMaster).
3. The latest Torsen T-3 (Type C) is a planetary type differential, in that the nominal torque split is not 50:50. The Type C is available as single or twin version; the Torsen twin C differential has front and center differential in the same unit.

The Torsen T-3 is currently employed as the center differential in all non-Haldex Traction Audi models with a ZF-sourced automatic transmission Quattro four-wheel drive, such as: Audi A6, Audi A7, and Audi Q7. Audi uses a mechanical "Crown Wheel" center differential for all longitudinal implementations using dual-clutch transmissions, such as the 2013/14 S4/RS4. Alfa Romeo used a Torsen C twin differential in the Alfa Romeo 156 Crosswagon Q4 and also in the 159, Alfa Romeo Brera and Spider Q4 models. Also, Toyota uses a Torsen T-3 in the center differential of the 4Runner Limited, FJ Cruiser 6-speed manual, Sequoia, Land Cruiser, Land Cruiser Prado and Lexus GX470, with manual locking feature, and General Motors used a Torsen T-3 center differential in the transfer case of the Chevrolet TrailBlazer SS and Saab 9-7X (Aero model only).

=== Behaviour of Torsen differentials ===
The Torsen differential works just like a conventional differential, but can lock up if a torque imbalance occurs, the maximum ratio of torque imbalance being defined by the torque bias ratio (TBR). When a Torsen has a 3:1 TBR, that means that one side of the differential can handle up to 3/4 while the other side would have to only handle 1/4 of applied torque. During acceleration under asymmetric traction conditions, so long as the higher traction side can handle the higher applied torque, no relative wheelspin will occur. When the traction difference exceeds the TBR, the slower output side of the differential receives the tractive torque of the faster wheel multiplied by the TBR; any extra torque remaining from applied torque contributes to the angular acceleration of the faster output side of the differential.

The TBR should not be confused with the uneven torque-split feature in the planetary-type Torsen III. The planetary gearset allows a Torsen III center differential to distribute torque unevenly between front and rear axles during normal (full traction) operation without inducing wind-up in the drivetrain. This feature is independent of the torque bias ratio.

=== Torsens in front and/or rear axles ===
When a vehicle is in a turn, the outer wheel will rotate faster than the inner wheel. Friction in the differential will oppose motion, and that will work to slow the faster side and speed up the slower/inner side. This leads to asymmetric torque distributions in drive wheels, matching the TBR. Cornering in this manner will reduce the torque applied to the outer tire, leading to possibly greater cornering power, unless the inner wheel is overpowered (which is easier to do than with an open differential). When the inner tire (which has less traction due to weight transfer from lateral acceleration) is overpowered, it angularly accelerates up to the outer wheel speed (small percent wheel spin) and the differential locks, and if the traction difference does not exceed the TBR, the outer wheel will then have a higher torque applied to it. If the traction difference exceeds the TBR, the outer tire gets the tractive torque of the inner wheel multiplied by the TBR, and the remaining applied torque to the differential contributes to wheel spin up.

When a Torsen differential is employed, the slower-moving wheel always receives more torque than the faster-moving wheel. The Torsen T-2R RaceMaster is the only Torsen to have a preload clutch. So, even if a wheel is airborne, torque is applied to the other side. If one wheel were raised in the air, the regular Torsen units would act like an open differential, and no torque would be transferred to the other wheel. This is where the parking brake "trick" can help out. If the parking brake is applied, assuming that the parking brake applies even resistance to each side, then the drag to the airborne side is "multiplied" through the differential, and TBR times the drag torque is applied to the other side. So, the ground side would see (TBR X drag torque) minus drag torque, and that may restore motion either forward or in reverse. In Hummer/HMMWV applications, there are both front and rear Torsen differentials, so the use of the main brakes will operate this "trick" on both axles simultaneously.

=== Torsen users ===
Torsen differentials are used in many of the various Audi quattro models, excluding the A3 and S3 and TT, which have transverse-mounted engines and use Haldex Traction 4WD systems.

It is also used in the third- and fourth-generation Toyota Supra (Optional) and third-generation Toyota Soarer, the B5 platform revision of the Volkswagen Passat 4motion (based upon the Audi A4), Mazda MX-5/Miata 1994 to 1995 have a Torsen Type I and late 1995 to 2002 models have a Torsen Type II, the 2002-2003 model year of the Nissan Maxima SE 6 speed manual, the Honda S2000, and 1999-2002 S15 Nissan Silvia Spec R. The Lancia Delta Integrale, the Peugeot 405 T16, as well as the 1999-2002 model Pontiac Firebird and Chevrolet Camaro, had a Torsen differential. Rover Group fitted Torsen type 1, and later type 2, units to their range of high performance, front-wheel drive turbocharged models (220, 420, 620ti, and 800 Vitesse). The use of the Torsen differential was preferred by Rover Group; it is much better at controlling wheel spin in front-wheel drive vehicles than electronic systems which reduce engine power and therefore performance.

The Humvee uses two Torsens, front and rear, with a normal manually lockable center differential (NVG242HD AMG transfer case) in the center.

Other users of the Torsen limited-slip differential include the Toyota GT86 and the Subaru BRZ, both released in 2012.

The first Ford company vehicle to use a Torsen differential was the 2002 Ford Ranger FX4 (renamed in FX4 Level II from 2003) all of which used T-2R in the rear differential only. Starting in 2012, the Ford F-150 SVT Raptor uses a front Torsen differential and the Ford Mustang Boss 302 uses a rear Torsen differential.

AMG offered Torsen differentials as an option as early as 1988 for new as well as for retrofitting for 107, 116, 123, 126 series Mercedes Benz cars.

Toyota Altezza (sold in Europe, the U.S. and Canada as Lexus IS200 and IS300) came with a Torsen differential. For Lexus models it was included with all IS300 models with manual transmission and with the IS200 Sport, and was optionally factory equipped with automatic transmission. The Toyota Altezza was standard on all manual transmission SXE10 models (with the 5th-generation Beams 3S-GE engine and J160 6-speed manual transmission).

== Torsen applications ==
=== Center ===
- Alfa Romeo Q4 versions: 156 Crosswagon & Sportwagon, 159, Brera & Spider Q4
- Quattro versions of Audi:
  - Audi Quattro (1987-current)
  - Audi 80 & 90, Audi S2, Audi RS2 Avant
  - Audi 100 / Audi 200 / Audi 5000
  - Audi Coupé quattro
  - Audi A4, Audi S4, Audi RS4
  - Audi A5, Audi S5, Audi RS5
  - Audi A6, Audi S6, Audi RS6
  - Audi A7, Audi S7, Audi RS 7
  - Audi A8, Audi S8
  - Audi allroad quattro
  - Audi Q5, Audi SQ5
  - Audi Q7, Audi SQ7
  - Audi Q8, Audi SQ8, Audi RSQ8
  - Audi V8 (manual transmission)
- Chevrolet TrailBlazer SS
- Lexus GS, Lexus GX, LS 600h / LS 600h L, LX, Lexus IS
- Mitsubishi Triton 5th Generation
- Saab 9-7X Aero
- Toyota: 4Runner (All 4WD 4Runner from 2003-2009) and 4Runner Limited (2010 to present), FJ Cruiser 6-speed manual, Toyota Landcruiser 200, Toyota Landcruiser 120/150, Toyota Fortuner, Toyota Land Cruiser Prado, Toyota Sequoia
- Volkswagen: Passat (badged as 4motion) (B5 platform), Amarok (permanent 4motion version only), Touareg (2011 to present, without offroad package)

=== Center and rear ===
- Audi V8 with manual transmission

=== Front and rear axles ===
- Humvee
- Mitsubishi Pajero Evolution
- Toyota GR Yaris

=== Front axle only ===
- Honda/Acura Integra Type R
- Alfa Romeo: GT, 147 Q2
- Honda Civic Si (2006-current)
- Honda Civic 1.8 VTi Europe & UK (5-door & Aerodeck Wagon, 1996–2000)
- Ford Focus RS
- Mitsubishi Pajero
- Nissan Maxima SE 6 Speed manual
- Nissan Sentra SE-R Spec-V
- Oldsmobile Calais W41 (7 cars equipped from the factory, C41 option code)
- Oldsmobile Achieva W41 (7-10 cars equipped from the factory, C41 option code)
- Rover 200 Coupe Turbo, 200 BRM/LE, 220 Turbo, 420 Turbo, 620 Ti, 820 Vitesse (200PS version only)
- Honda Accord Type R
- Subaru Impreza STI (2005-current)
- Ford F-150 SVT Raptor (2012-2022)
- Ford Super Duty Tremor (2020-current)
- Renault Megane RS
- Peugeot RCZ R
- Peugeot 208 GTI by Peugeot Sport
- Peugeot 308 GTI by Peugeot Sport

=== Rear axle only ===
- AMG retro-fitted and optional for: 107, 116, 123, 126 Mercedes cars
- Audi V8 with automatic transmission
- Audi R8
- Alfa Romeo: 155 Q4, 164 Q4
- BMW Z3
- Citroën BX 4x4 with ABS (same as Peugeot 405 4x4)
- Dodge/Ram Heavy Duty Equipped with 11.5 AAM Rear Axle (2003-current)
- Ford Ranger FX4 2002 only, Ranger FX4 Level II (2003-2009)
- Honda S2000
- Hyundai Genesis Coupe
- Lancia Delta Integrale
- Lexus IS, Lexus IS F, Lexus LC, Lexus LFA, Lexus RC F, Lexus GS F, Lexus LS 460 F Sport trim
- Maserati Biturbo
- Mazda Miata/MX-5 (option on 1994-2005 manual transmission models)
- Mazda RX-7 FD3S
- Nissan Silvia S15 SpecR
- Nissan Skyline R34 GTT, 25GT-X, 25GT-V Manual
- Peugeot 405 4x4 with ABS (same as Citroën BX 4x4)
- Peugeot 505 turbo sedan (1989 only)
- Subaru Impreza WRX STI (2007–current)
- Toyota Caldina ST215-W only
- Toyota Celica GT-Four, Toyota Supra, Toyota Soarer, Toyota Aristo, Toyota Mark II, Toyota Chaser, Toyota Cresta, Toyota Verossa, Toyota Altezza, Toyota RAV4, Toyota MR2 Spyder, Limited, Toyota GR Yaris
- Pontiac Firebird 4th Generation (1999-2002)
- Chevrolet Camaro 4th Generation (1999-2002)
- Chevrolet Camaro SS, Pontiac Firehawk & Comp T/A 4th Generation (optional in 1996-1997)
- Subaru Legacy Spec. B (2007-2009 in US market)
- 2012 and 2013 Ford Mustang Boss 302, option. Standard on Laguna Seca Edition.
- 2014 Ford Mustang Shelby GT500, option.
- 2014 Ford Mustang GT, included in GT Track Package.
- 2015-2017 Ford Mustang GT, included in Performance Package.
- Toyota GT86 (also sold as the Subaru BRZ and Scion FR-S in various markets)
- Ford F-450/500 Super Duty (1999-current)
- Ford Explorer Timberline (2022-2024)
