= Audi Coupé =

Audi Coupé/Cabriolet
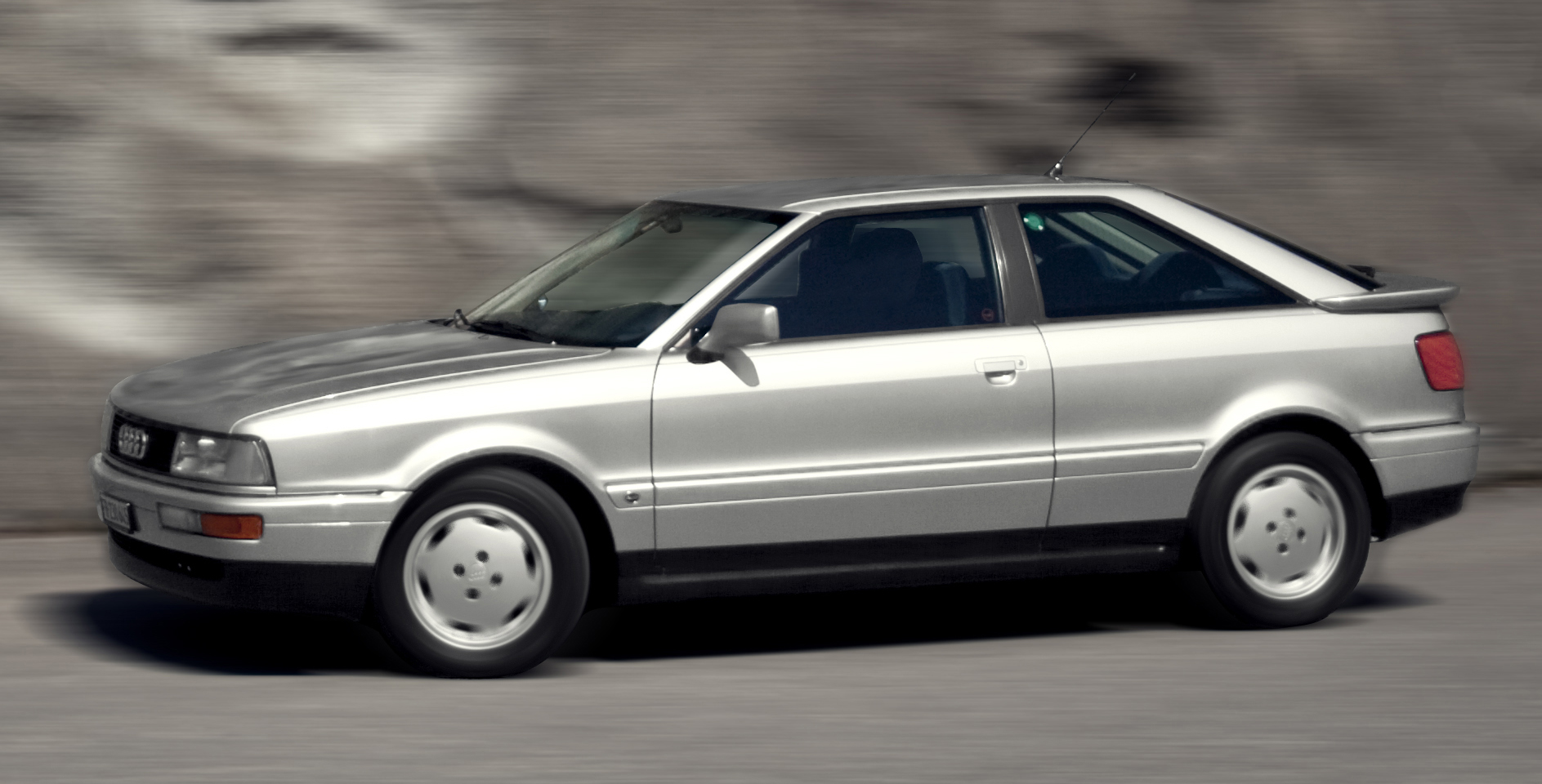
- Audi Coupé (B3, pre-facelift)

Overview
- Manufacturer: Audi AG
- Production: 1980–2000

Body and chassis
- Class: Sports car, Coupé
- Body style: 2-door coupé (1980–1988); 3-door liftback coupé (1988–1996); 2-door convertible (1991–2000)
- Layout: Front-engine, front-wheel-drive Front-engine, four-wheel-drive
- Platform: Volkswagen Group B
- Related: Audi 80

Chronology
- Predecessor: Audi 100 Coupé S
- Successor: Cabriolet: Audi A4 Cabriolet; Coupe: Audi A5

The Audi Coupé is a coupé version of the Audi 80, first shown in 1980. The bodywork was shared with the Audi Quattro. The second generation Coupé arrived in late 1988 and was based on the B3 Audi 80, albeit with a different suspension. The Coupé remained in production until the end of 1996 and spawned the Audi S2 series of sports versions. A convertible model arrived in 1991, called simply the Cabriolet, and remained in production until 2000.

== Coupé B2 (1980) ==
Audi Coupé B2 (81/85)
- Audi Coupé GT (facelift model)

Overview
- Production: 1980–1988
- Assembly: Germany: Ingolstadt
- Designer: Giorgetto Giugiaro

Body and chassis
- Body style: 2-door coupé
- Layout: longitudinal front engine, front-wheel drive or quattro permanent four-wheel drive
- Platform: Volkswagen Group B2
- Related: Audi 80/4000; Audi Quattro

Powertrain
- Engine: 1595 cc YN I4; 1781 cc DD-DZ I4; 1921 cc WN I5; 1994 cc HP/JS/SK I5; 2144 cc KE/KL I5; 2226 cc HY/JT/KV/KX I5; 2309 cc NG I5

Dimensions
- Wheelbase: 2,538 mm (99.9 in)
- Length: 4,349–4,421 mm (171.2–174.1 in)
- Width: 1,682 mm (66.2 in)
- Height: 1,350–1,376 mm (53.1–54.2 in)
- Curb weight: 950–1,200 kg (2,094–2,646 lb)

The Audi Coupé (B2, Typ 81/85) was a two-door coupé produced and sold by Audi from 1980 to 1988. It was offered as a less expensive version of its turbocharged, permanent four-wheel drive Audi Quattro without turbocharger(s) or four wheel drive. Later, quattro was added as an option (Typ 85). Typ 81 was the internal model code for front-wheel drive Audi Coupés.

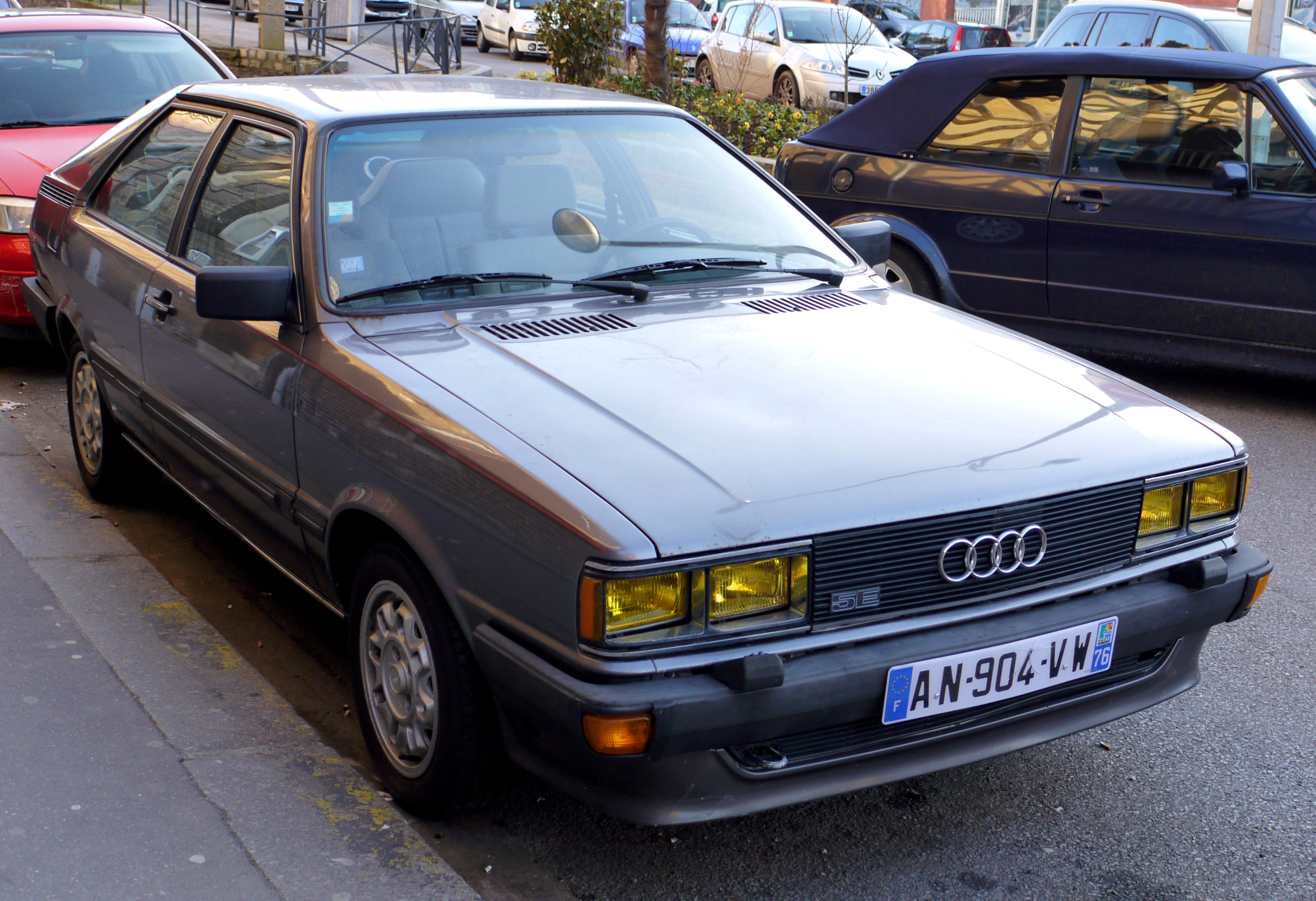
Original Audi Coupé GT 5E, with the first style of headlamps

The Coupé, first displayed at the Paris Salon 1980, featured a similar body shape to the Quattro, but without the knife-edged fender flares of the more expensive car. Mechanically, the biggest changes from the Quattro to the Coupé were the use of a naturally aspirated 1.9-litre carburettor petrol engine, 2.0-litre, 2.1-, 2.2-, or 2.3-litre fuel injected inline five-cylinder engine and a front-wheel drive drivetrain. Some lesser Coupés were also fitted with a 1.8-litre inline four-cylinder engine, injected or carburetted, and for the very first year of production a 1.6-litre "YN" 75 PS (55 kW) engine was available. The short-lived 1.6 was the only Coupé not to be fitted with a black rear spoiler.

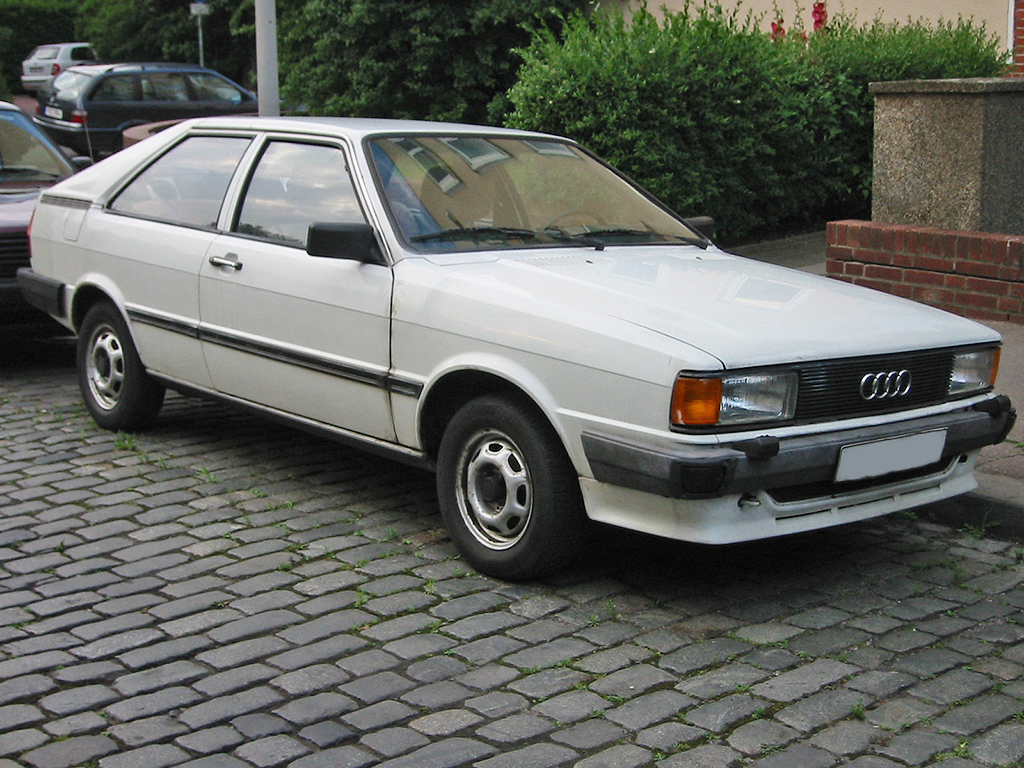
1983–1984 Coupé GL — note body-coloured B-pillar and 13-inch steel wheels

The Coupé was available as just plain "Coupé" or GL (four-cylinders only), "Coupé GT", and "Coupé quattro" (without the GT tag). From 1986 until the end of production in late 1988, the Coupé GT was also available with the 110–112 PS (81–82 kW) 1.8-litre PV/DZ inline-four best known from the Golf GTi. For the last model year, the new 2309 cc "NG" five cylinder was available, offering 136 PS (100 kW) at 5600 rpm. This engine became available during 1987 for the last of the Audi Coupés sold in the US, where it produced 130 hp (97 kW) at 5,700 rpm as opposed to the 110 hp (82 kW) at 5500 rpm available from the 2.2-litre five which had been used since the facelift for model year 1985. The Coupé had originally gone on sale in the US late in model year 1981 with the 100 hp (75 kW) 2144 cc five-cylinder also used in the 5000 (Audi 100).

For the 1983 model year, European models switched from having two separate headlamps to large integrated Bosch units. Apart from changing the appearance, this also provided improved aerodynamics and better lighting.

=== Facelift ===
The updated Coupé, introduced after the German industrial holidays in the autumn of 1984, was given new, slightly sloped radiator grille and headlights, a large wrap-around bumper with integrated spotlights and turn signals, plastic sill covers, and the large rear spoiler from the Audi Quattro. These changes brought the drag coefficient down to 0.36. A new dashboard was also introduced, as was a new interior. GL and standard versions were cancelled for model year 1987 and all FWD Coupés were from then referred to as "Coupé GT".

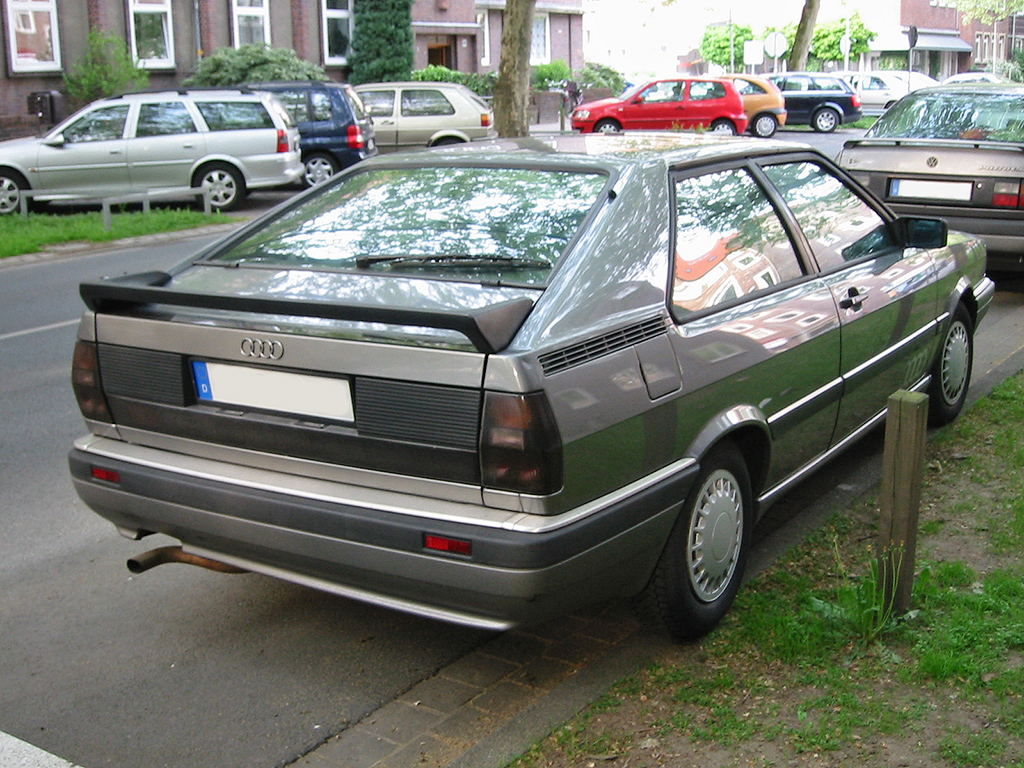
Rear view of a facelift Coupé GT

In 1985, For the 1986 model year, the Coupés (as with all Audis) were available with more catalyzed engine options. Also, the entire B2 range (Audi 80/90/Coupé) received stainless steel exhausts (for European markets at least).

==== Coupé quattro ====
Also in September 1984, Audi made available the option of the quattro permanent four-wheel drive system to produce the Audi Coupé quattro, a model which was rarer than the turbocharged Quattro model. While most common with the 2.2-litre engine (also 2.3 for the last year, introduced 1987 for the US), in some markets the 1.8-litre four-cylinder models (90 and 112 PS DS/NE/JN or DZ engines) were also available with four-wheel drive.

The Coupé and Coupé quattro models appear almost identical from the outside except for a few minor "quattro" specifics. While the GT had "COUPE GT" on the rear side windows, the CQ had the "quattro" decal as used on the Ur-Quattro. Similarly at the rear, the badging was "GT" and "quattro" respectively. The quattro versions also used the Ur-Quattro rear windscreen with "quattro" written into the heater elements (very obviously so on a cold and frosty morning), and the front grille was also adorned with the "quattro" badge from the Ur-Q. Inside, the cabin was identical except that the centre console received a differential lock switch, and LED bargraph displays in place of the GT's three analogue-style gauges. Some Coupé quattros were distinguished by a body-coloured rear spoiler.

Mechanically, the Coupé quattro depended on a combination of components from the GT and the Audi 80 quattro. The quattro permanent four-wheel drive drivetrain was almost identical to that used on the Ur-Quattro - the main differences being the use of the Coupé GT front struts, smaller 256 mm (10 in) diameter front brake disks, and lower ratios in the gearbox and rear differential. The damper and spring rates were also different from the Ur-Q. It was thus largely identical to the Audi 90 quattro and the North American Audi 4000 quattro. Wheels were 6.0Jx14", with steel or aluminium alloy rims dependent on the market. 7.0Jx15" Ronals, almost identical to the Ur-Quattro wheels, were also available. The CQ/90Q/4000Q also received their own exhaust manifold and downpipe (5-3-1, while FWD versions were 5-2-1).

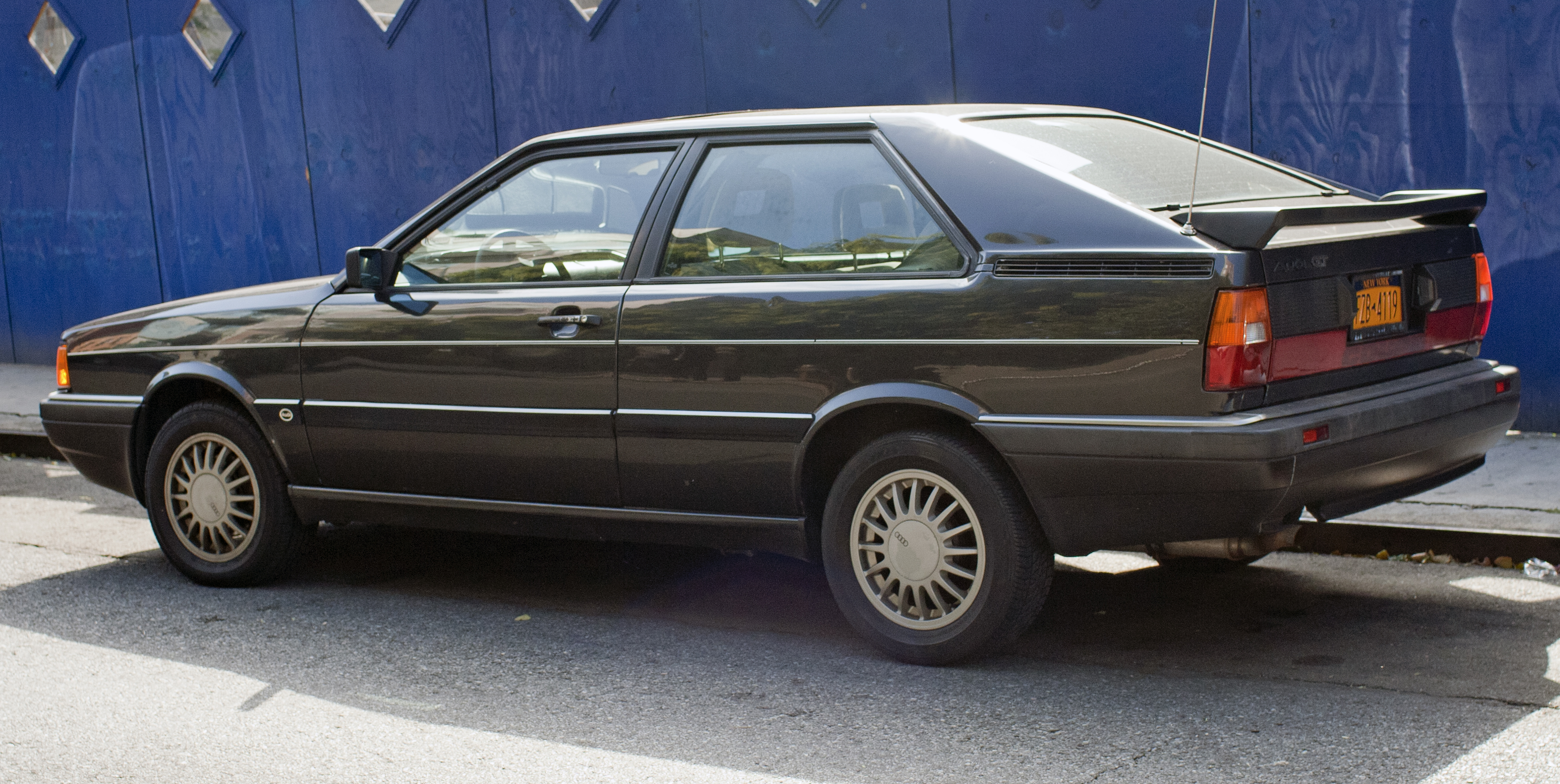
Rear view of a US market Coupé GT (1986)

From September 1980 to September 1987, 174,687 Typ 81 Coupés were built. Quattro production ran from late 1984 to 1988, and was in the total region of 8,000 cars.

Specifications, KV-engined Audi Coupé quattro
Engine type	Inline 5 cylinder
Displacement	2,226 cc (2.2 L)
Max. Power	100 kW (136 PS; 134 bhp) at 5,700 rpm
Max. Torque	186 Nm (137 lb·ft) at 3500 rpm
Compression ratio	10.0
Fuel system	Mechanical Bosch KE-Jetronic fuel injection with warm up regulator, overrun fuel shut-off and idle-speed mixture stabilising
Gearbox	5-speed manual gearbox
Service interval	15,000 km or 10,000 miles
Transmission	Permanent 4WD with lockable centre and rear differentials
Wheel and tyre size	6.0Jx14" / 195/60 HR14
Top speed	202 km/h (125.5 mph)
Acceleration	0-80 km/h (49.7 mph) 6.0 s 0-100 km/h (62.1 mph) 8,8 s
Fuel consumption	constant 56 mph = 38.7 mpg constant 75 mph = 31.0 mpg urban cycle = 21.9 mpg
Luggage capacity	15.6 cu ft (440 L)

== Coupé B3 (1988) ==
Audi Coupé B3 (Typ 8B)
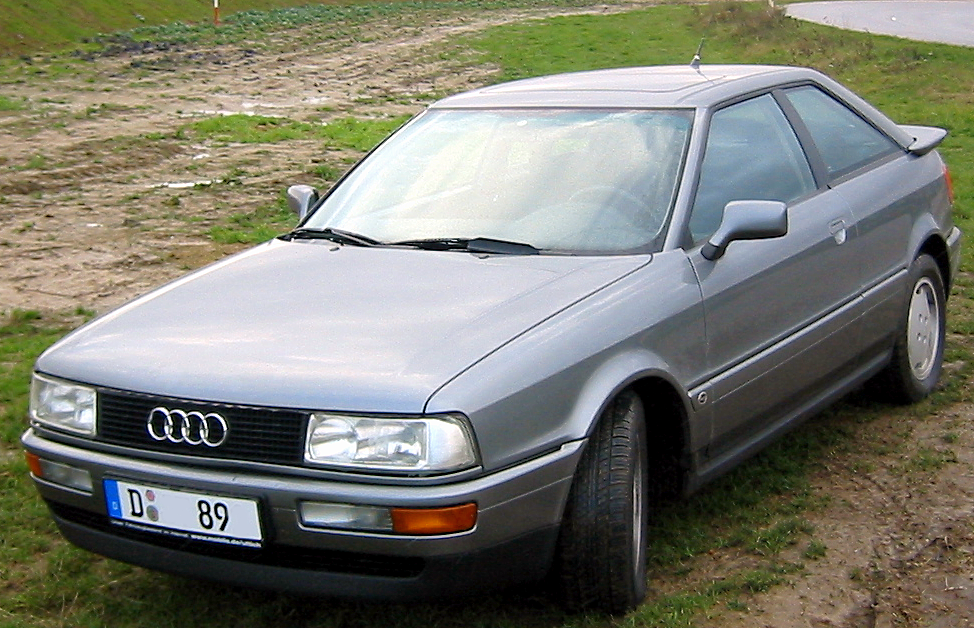
- Audi Coupé (pre-facelift model)

Overview
- Production: 1988–1996
- Assembly: Germany: Ingolstadt

Body and chassis
- Body style: 3-door liftback coupé
- Layout: longitudinal front engine, front-wheel drive or quattro permanent four-wheel drive
- Platform: Volkswagen Group B3
- Related: Audi 80 (B3); Audi 80 (B4); Audi S2

Powertrain
- Engine: 1781 cc DZ I4 (export only); 1984 cc AAD/ABK/3A I4; 1984 cc ACE 16V I4; 1994 cc NM 20V I5 (export only); 2226 cc KV I5 (export only); 2226 cc 3B/ABY turbo 20V I5; 2309 cc NG I5; 2309 cc 7A 20V I5; 2598 cc ABC V6; 2774 cc AAH V6
- Transmission: 5-speed manual; 6-speed manual (S2); 3/4-speed automatic

Dimensions
- Wheelbase: 2,555 mm (100.6 in)
- Length: 4,366 mm (171.9 in)
- Width: 1,716 mm (67.6 in)
- Height: 1,355 mm (53.3 in)
- Curb weight: 1,170–1,400 kg (2,579–3,086 lb)

In October 1988, and after a brief hiatus for the Audi Coupé, a new three-door Coupé was introduced in Europe. This generation is known internally as the Typ 8B and is basically a Typ 89 saloon with a modified rear suspension and a new front suspension system which previewed what was to come in the B4 Audi 80. When introduced it was only available with either the ten- or twenty-valve 2.3E engine, which was later joined by the 115 PS (85 kW; 113 bhp) 2.0E and a number of other versions.

In February 1989 a 20-valve version of the 2.0-liter five-cylinder engine went on sale in Italy. This was the only version of the Coupé sold in Italy, where cars of over two liters suffer a high tax penalty. It was not offered anywhere besides Italy and Portugal as it was never fitted with a catalytic converter. The engine produces 160 PS (118 kW; 158 bhp) and this model was built until July 1991. Another export-market special built during the same period was an uncatalyzed, fuel injected 112 PS (82 kW) 1.8-liter inline-four. A naturally aspirated, 136 PS (100 kW; 134 hp) 2.2E was also sold in some markets until late 1991, including the United Kingdom and Spain. In September 1990 the sporty S2 Coupé was introduced, followed one year later by a more luxury-oriented 2.8-liter V6 version. The Coupé received similar updates to the B4 Audi 80 and remained in production until December 1996. The Coupé did not have a direct replacement but was effectively succeeded by the first-generation Audi TT coupé (and roadster), sold between 1998 and 2006.

=== S2 Coupé ===
Audi offered a sports version of the Coupé called the Audi S2 from September 1990 until 1995, the first of Audi's long-running "S"-series of sporting derivatives of standard models. The S2 Coupé was meant to boost lagging sales of the Coupé and to partially replace the famous Audi Quattro. It featured the well-proven 2.2-litre in-line five-cylinder 20-valve turbo petrol engine from the Audi 200 20V, and came standard with quattro permanent four-wheel drive. Audi also launched saloon and estate versions of the S2 in 1993, although these were only built in small numbers. The revised front end was similar to the design of the Audi V8 and became Audi's new corporate look.

=== North America ===
In 1989, for the 1990 model year, North America received the Coupé quattro. It was powered by a somewhat detuned 164 hp (122 kW; 166 PS) version of the 20-valve 2.3-litre five-cylinder engine and was originally only available with a five-speed manual transmission. It was marketed in the "Grand Tourismo" (GT) style of a comfortable luxury car with sporting tendencies, as opposed to a dedicated lightweight sports car. Weighing 3,308 lb (1,500 kg) (1991 Coupé model) it was not a lightweight, especially in consideration of the 164-hp powerplant (slightly less than the European version). These models came standard with 15-inch, six-star "Speedline" wheels, leather interiors with Zebrano wood trim, additional VDO gauges mounted in the bottom of the centre console, a carbon fibre centre prop shaft, and push-button locking rear differential. The Coupé was only sold for two model years in the United States, 1990 and 1991, after which it was discontinued due to slow sales.

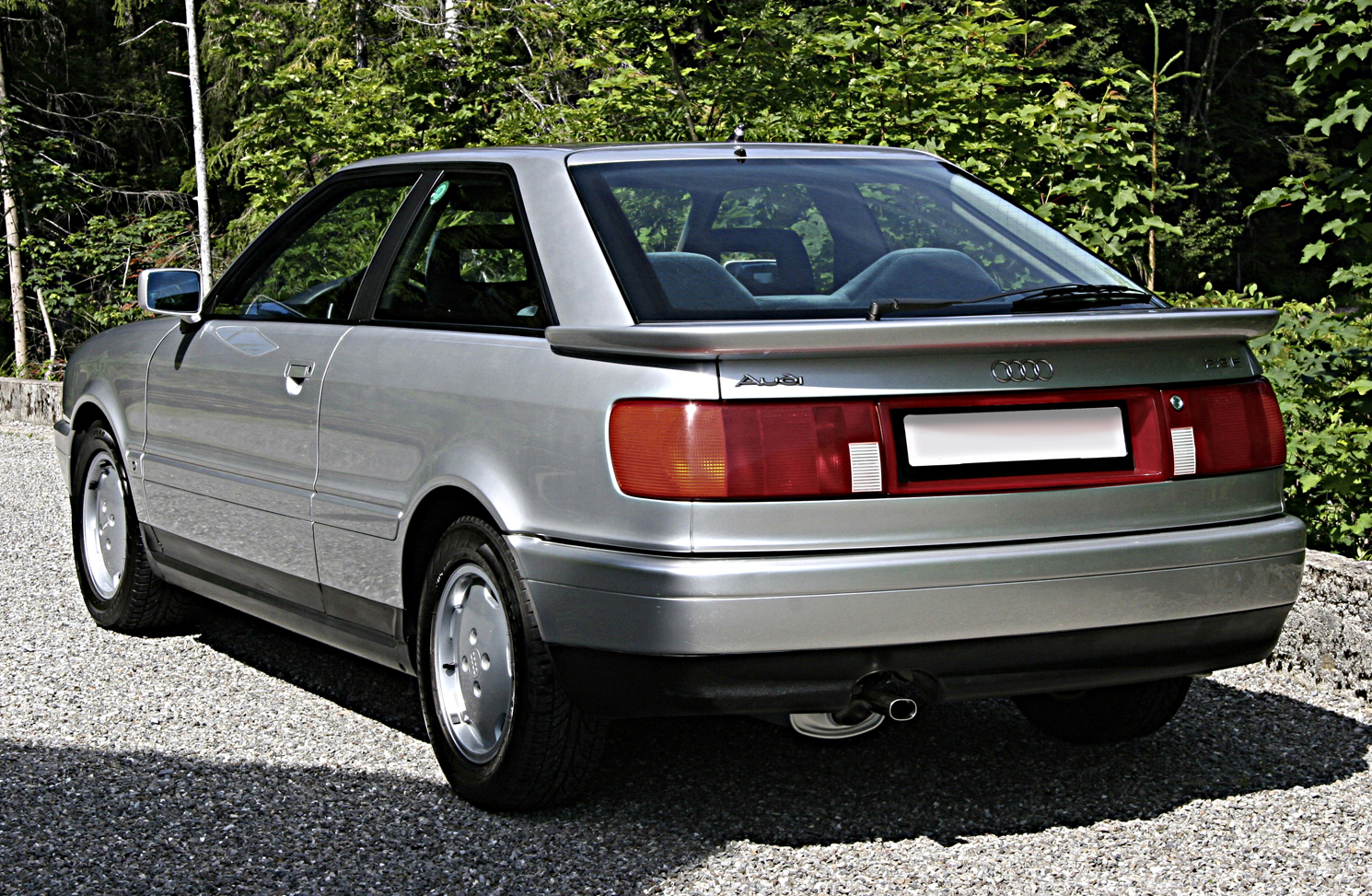
Audi Coupé 2.3E

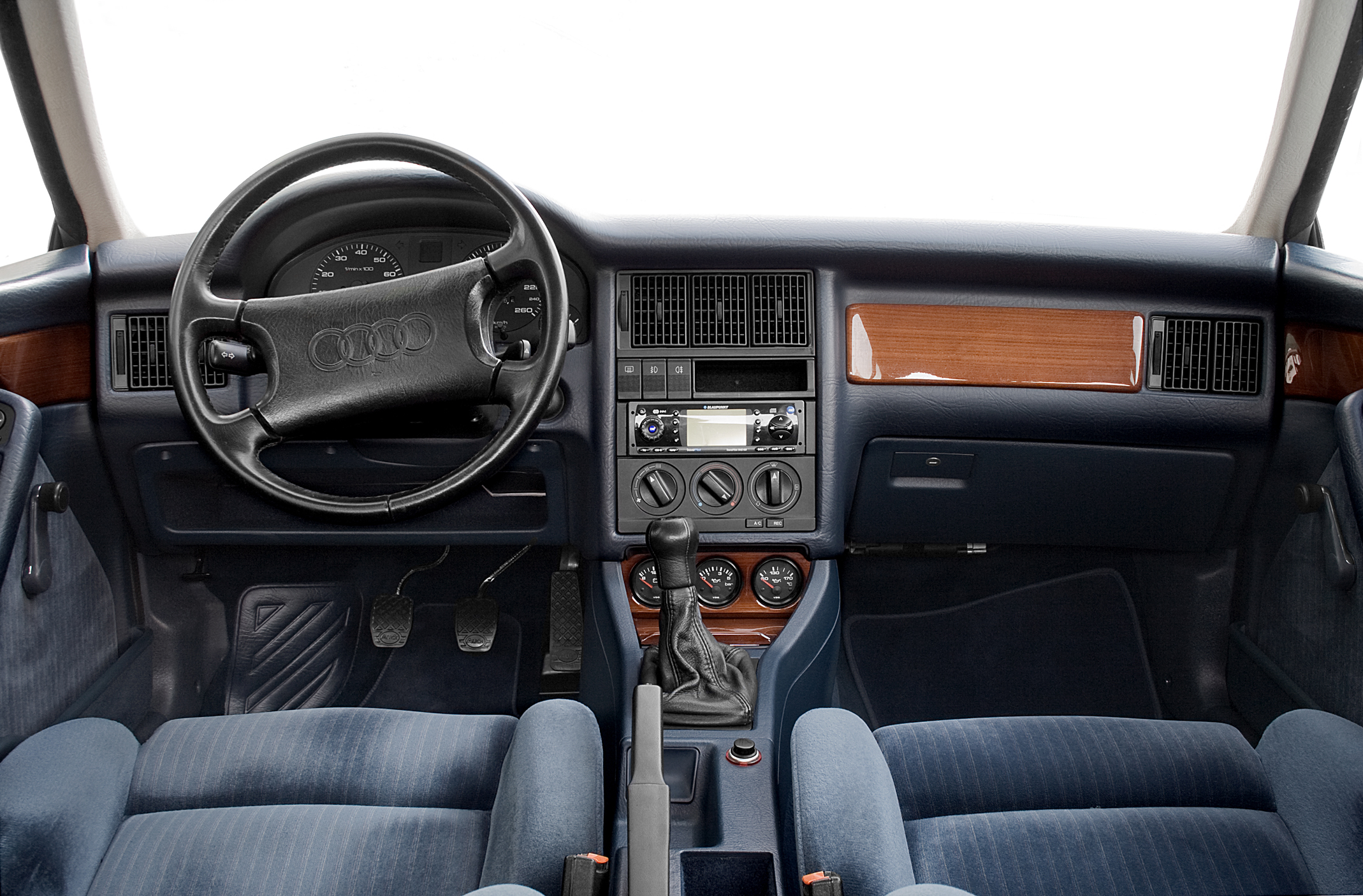
Interior (2.3E)

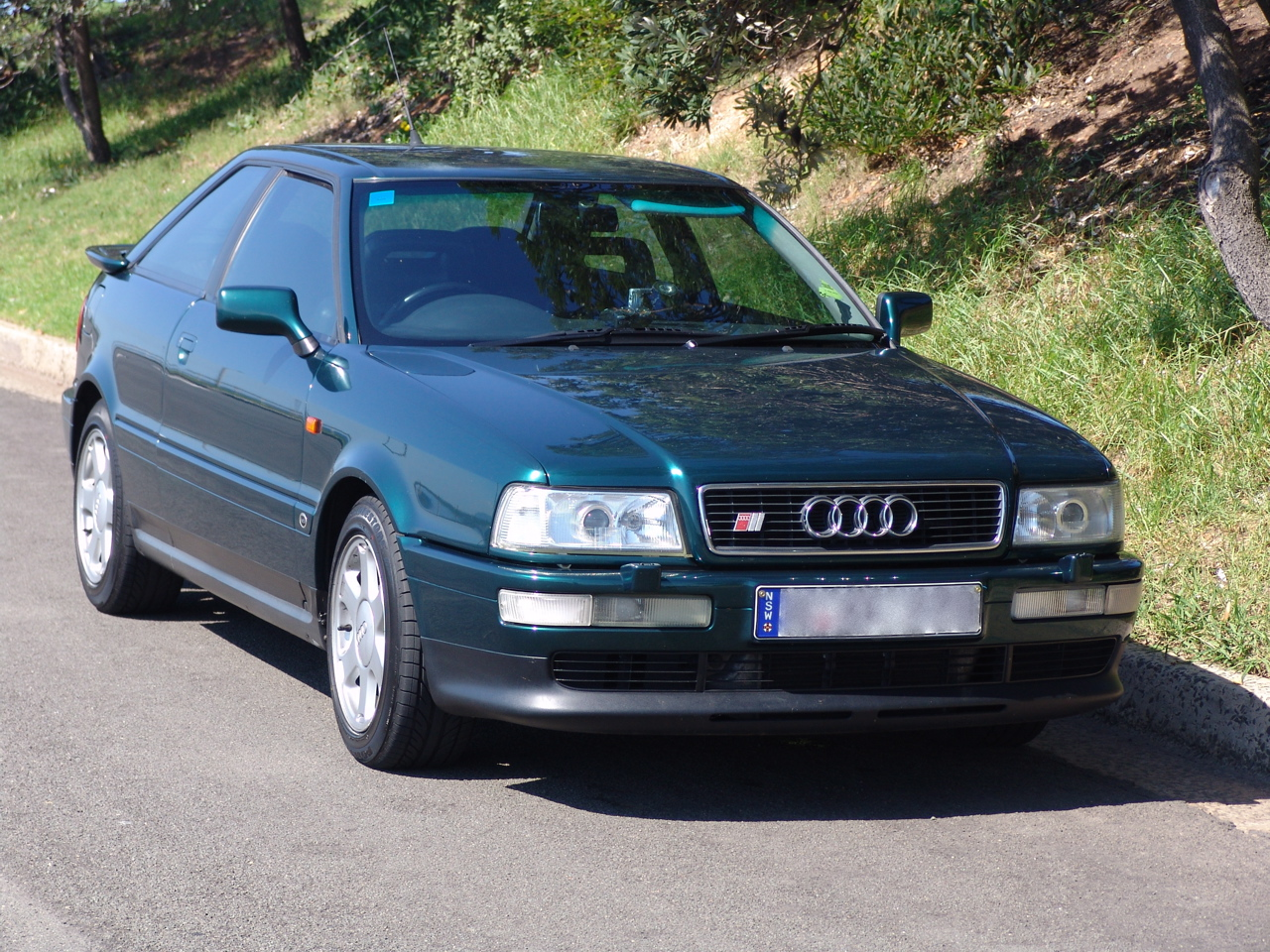
Audi S2 Coupé

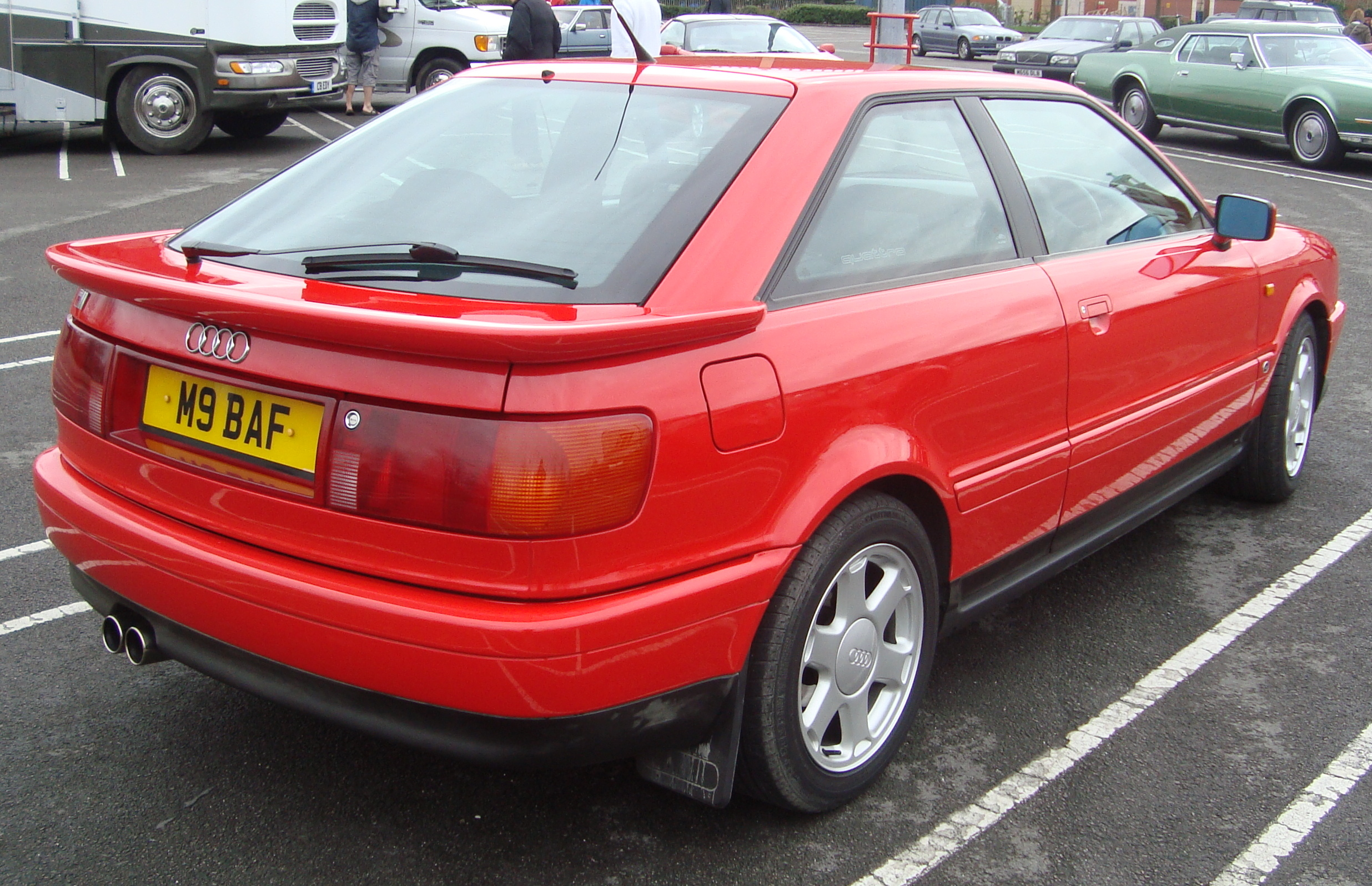
1996 Audi S2 Coupé

== Cabriolet ==
Audi Cabriolet (Typ 8G)
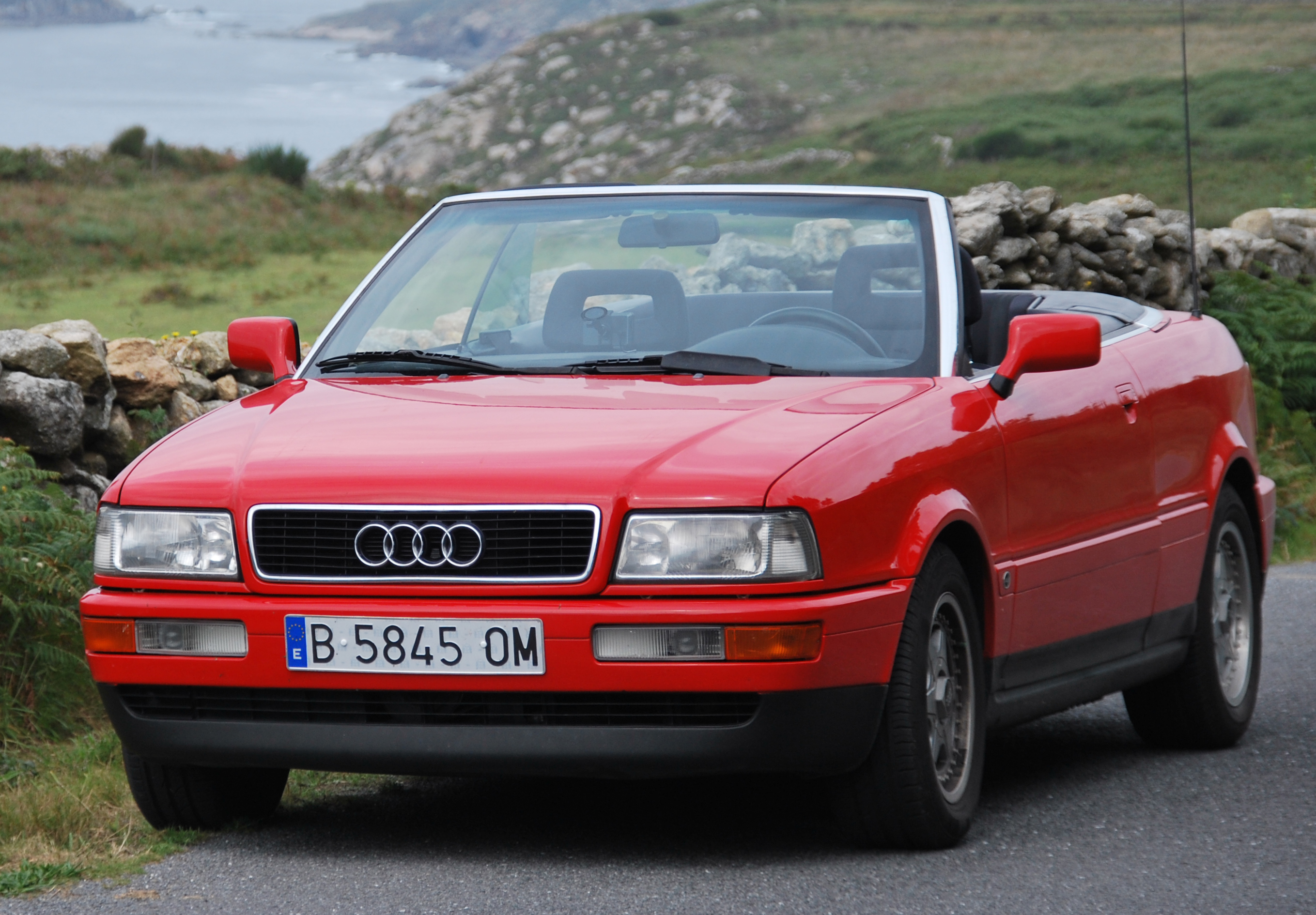
- Audi Cabriolet (pre-facelift)

Overview
- Production: 1991–2000
- Assembly: Germany: Ingolstadt (1991–1996); Germany: Osnabrück (Karmann: 1997–2000)

Body and chassis
- Body style: 2-door convertible
- Layout: longitudinal front engine, front-wheel drive
- Platform: Volkswagen Group B3
- Related: Audi 80 (B3); Audi 80 (B4); Audi A4

Dimensions
- Wheelbase: 2,560 mm (100.8 in)
- Length: 4,370 mm (172.0 in)
- Width: 1,720 mm (67.7 in)
- Height: 1,380 mm (54.3 in)
- Curb weight: 1,370–1,430 kg (3,020–3,153 lb)

The Audi Cabriolet (Typ 8G) based on the B3 Coupé, was introduced in May 1991. As a result of the heavy and expensive re-engineering involved in creating a cabriolet version, this model was produced up until the year 2000; long after the other B3 models had been replaced by B4 and even B5 vehicles. It was the company's first soft-top since the Auto Union 1000 Sp of 1959. The Cabriolet featured the updated bonnet and rear light design among other styling features from the B3-based S2 Coupé. Initially only available with the 10-valve 2.3-litre inline-five, the 2.8-litre V6 was added for the US market, and the 2.0-litre inline-four and 2.6-litre V6 from the Coupé were added as options in 1993 in Europe. The 2.0-litre was later replaced in 1997 by the new 20-valve 1.8-litre inline-four from the new A4. The rather heavy Cabriolet was solidly engineered to provide the same structural strength as the Coupé, while the windscreen was reinforced to preclude the need for a roll bar. While under consideration, the Cabriolet was not offered with the quattro four-wheel drive system. Final assembly was by Karmann in Osnabrück from 1997.

A power operated soft top was not initially offered; it would only become available from mid-1992 when the car was to be introduced to the all-important American market. In April 1997 the European market Cabriolet underwent a few minor yet visible touch-ups; such as gently redesigned bumpers incorporating lights from the Porsche 911 (993), projection lens headlamps, as well as other minor changes. In addition to this facelift, a special edition was introduced for the European market under the name Sunline. Among other extras, it was equipped with all leather interior, air conditioning, 16-inch alloy wheels, a power soft-top and a leather steering wheel. A 'Final Edition' with similar extras became available from 1999 until the end of production.

In November 1993, the 2.8-liter V6 equipped Cabriolet entered the US market, where it remained on sale until the end of the 1998 model year. Altogether, 5,445 were sold there over 5 years.

A 4-seater mid-sized Audi convertible was not available again until 2002, when the B6-based A4 Cabriolet (Typ 8H) was introduced.

Overall, a total of around 71,350 Cabriolets were built.

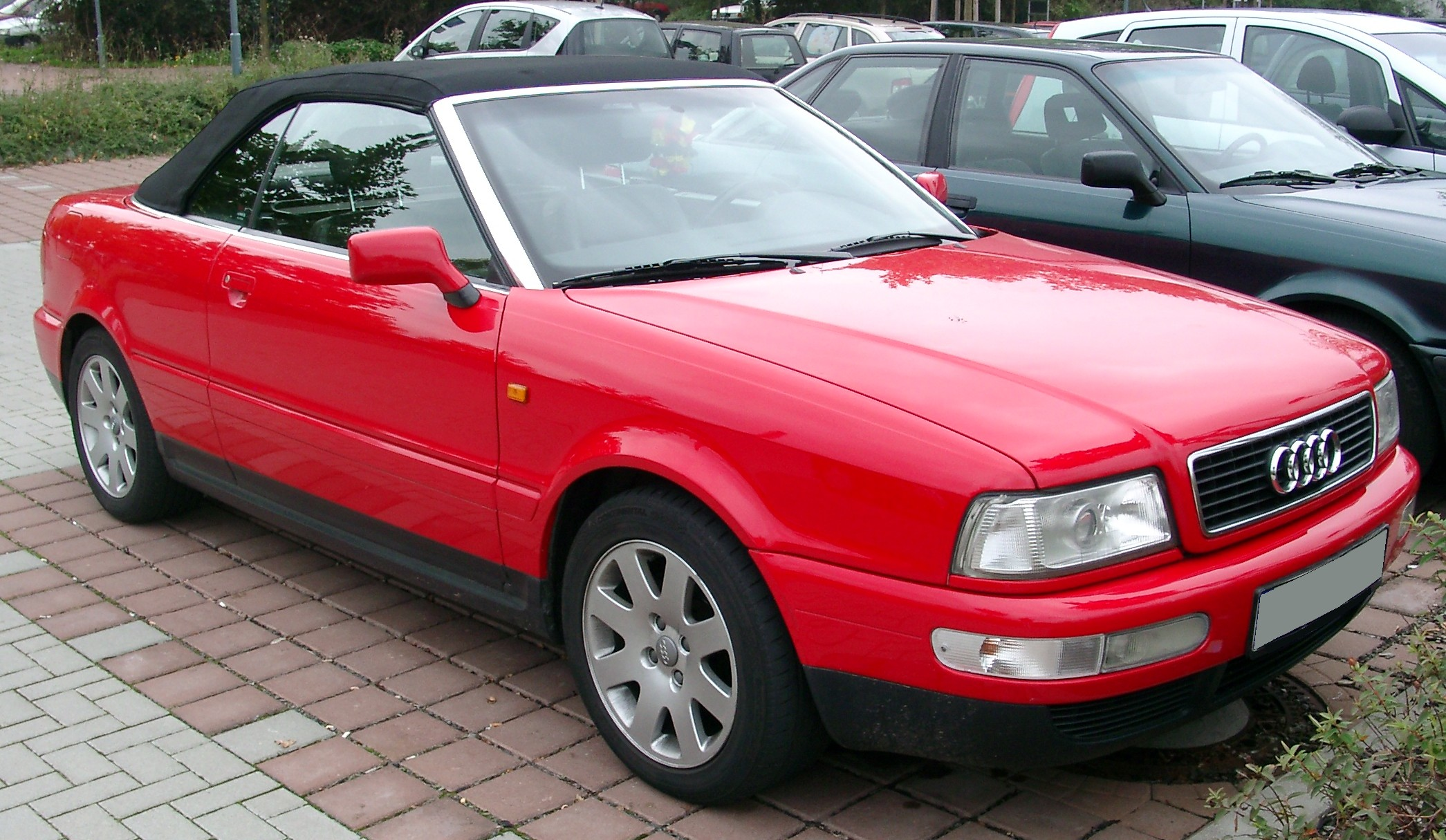
1997 facelift model

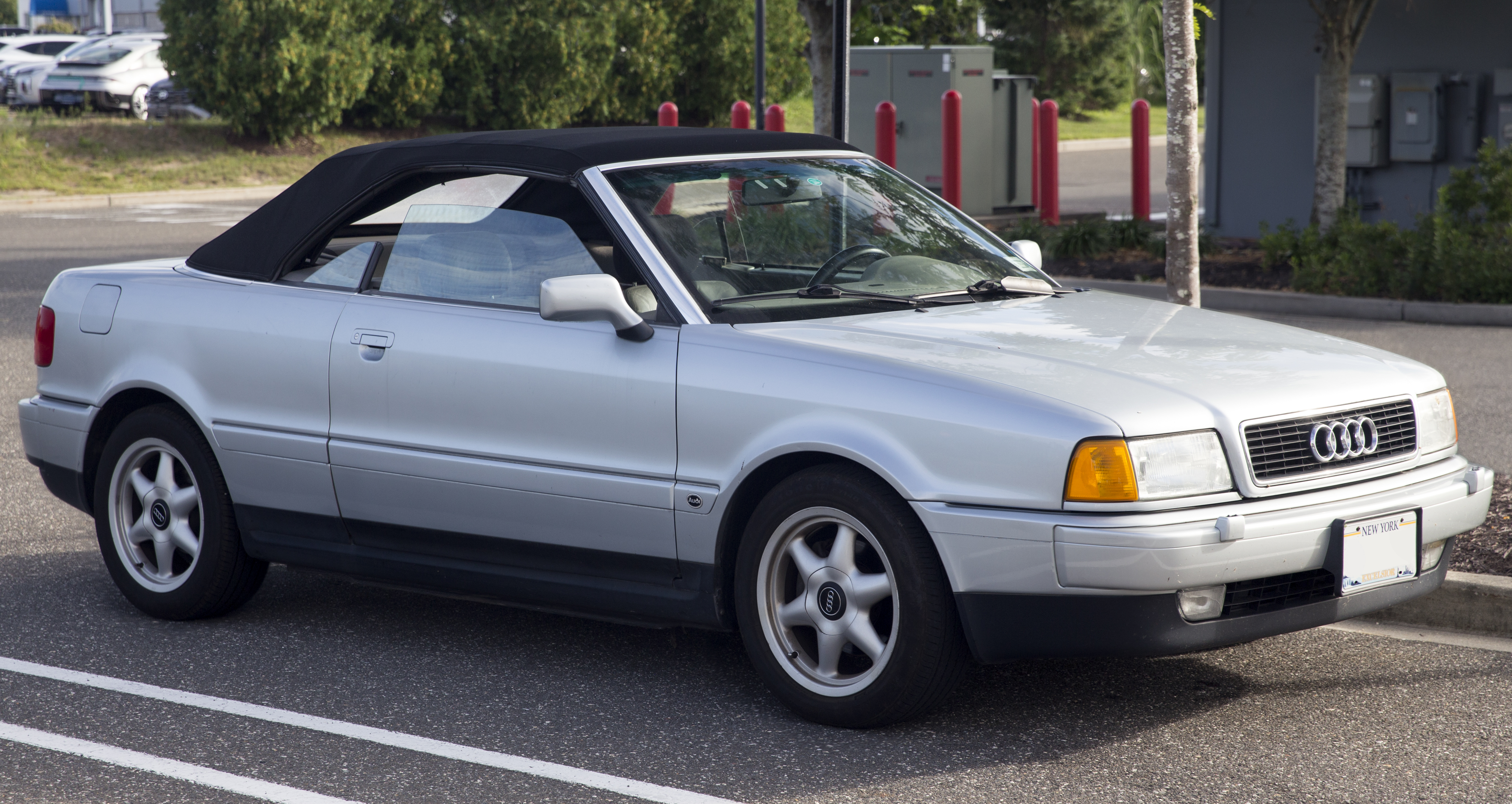
The US model was not facelifted. Note the more prominent bumpers (1997).

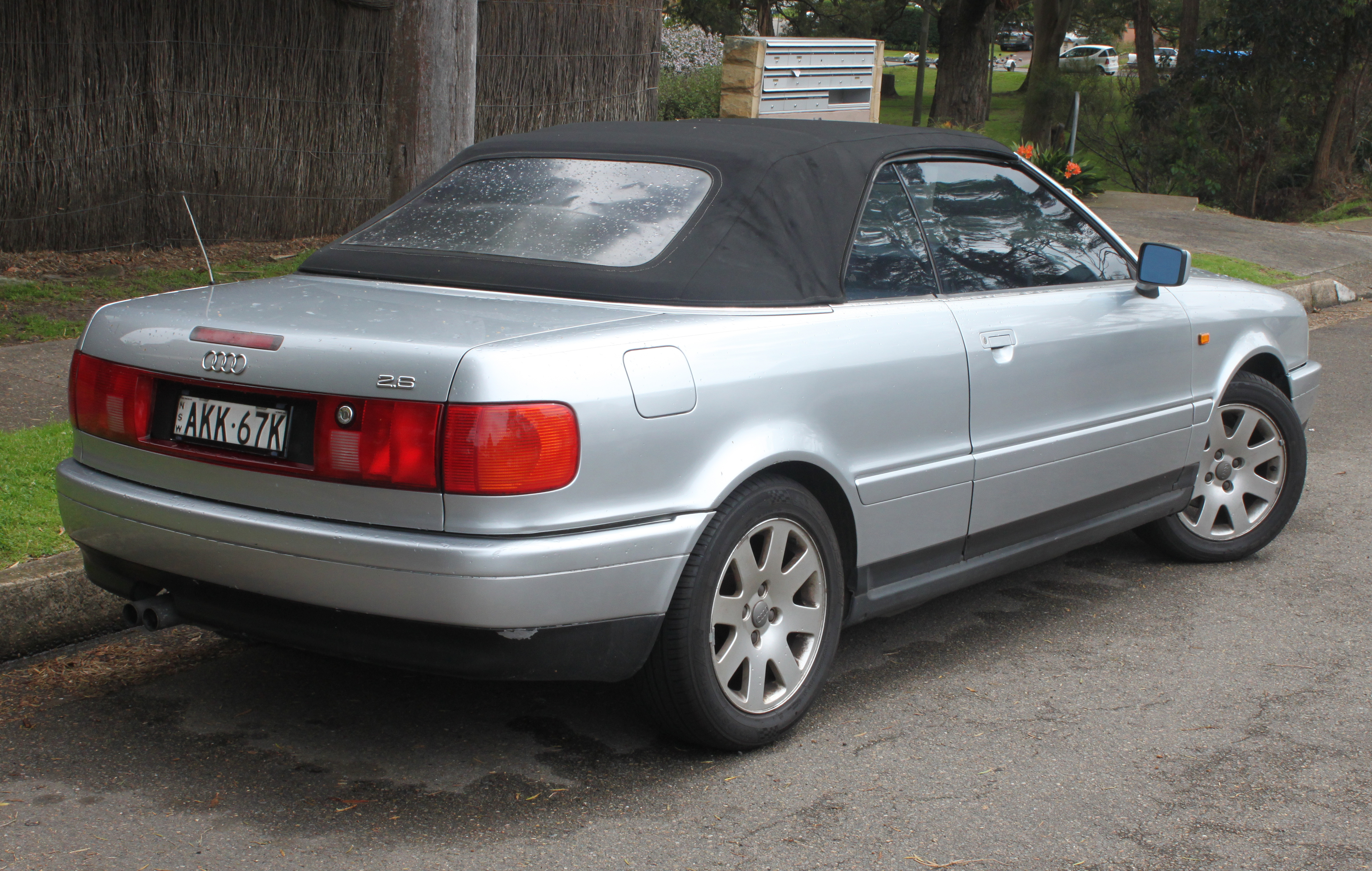
Rear view of 2.6 V6 facelift model (Australia)
