= Volkswagen Passat (B4) =

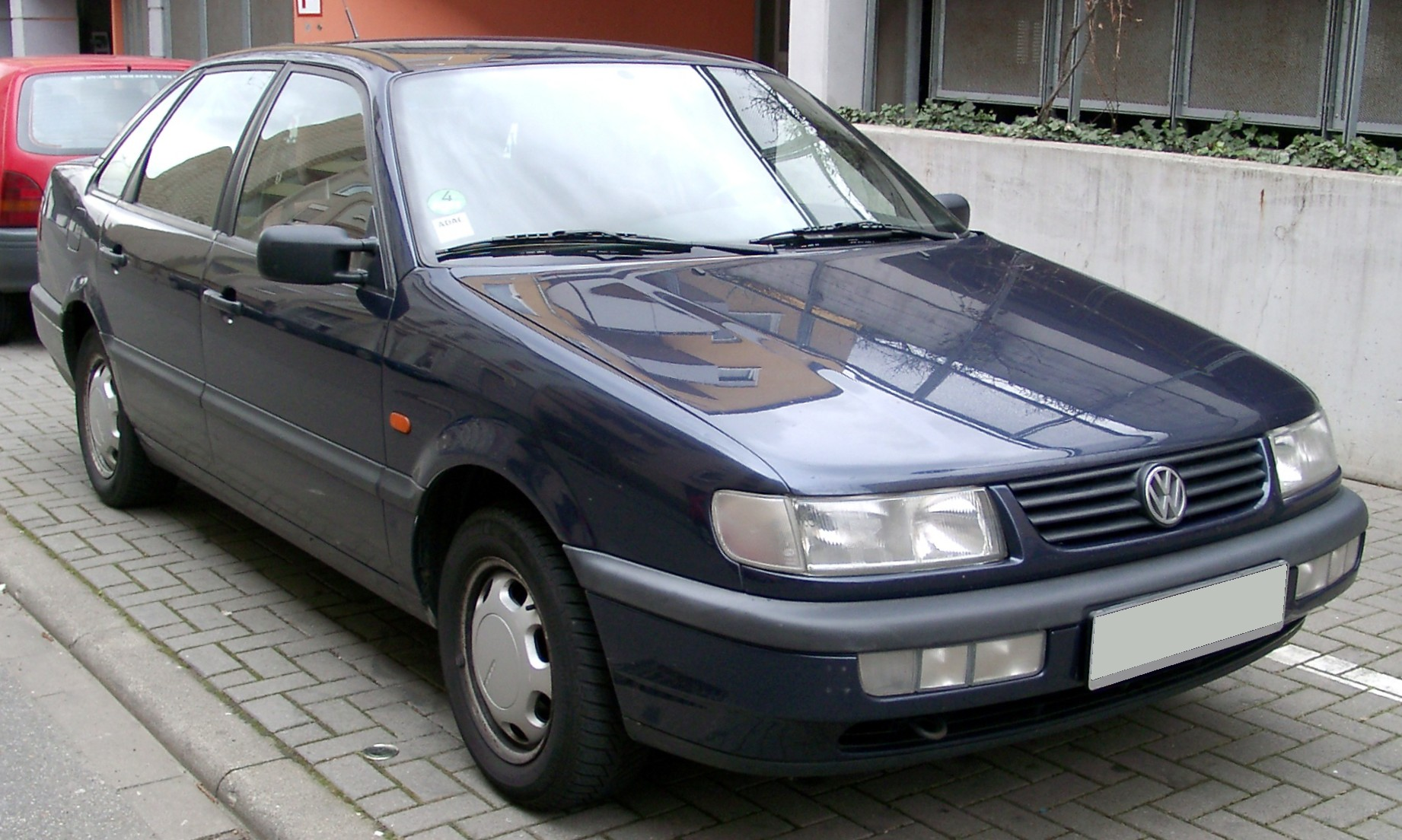

Overview
- Manufacturer: Volkswagen
- Production: October 1993–May 1997
- Assembly: Germany: Emden; Belgium: Volkswagen Vorst

Body and chassis
- Class: Mid-size car / Large family car (D)
- Body style: 4-door saloon/sedan 5-door estate/wagon
- Layout: Transverse Front engine, front-wheel drive or four-wheel drive
- Platform: Volkswagen Group B4
- Related: Volkswagen Passat (B3)

Powertrain
- Engine: Petrol engines: 1.6 L I4; 1.8 L I4; 2.0 L I4; 2.0 L I4 16v 2.8 L VR6; 2.9 L VR6; Diesel engines: 1.9 L TD I4; 1.9 L TDI I4
- Transmission: 4-speed automatic 5-speed manual

Dimensions
- Wheelbase: 103.3 in (2,624 mm)
- Length: 181.5 in (4,610 mm) (saloon); 181 in (4,597 mm) (estate)
- Width: 67.5 in (1,714 mm)
- Height: 56.4 in (1,433 mm) (saloon); 58.7 in (1,491 mm) (estate)

Chronology
- Predecessor: Volkswagen Passat (B3)
- Successor: Volkswagen Passat (B5)

The Volkswagen Passat (B4) is a large family car which was produced by German manufacturer Volkswagen from 1993 to 1997. Despite being designated B4, the car was not an all-new model, but instead a heavily facelifted B3 Passat. The facelift resulted in every external body panel being changed, except for the roof and glasshouse, with most obvious exterior change seeing the reintroduction of a grille to match the style of the other same-generation Volkswagen models of the era, such as the Mk3 Golf and Jetta. The interior was mildly updated and included safety equipment such as dual front airbags and seat belt pretensioners, although the basic dashboard design remained unchanged. The B4 sedan was replaced in 1996 by the new B5 Passat, which completely phased out the B4's production in 1997.

The car was available with a range of engines, including a Turbocharged Direct Injection (TDI) diesel engine - an inline four-cylinder 1.9 liter turbodiesel. It carried a U.S. EPA fuel efficiency rating for the sedan of 45 miles per US gallon (5.2 L/100 km; 54 mpg_{‑imp}) highway. Combined with a 70 L (15.4 imp gal; 18.5 US gal) fuel tank, it had a 1300+ km (800+ mi) range on a single tank of fuel. The B4 TDI wagon saw less than 1,000 sales in the U.S. during its 1996 to 1997 lifespan.

== B4 trim levels ==
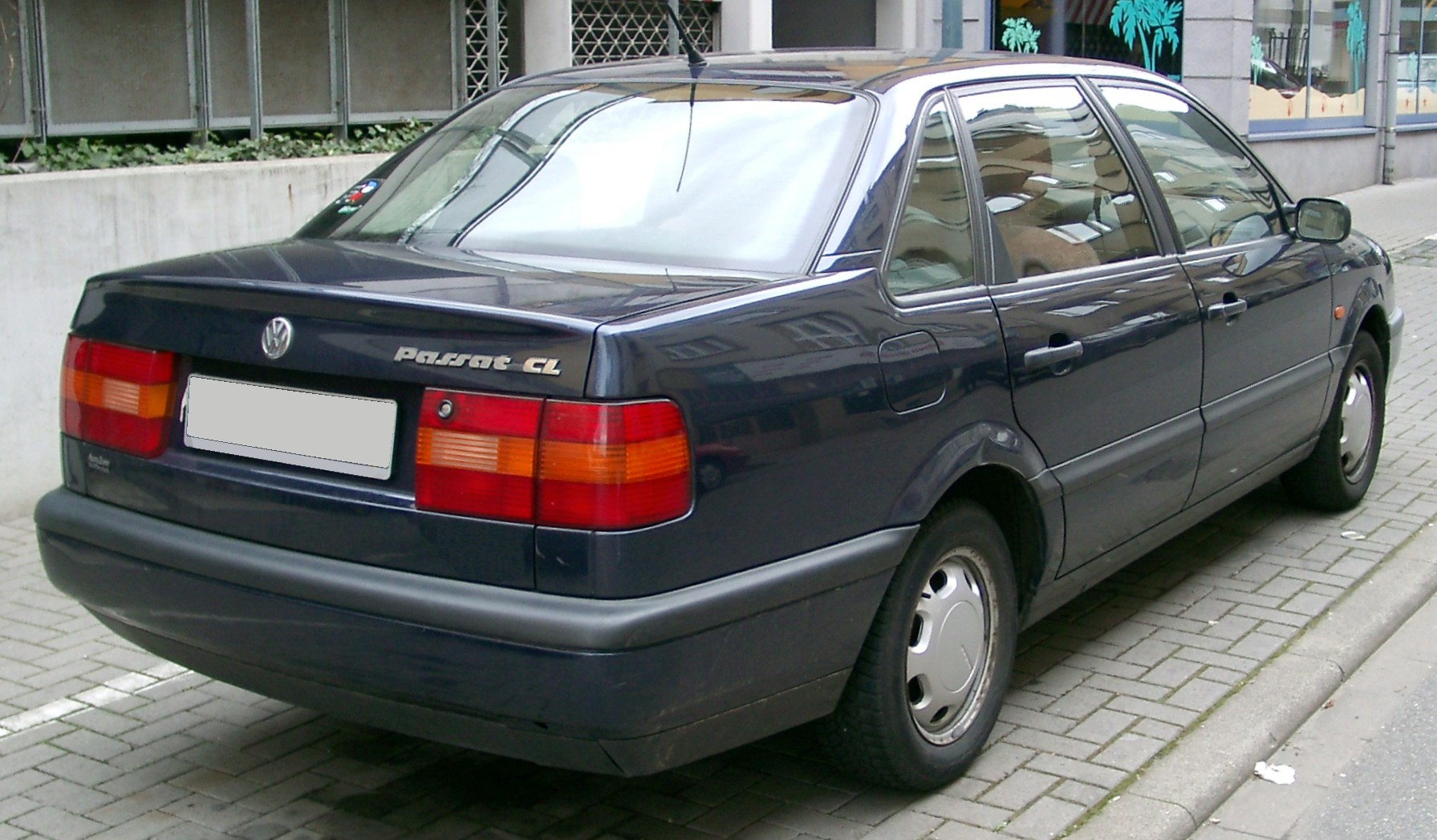
Sedan

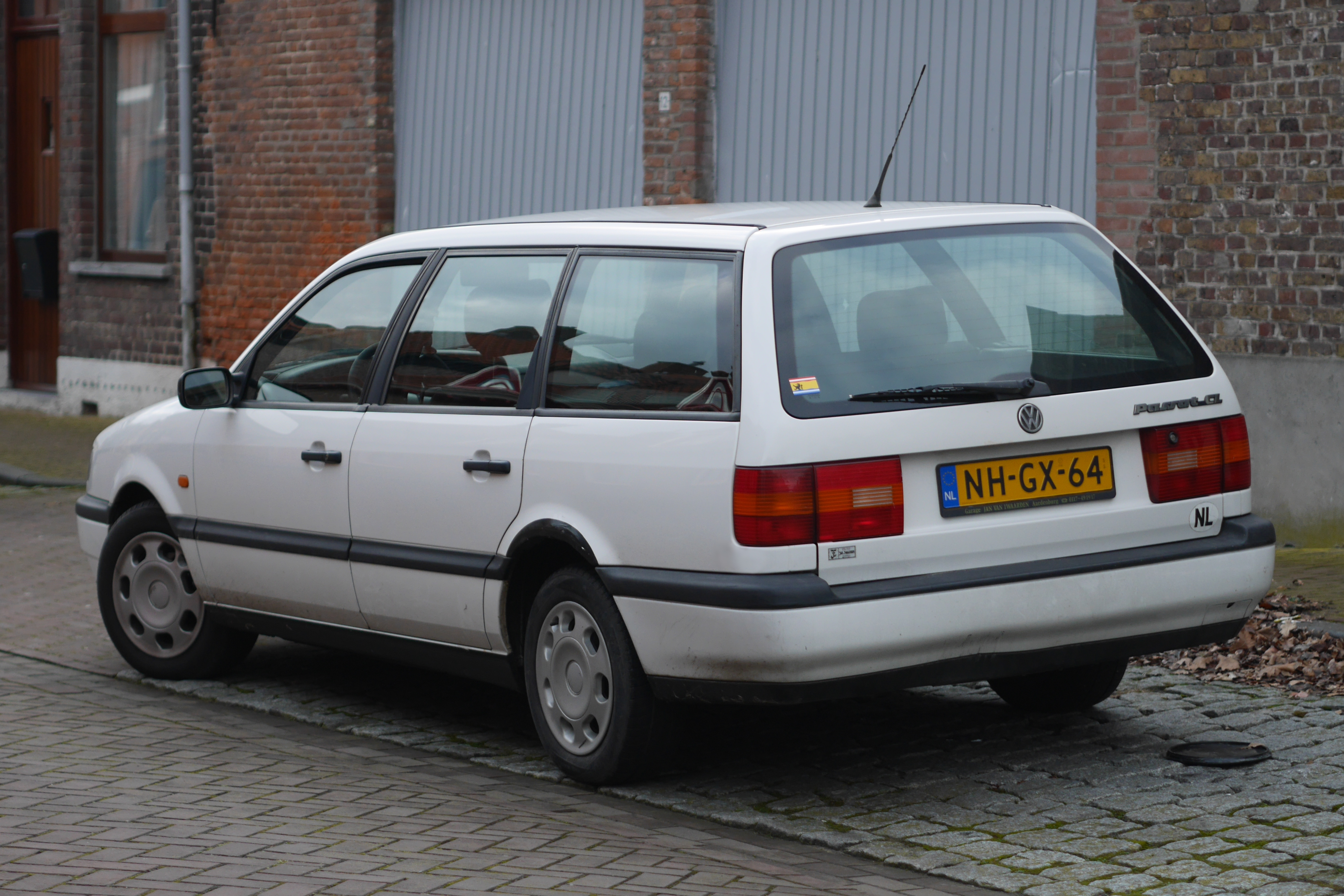
Variant

In Europe, L, CL, GL, and GT versions were available; most engines were offered in most trims. Only three trim levels were available in the United States, where the B4 was delayed until the 1995 model year: GLS, GLX, and TDI. The GLS had a 2.0-litre, SOHC 8-valve inline-four, while the TDI had the 1.9-litre turbodiesel. The GLX version carried Volkswagen's 2.8 litre VR6 engine, rated at 172 hp (128 kW). Motor Trend measured a 0-60 mph (97 km/h) time of 7.9 seconds for the 1993 Passat GLX.

Canadian versions of the Passat were similar to models sold in the U.S., but sales started for the 1994 model year. For 1994, only the VR6 was offered, being joined by the 2.0 in 1995. Unlike the U.S., Canadian models were also offered with the AAZ 1.9-liter turbodiesel for the 1995 model year. The 1.9-liter turbodiesel was replaced by the 1.9 TDI (1Z/AHU) in 1996.

The only version sold in Mexico was the 2.8-liter VR6 gasoline in GLX trim. These versions were more expensive than the Volkswagen cars built in Mexico, due to the import tariffs, and the fact the Passat was built in Germany.

== B4 engines ==
The following internal combustion engines were available in the B4 Passat:

Passat B4 petrol engines
Short Descr	VW Engine Code	Engine Type	Displacement	Power (Max Output)	Torque (Max Output)	Years	Top speed (km/h)
1.6	AEK	I4 SOHC 8V, multi-point fuel injection	1595 cc	101 PS (74 kW; 100 hp) @5800 rpm	135 N⋅m (100 lb⋅ft) @4400 rpm	1994–1995	186
1.6	AFT	I4 SOHC 8V, multi-point fuel injection	1595 cc	101 PS (74 kW; 100 hp) @5800 rpm	140 N⋅m (100 lb⋅ft) @3500 rpm	1995–1997	186
1.8	AAM / ANN	I4 SOHC 8V, single-point fuel injection	1781 cc	75 PS (55 kW; 74 hp) @5000 rpm	140 N⋅m (100 lb⋅ft) @2500 rpm	1993–1997	169
1.8	ABS / ADZ / ANP	I4 SOHC 8V, single-point fuel injection	1781 cc	90 PS (66 kW; 89 hp) @5400 rpm	145 N⋅m (107 lb⋅ft) @2500 rpm	1993–1997	178
2.0 & 2.0 Syncro (AWD)	2E / ADY / AGG	I4 SOHC 8V, multi-point fuel injection	1984 cc	115 PS (85 kW; 113 hp) @5400 rpm	166 N⋅m (122 lb⋅ft) @3200 rpm	1993–1997	195
2.0 16V	ABF	I4 DOHC 16V, multi-point fuel injection	1984 cc	150 PS (110 kW; 148 hp) @6000 rpm	180 N⋅m (130 lb⋅ft) @4800 rpm	1993–1997	213
2.8 VR6	AAA	VR6 SOHC 12V, multi-point fuel injection	2792 cc	174 PS (128 kW; 172 hp) @5800 rpm	235 N⋅m (173 lb⋅ft) @4200 rpm	1993–1997	224
2.9 VR6 & 2.9 VR6 Syncro (AWD)	ABV	VR6 DOHC 12V, multi-point fuel injection	2861 cc	184 PS (135 kW; 181 hp) @5800 rpm	245 N⋅m (181 lb⋅ft) @4200 rpm	1994–1997	218

Passat B4 diesel engines
Short Descr	VW Engine Code	Engine Type	Displacement	Power (Max Output)	Torque (Max Output)	Years	Top speed (km/h)
1.9 TD	AAZ	I4 SOHC 8V, indirect injection and turbocharger	1896 cc	75 PS (55 kW; 74 hp) @4400 rpm	150 N⋅m (110 lb⋅ft) @2400 rpm	1993–1996	165
1.9 TDI	1Z / AHU	I4 SOHC 8V, Turbocharged Direct Injection	1896 cc	90 PS (66 kW; 89 hp) @4000 rpm	202 N⋅m (149 lb⋅ft) @1900 rpm	1993–1997	178
1.9 TDI	AFN	I4 SOHC 8V, Turbocharged Direct Injection	1896 cc	110 PS (81 kW; 108 hp) @4150 rpm	235 N⋅m (173 lb⋅ft) @1900 rpm	1996–1997	193
