= Volkswagen Group B platform =

Overview
- Manufacturer: Volkswagen Group
- Production: 1972–2013

Body and chassis
- Class: Mid-size/large family car (D); Compact executive car (D)
- Layout: Longitudinally mounted front-engine, front-wheel-drive; Longitudinally mounted front-engine, all-wheel-drive

Chronology
- Predecessor: Audi F103
- Successor: Volkswagen Group MLB platform

The Volkswagen Group B platform is a mid-size automobile platform from the Volkswagen Group. It has been used for saloon cars/sedans, estate cars/station wagon, and coupés - under the Volkswagen Passenger Cars, Audi, SEAT and Škoda marques.

Volkswagen Group revised the alphanumeric nomenclature used for car platforms. The revised platform code is composed as follows:

- A letter, P, indicating a passenger car platform
- A letter indicating the configuration of the engine:
  - Q indicates a transverse engine (Quer in German)
  - L indicates a longitudinal engine (Längs in German)
- A digit indicating the platform size or class:
  - 4 corresponds to mid-size cars
- A digit indicating the generation or evolution

An additional + suffix indicates a long-wheelbase variant.

== B1 ==
1974–1988. An Audi derived platform, the first Volkswagen Passat was nearly identical to the Audi 80 (Audi Fox in US), sharing much of its mechanical systems, including its longitudinal engine placement.

- VW Passat B1/VW Dasher (Typ 32, 1974–1981; 1974–1988 in Brazil)
- Audi 80 (Typ 80, 1973–1976)
- Audi 80 (Typ 82, 1977–1978)

== BX ==
1980–1996. The BX platform, developed by Volkswagen's Brazilian subsidiary (Volkswagen do Brasil), again borrowed heavily from the Audi 80 (Fox/4000) of the day. The BX platform was used for the Brazilian Volkswagen Gol (hatchback), Voyage (sedan, also sold as the Gacel or Senda in Argentina, Fox in the US, or Amazon in some other markets), Parati (3-door wagon/estate), Saveiro (pickup) and Furgão (van) models. The BX platform was quite unique in that it started life with a four-cylinder Volkswagen air-cooled engine (borrowed from the Volkswagen Beetle), and eventually ended up with a more modern water-cooled engine, being sold in the US for the first time as a 1987 model. The VW BX family was restyled in 1987 and 1991.

== B2 ==
Still an Audi derived platform, this time based on the Audi 80/4000, again, including its longitudinal engine placement and, on some European models, the quattro four-wheel drive system, rebranded Syncro for Volkswagen cars. The Santana (facelifted) was produced until January 2013 in China.

- Volkswagen Passat (B2) (Typ 32B, 1981–1988; 1984–2013 in China; 1982–1988 in the US where it was sold as the Quantum)
- Audi 80/90 (Typ 81, 1979–1987)
- Audi 4000 (Typ 85, 1984–1987)
- Audi Coupé (Typ 85, 1981–1987)
- Audi Quattro (Typ 85, 1981–1991)
- Audi Sport Quattro (1984–1987)
- Volkswagen Santana (Typ 33, 1984–2006)

== B3 ==
The B3 designation is used to refer to both the third generation Volkswagen Passat produced from 1988-1993, and the "Typ 89" version of the Audi 80/90 produced from 1987 to 1992 and the "Typ 8B" Audi Coupé and S2, which are based on different platforms. The B3 Passat switched to a transverse engine layout while the Audi 80/90 continued to use a longitudinal engine layout.

The B3 Volkswagen Passat was the first B platform car to be called Passat in the United States. The B3 was also the first Passat with an independently designed platform, which did not share parts with Audi models. Instead, the design borrowed heavily from the Volkswagen Group A2 platform, being essentially a stretched version of it, and sharing the same transverse engine layout.

- Volkswagen Passat B3 (Typ 35i, 1988–1993; 1990–1994 in US)

The Volkswagen Corrado was an A2 platform car, but it borrowed heavily from the B3 Passat platform for ancillary components (the VR6 version borrowed some suspension components from the A3 platform too).

== B4 ==
As with B3, the B4 designation is used to refer to the "Typ 8C" version of the Audi 80 and RS2 produced from 1991 to 1994, as well as the Volkswagen Passat B4, however they are not based on the same platform.

The longitudinal engine B4 vehicles were developed from the longitudinal B3 platform, with some modifications such as an extended rear overhang, longer wheelbase, redesigned suspension, and fuel tank.

The B4 Passat was a face lifted B3 (receiving its own generation number is controversial), remaining nearly mechanically identical, but with entirely new sheetmetal, and an updated interior design.

- Volkswagen Passat B4 (Typ 35i, 1993–1996; U.S. 1995–1997)

== B5 (PL45) ==
The B5 platform (also known as PL45 under Volkswagen's revised naming scheme) returned to a longitudinal engine layout. This platform was introduced with the first-generation Audi A4 and the 1996 Volkswagen Passat. B5 platform cars can be equipped with a multilink front suspension and a Torsen centre differential for quattro or 4motion branded four-wheel drive systems. A long-wheelbase derivative of this platform - originally designed for the Chinese market and being used in the 1999 Volkswagen Passat Lingyu, but ultimately being used for its rebadged version under the Škoda brand, the 2002 Škoda Superb - is referred to as PL45+.

In late 2000, the B5 Passat received a facelift, and is referred to as the "B5.5" generation.

=== PL45 ===
- Audi A4 (Typ 8D, Avant 8D5, 1994–2002)
- Audi S4 (Typ 8D, 1997–2002)
- Volkswagen Passat B5 (Typ 3B, 1996–2000)
- Audi RS4 Avant (Typ 8D, 2000–2001)
- Volkswagen Passat B5.5 (Typ 3BG, 2000–2005)

=== PL45+ ===
- Volkswagen Passat Lingyu B5 (Typ 9F, 2005–2011; long-wheelbase version for Chinese market)
- Škoda Superb (Typ 3U, 2001–2008)

== B6 (PL46/PQ46) ==
The B6 designation is used to refer to two different vehicle platforms, the longitudinal engine PL46 platform used by Audi, and the transverse engine PQ46 platform used by the remainder of the group. The PQ46 platform was derived from the PQ35 platform used by the Golf Mk5 and Jetta Mk5s. The PQ46 platform was primarily intended for larger vehicles, such as mid-size cars and crossovers.

=== PL46 ===
- Audi A4 (Typ 8E/8H (saloon: 8E2, Avant: 8E5) / 8H7 (Cabriolet), 2001–2005)
- Audi S4 (Typ 8E/8H (saloon: 8E2, Avant: 8E5) / 8H7 (Cabriolet), 2003–2005)

=== PQ46 ===
- Škoda Superb (3T)
- Volkswagen CC (3C/35)
- Volkswagen Passat B6 & B7 (3C)
- Volkswagen Passat NMS (A32/A33)
- Volkswagen Sharan Mk2 (7N)
- SEAT Alhambra Mk2 (7N)
- Volkswagen Tiguan Mk1 (5N)
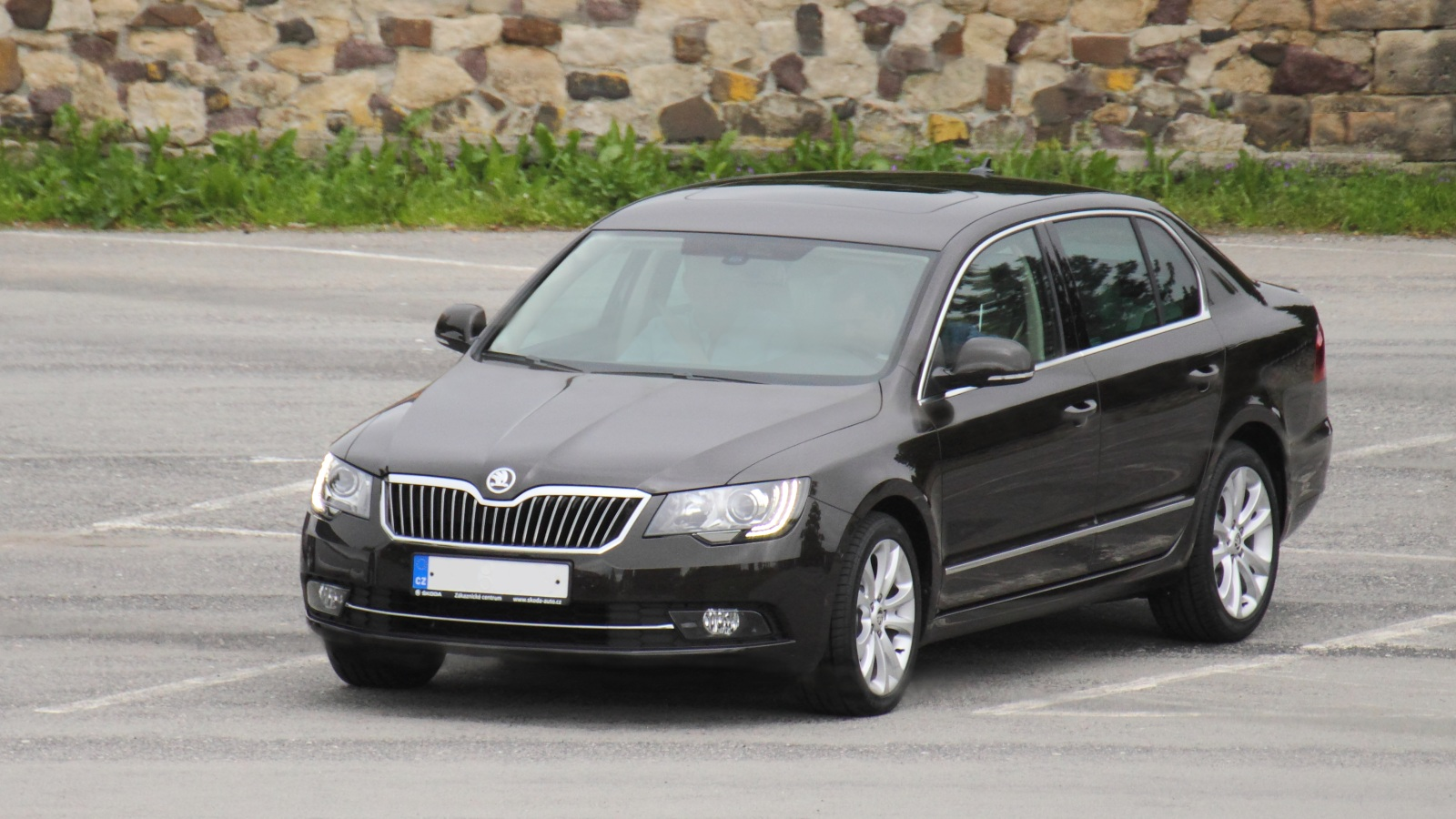
Škoda Superb

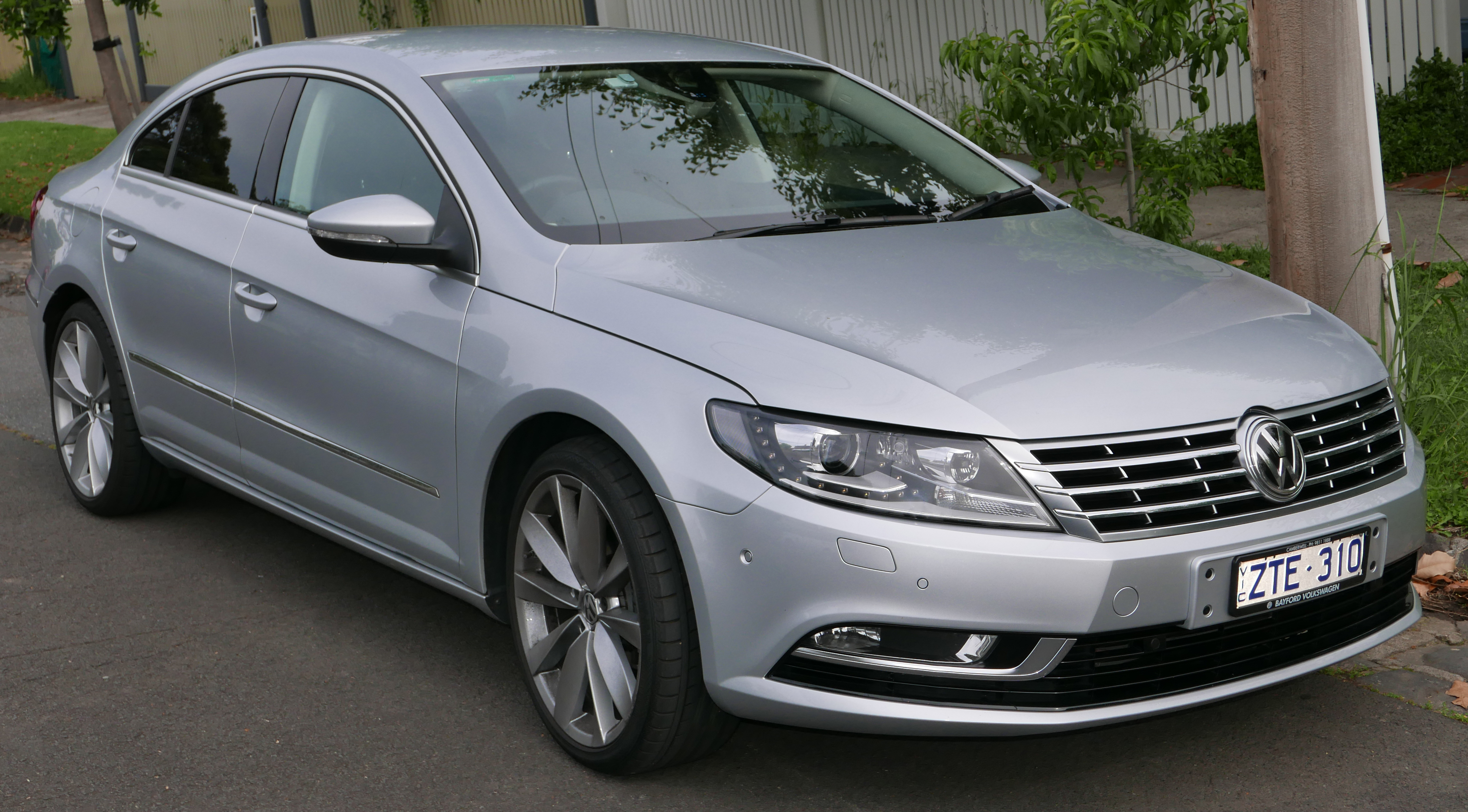
Volkswagen CC

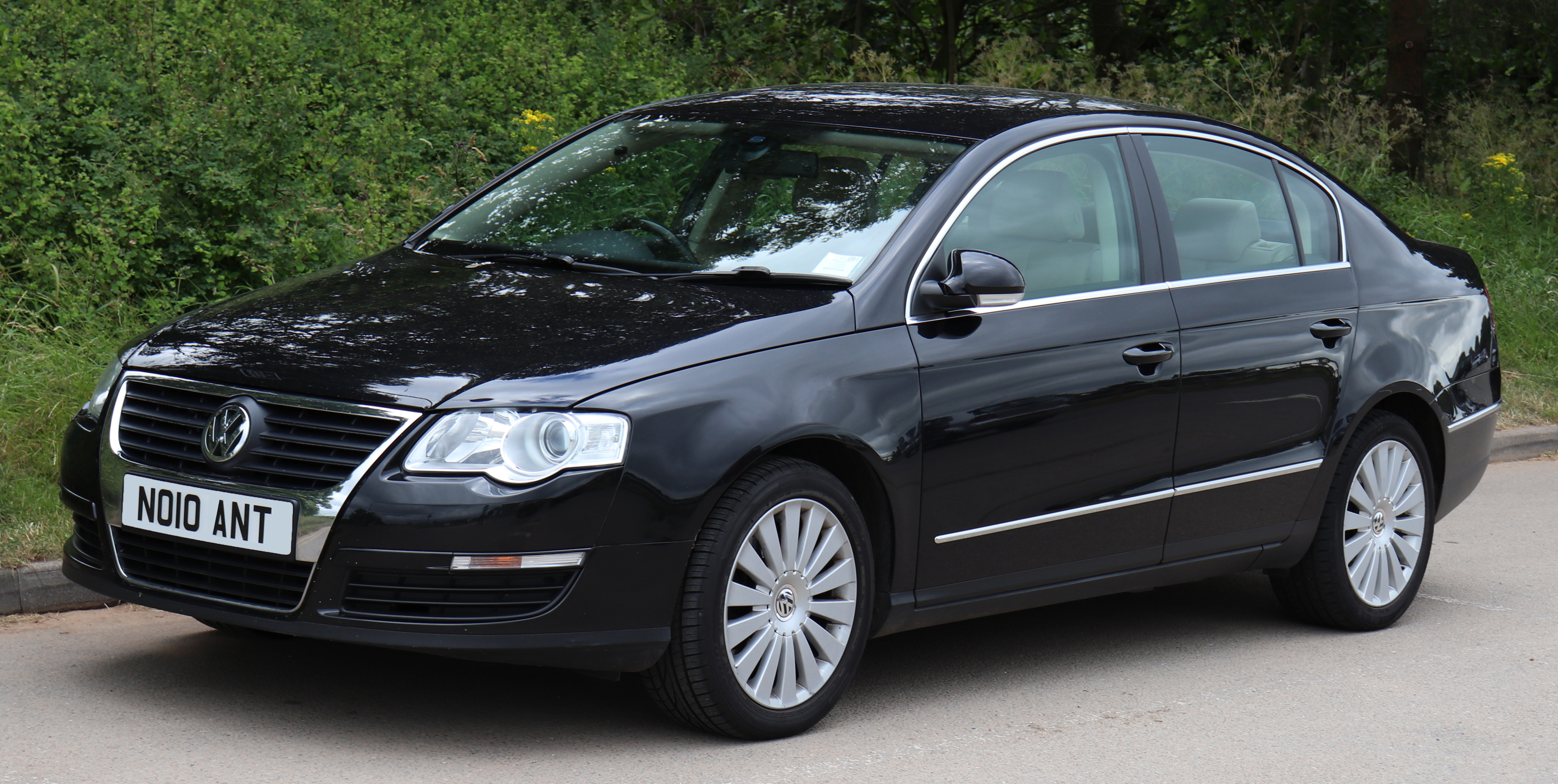
Volkswagen Passat (B6)

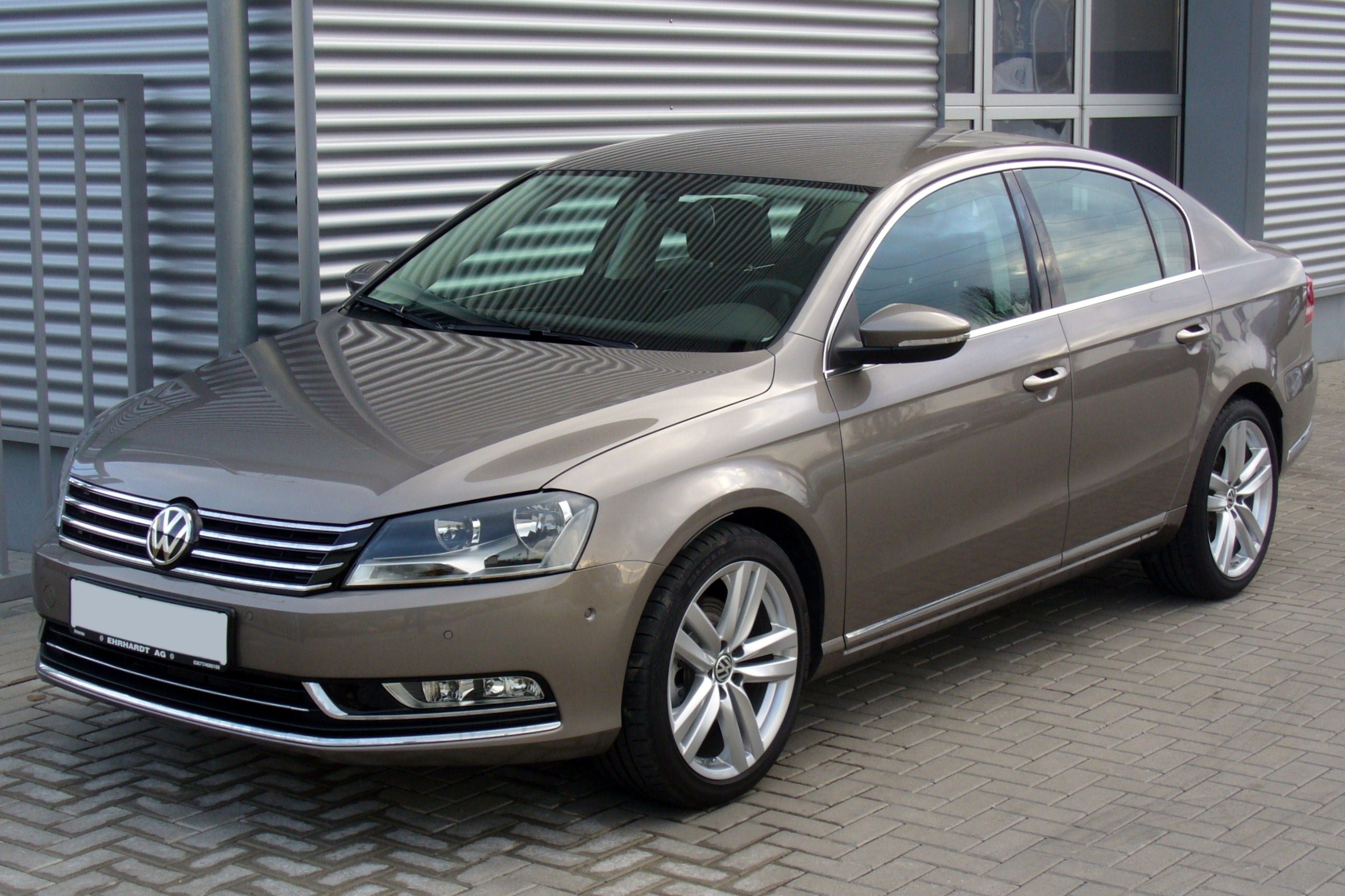
Volkswagen Passat (B7)

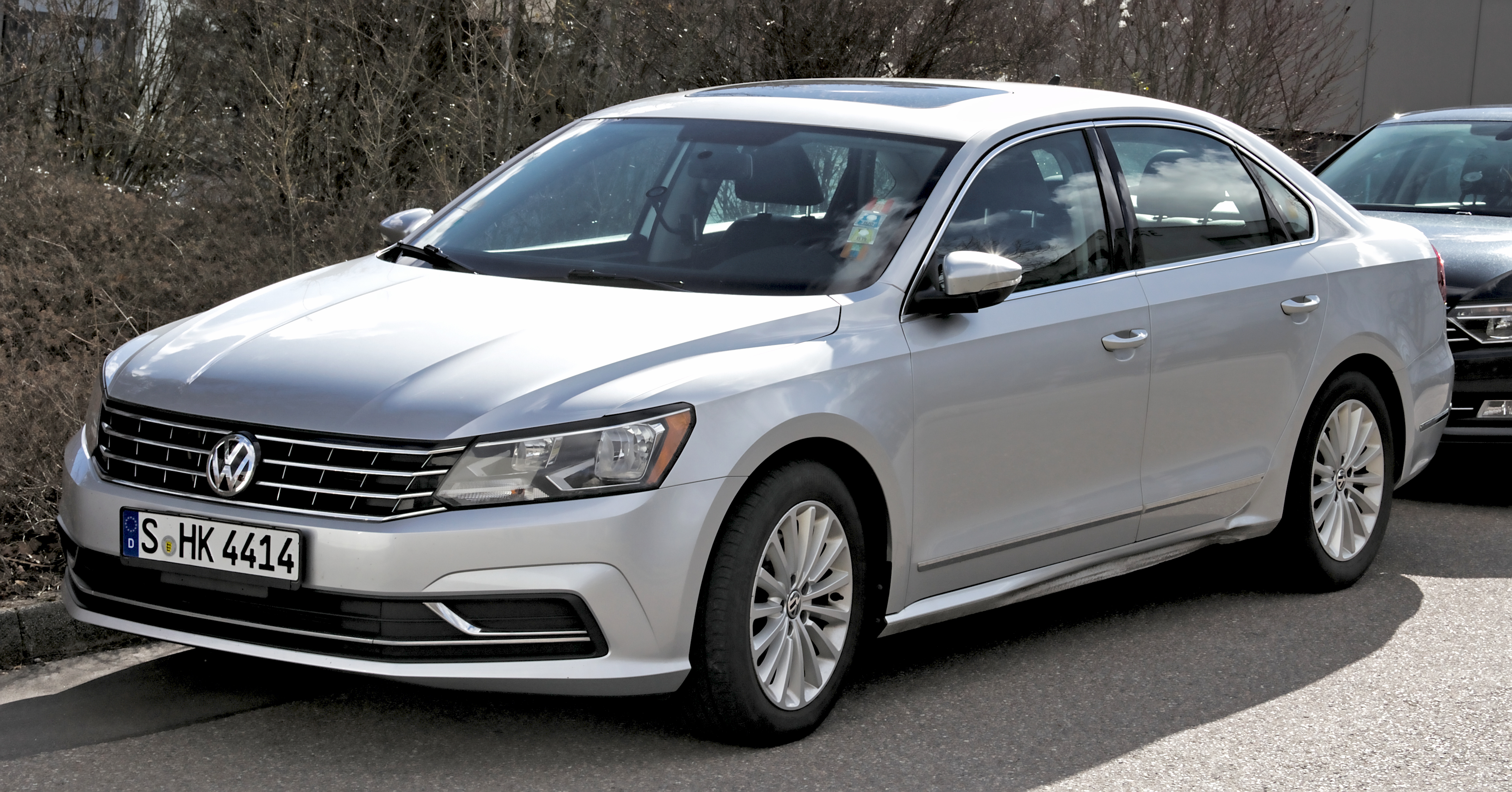
Volkswagen Passat NMS

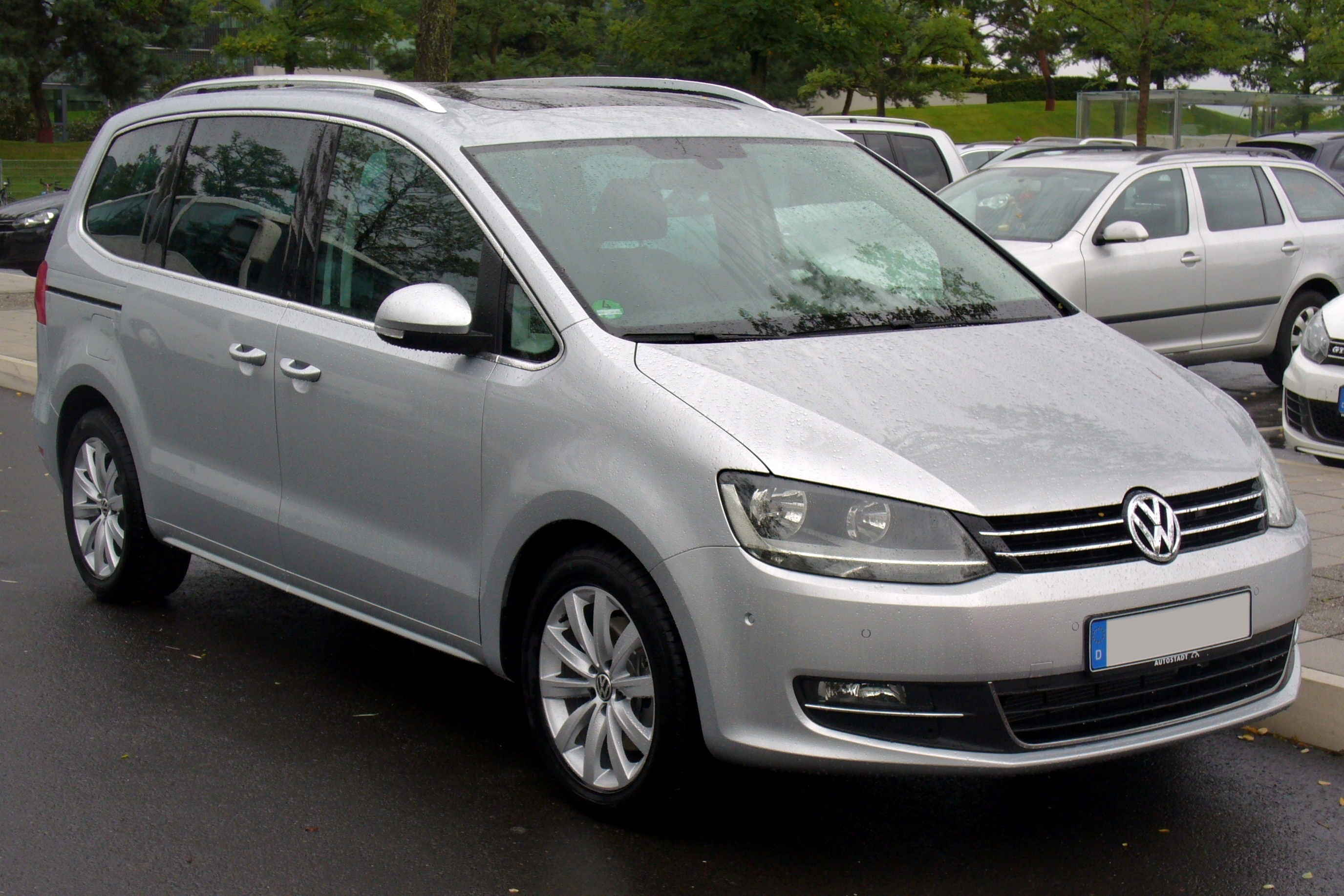
Volkswagen Sharan Mk2

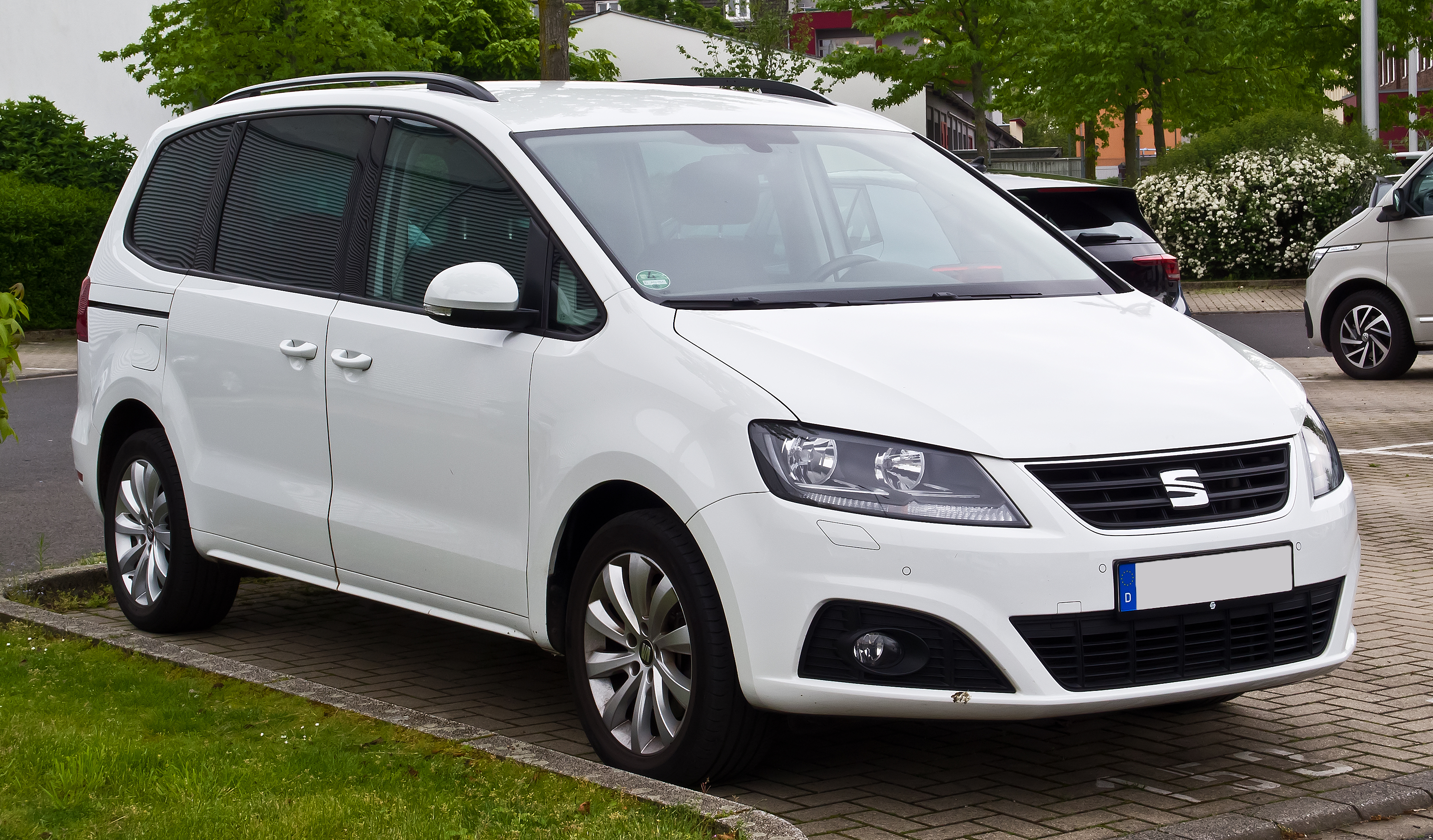
SEAT Alhambra Mk2

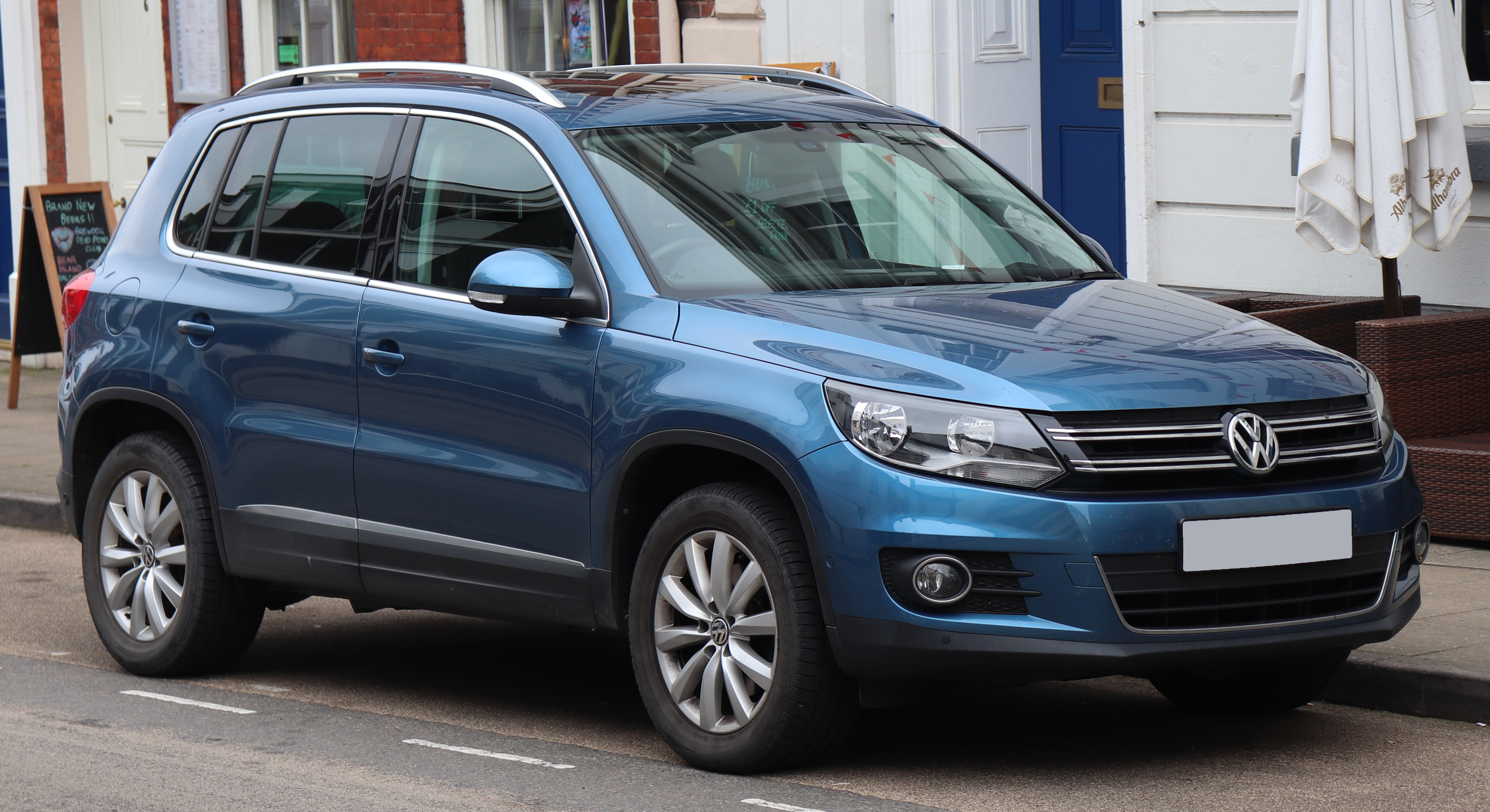
Volkswagen Tiguan Mk1

== B7 (PL47) ==
The designation B7 is used to identify the "Typ 8E/8H" Audi A4, S4, and RS4 produced from 2005 to 2008. The B7 A4/S4 retains the Typ 8E/8H numbers of the B6 A4/S4 with different suffixes, while the SEAT Exeo (which was derived from the B7 A4) takes the Typ 3R number.

- Audi A4 (Typ 8E2 (saloon), 8E5 (Avant), 8H7 (Cabriolet), 2005–2008**)
- Audi S4 (Typ 8E2 (saloon), 8E5 (Avant), 8H7 (Cabriolet), 2006–2008)
- Audi RS4 quattro (Typ 8E2 (saloon), 8E5 (Avant), 8H7 (Cabriolet), 2006–2008)
- SEAT Exeo (Typ 3R5 (saloon), 3R9 (Sport Tourer), 2009–2013)

**Audi 2009 Cabriolet was a carry-over from the 2008 model year

== MLB (B8/B9) ==
The MLB platform (Modularer Längsbaukasten, translating from German to "Modular Longitudinal Toolkit" or "Modular Longitudinal Matrix") is used in the B8 (A4, A5, Q5), C7 (A6, A7, Q7) and D4 (A8) families of Audi vehicles. The design is noteworthy for placing the front differential ahead of the clutch, allowing the front axle to be moved forward 4 inches. This results in an increase in wheelbase and a slightly more rearward weight distribution for better vehicle dynamics.
