= Volkswagen Passat (B3) =

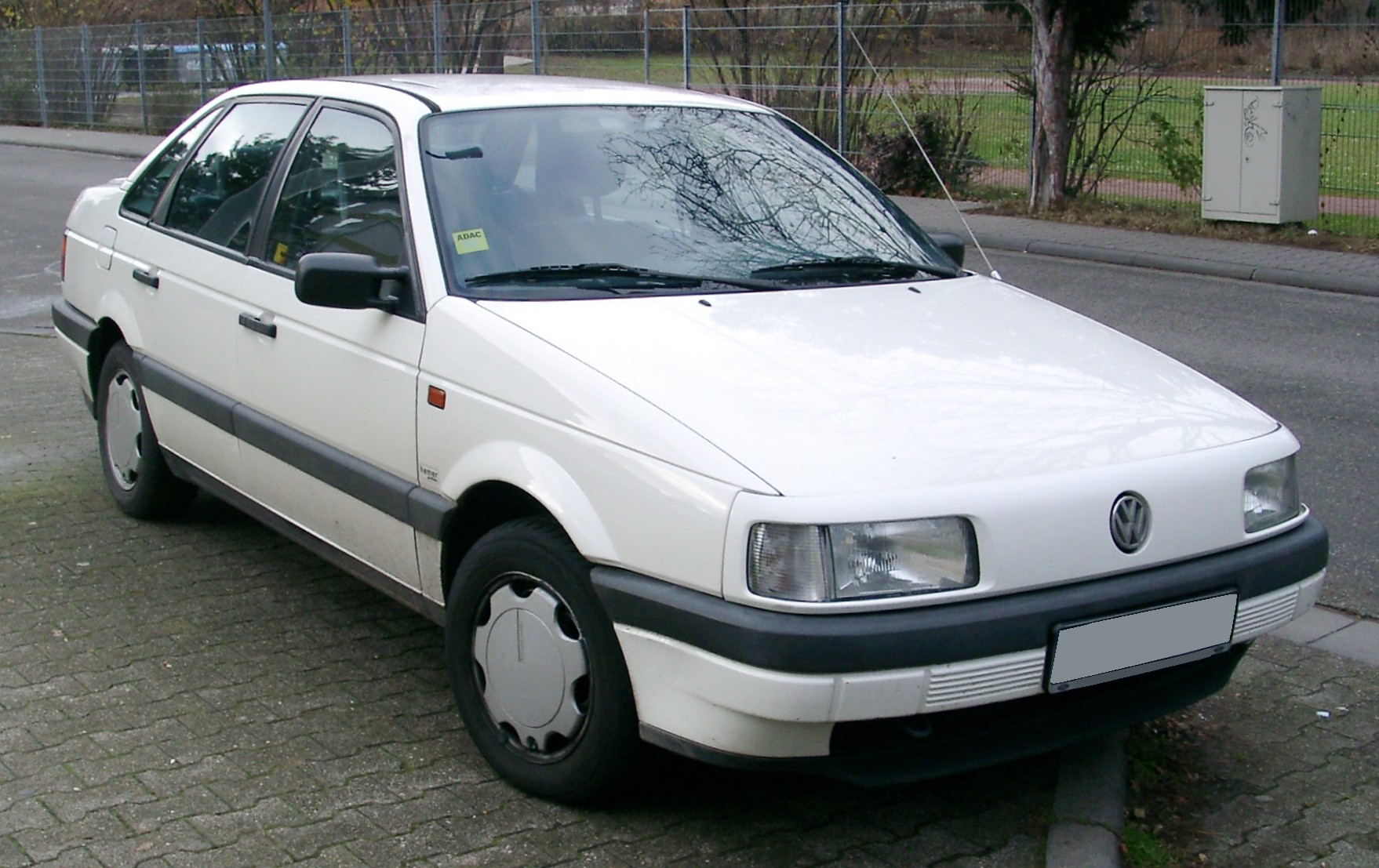

Overview
- Also called: Volkswagen Passat B3
- Production: 1988–1993
- Assembly: Germany: Emden; Slovakia: Bratislava (VWBA)
- Designer: Herbert Schäfer

Body and chassis
- Class: Large family car (D); Mid-size car
- Body style: 4-door saloon/sedan; 5-door estate/wagon
- Layout: Transverse front engine, with front-wheel or four-wheel drive (syncro)
- Platform: Volkswagen Group B3

Powertrain
- Engine: Petrol engine: 1.6 L EZ/RF/1F/ABN I4; 1.8 L PB/PF/RP/AAM/ABS I4; 1.8 L KR 16V I4; 1.8 L PG G-Lader I4; 2.0 L 2E I4; 2.0 L 9A 16V I4; 2.8 L AAA VR6; Diesel engine: 1.6 L RA/SB turbo I4; 1.9 L 1Y I4; 1.9 L AAZ turbo I4
- Transmission: Four-speed automatic; Five-speed manual

Dimensions
- Wheelbase: Front-wheel drive: 2,625 mm (103.3 in); Syncro (four-wheel drive): 2,630 mm (103.5 in)
- Length: 4,575 mm (180.1 in)
- Width: 1,705 mm (67.1 in)
- Height: 1,430–1,500 mm (56.3–59.1 in)

Chronology
- Predecessor: Volkswagen Passat (B2)
- Successor: Volkswagen Passat (B4)

The third-generation Volkswagen Passat, known as Volkswagen Passat B3 or Volkswagen Passat 35i, is a large family car which was produced by German manufacturer Volkswagen from 1988 to 1993. It was introduced in March 1988 in Europe, 1989 in North America, and 1995 in South America; it was also briefly available in Australia in 1991, when a total of 14 Passat GL 16V in sedan and wagon versions were sold by then importer TKM. Unlike the previous two generations of the Passat, the B3 was not available as a fastback - only 4-door sedan and 5-door station wagon versions were available, setting the precedent for the model for all subsequent generations to date. Its curvy looks were a contrast from the boxy appearance of its predecessor and owed much to the "jelly mould" style pioneered by Ford with the Sierra and Taurus. The lack of a grille, utilizing the bottom breather approach, made the car's front end styling reminiscent of older, rear-engined Volkswagens such as the 411, and also doubled as a modern styling trend. The styling was developed from the 1981 aerodynamic (c_{d} = 0.25) Auto 2000 concept car.

== Design ==
At the time it was the first Passat to be built on a Volkswagen-designed platform, rather than sharing one with an Audi saloon. The Passat B3 was designed by Volkswagen's design chief, Herbert Schäfer and, unlike equivalent Audi models, now featured a space-saving transversely mounted engine (a configuration from which future Passat models would retreat in 1996). A couple of weeks ahead of launch, press reports appeared that the forthcoming new Passat was known within the company as the first "true Hahn model" ("erster echter Hahn"), even though Carl Hahn junior had by this time already been the Volkswagen Group's chairman since 1982. The message, reflecting management priorities at the time, was that whereas recent new models from Volkswagen had unapologetically appeared to be rebadged and mildly rebodied Audis, with this model Volkswagen under Hahn now had the confidence to reassert a more distinctive identity for its cars, differentiating the Audi and Volkswagen brands more persuasively from one another in the process.

The car, although designated B3 in Volkswagen's platform nomenclature, was based largely on the A platform as used for the smaller Golf Mk2 model, but was stretched in all directions. Many components are shared directly between these vehicles. It was marketed under the Passat name in all markets; in North America, this was a first.

As somewhat rare features for the time, the B3 Passat was optionally offered with rear self-levelling air suspension, and electronically regulated air conditioning (called "Climatronic"). These two options were available only in Europe.

=== Drivetrain ===
The fuel injected petrol engines gave better performance and refinement than the previously used carbureted units. They were mounted transversely, and the floorpan was engineered to accept Volkswagen's "Syncro" four-wheel drive system. Mostly installed in the Passat Variant (station wagon), the Syncro used a viscous coupling and flexible partition of torque to send power to the rear axle when required.

Engine options in Europe started with the 1.6-litre petrol four, followed by the 1.8-litre eight-valve and 16-valve engines and the G60 version of the same. the G60 arrived late in 1989, around the same time that an eight-valve version of the 2.0-litre petrol four was added; originally, the 2.0 had only been offered in a sixteen-valve version. Volkswagen's new 2.8-litre VR6 engine arrived in the GL/GT versions in April 1991; this was the first car to receive this all-new development. The VR6 engine gave the top-of-the-range Passat a top speed of 224 km/h (139 mph). At the time of introduction, the only diesel option was the company's 1.6-litre, intercooled turbodiesel, but in mid-1989 a naturally aspirated 1.9-litre version was added, followed by a turbocharged version of the same in April 1991.

Going on sale in North America for the 1990 model year, the Passat originally only came in a single GL model, powered by the 2.0 16v producing 134 hp (100 kW). For 1992 a lower-priced CL model (with the same engine) was added, only with the sedan bodywork. The CL only lasted a single year in the United States, instead a better equipped, four-cylinder GLS model (sedan only) was added in 1993 while the GLX model received the new VR6 engine. In Canada, the VR6 was called the GLS, while the 2.0 remained available as a CL or GL. After 1993 the four-cylinder versions were discontinued, but the 2.8 GLX remained available in the United States market for the 1994 model year. Canadians were also offered the 1.8-litre G60 engine (only Syncro-equipped, around 200 examples were sold) for 1992 and 1993, and the 1.9-litre turbo-diesel with 75 hp (56 kW) for 1993, the B3's last year in Canada.

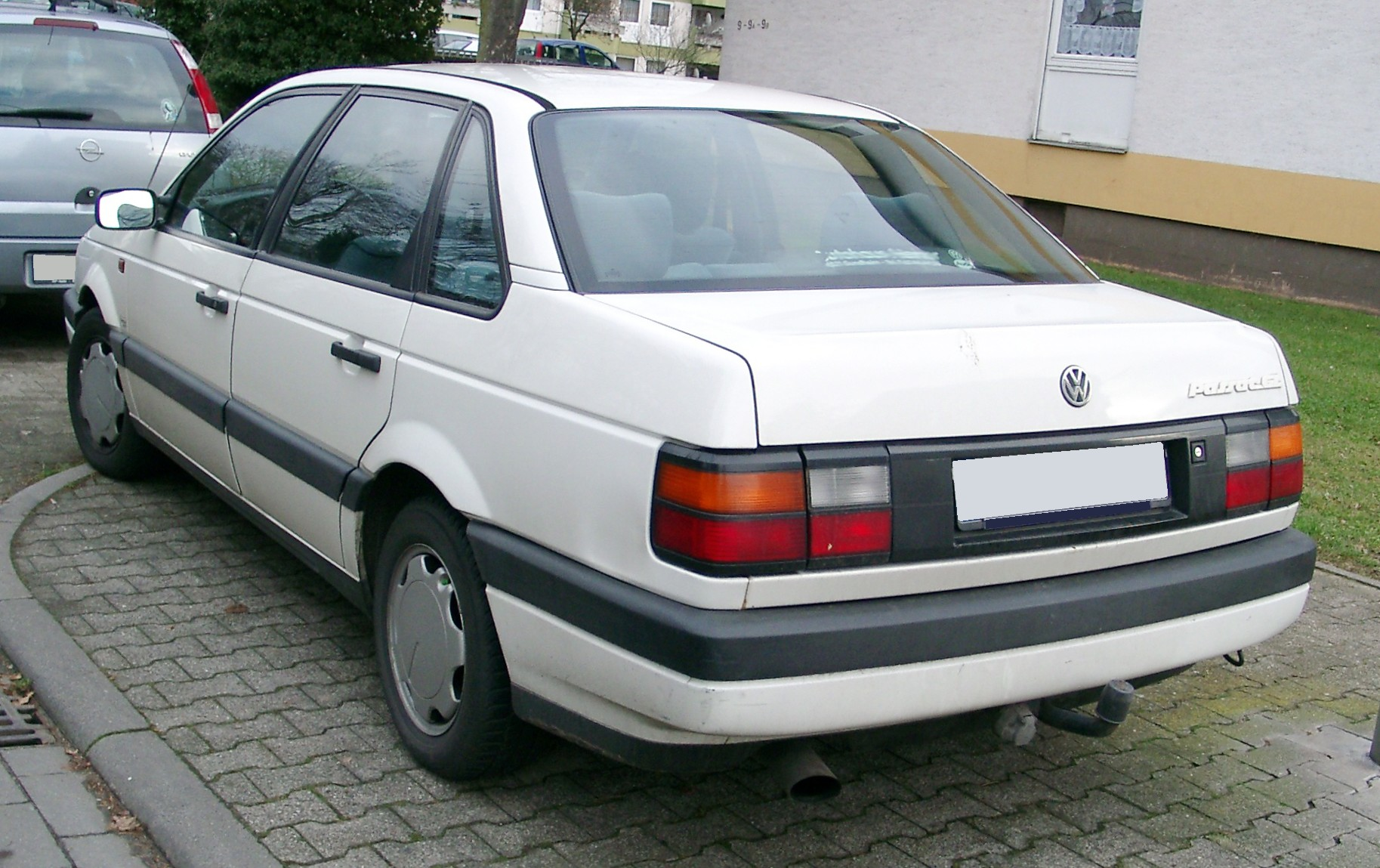
Sedan; rear view

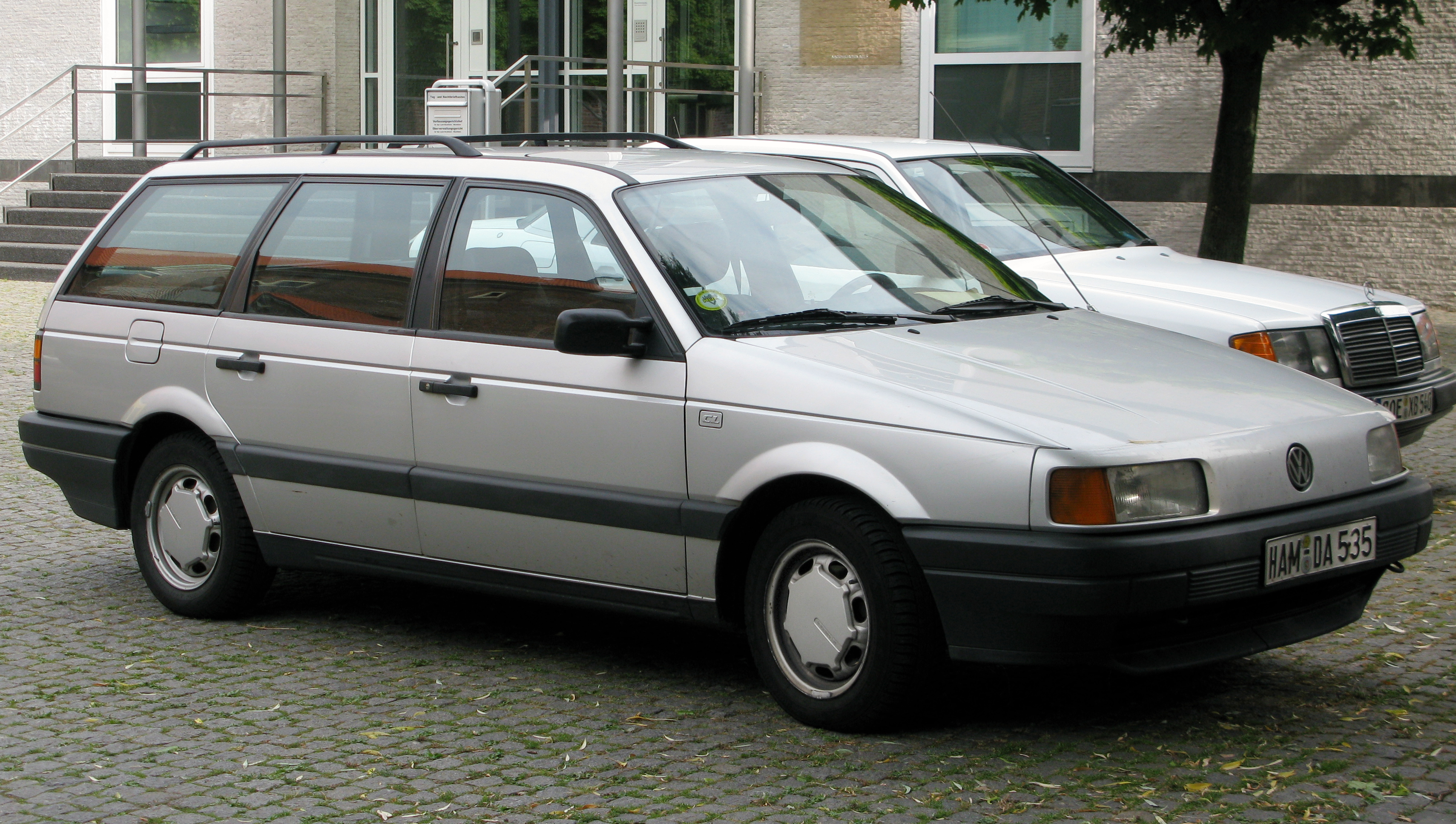
Variant (wagon)

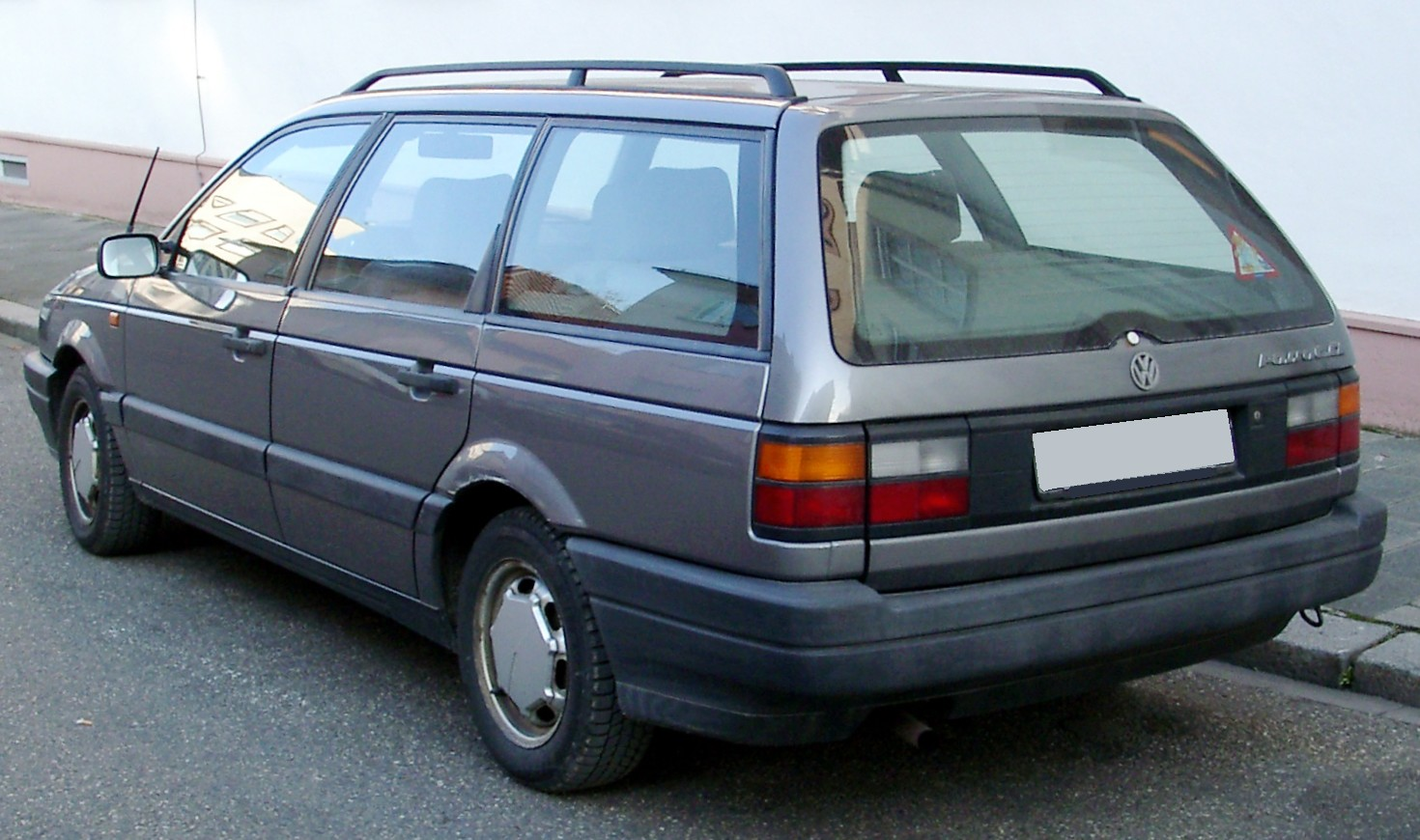
Variant; rear view

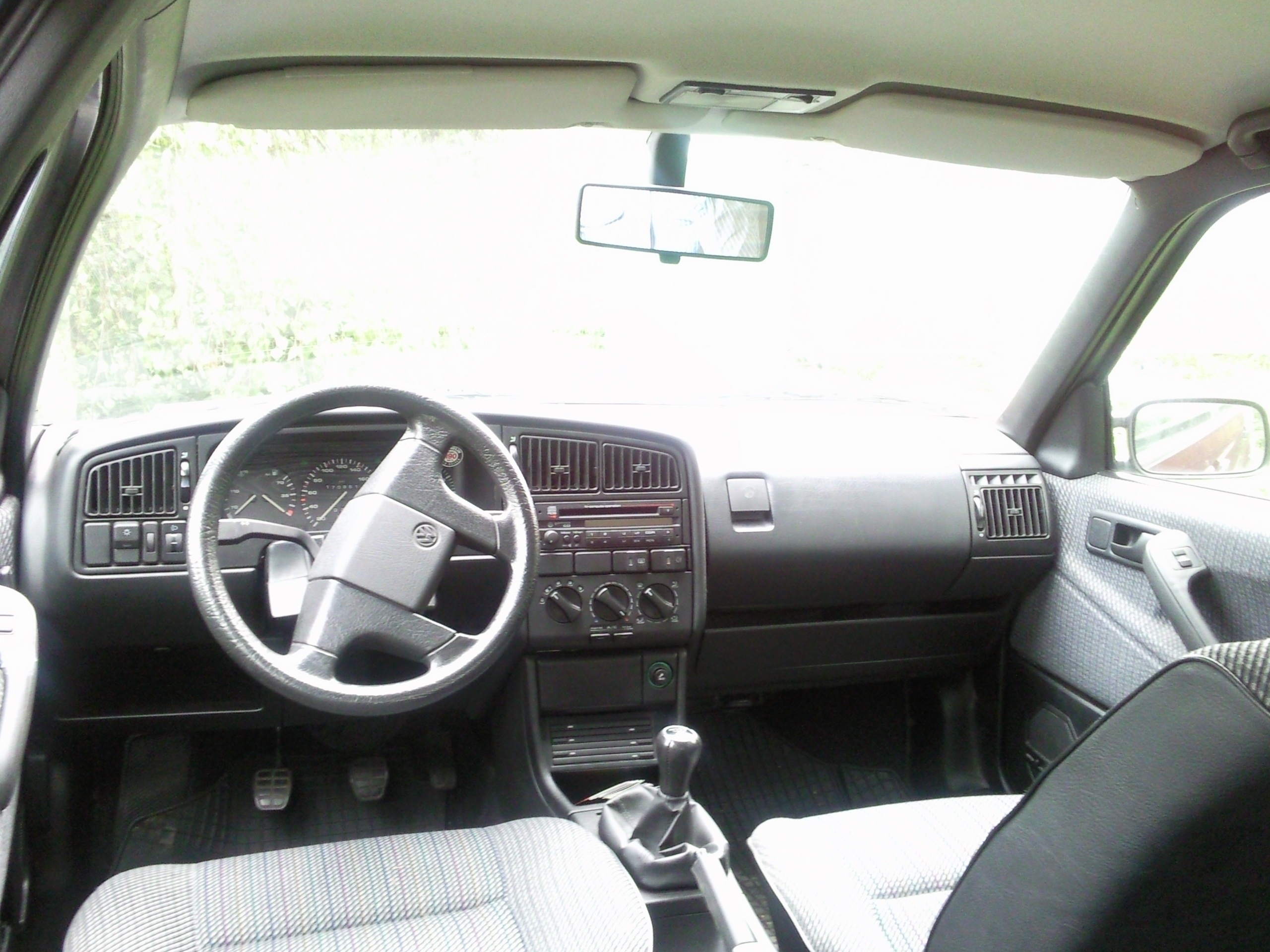
Interior

== Technical Data ==
Model	Production period	Engine type	Valve control	Fuel mixture formation	Forced induction	Engine code	Displacement, bore x stroke	C.R.	max. Power	max. Torque	Drive	Gearbox	Top Speed	0-100 km/h
1.6	02/1988–07/1989	Inline-4, Petrol, Water-Cooled	SOHC, 2 valves per cylinder Toothed-Belt, Bucket-tappets.	Carburetor	-	RF (Note: No Catalytic Converter)	1595 cc, 81.0 × 77.4 mm	9.0 :1	53 kW (72 PS) at 5200 rpm	120 Nm at 2700 rpm	FWD	4M, 5M	161–169 km/h	16.3–16.6 s
1.6	02/1988–07/1990	Inline-4, Petrol, Water-Cooled	SOHC, 2 valves per cylinder Toothed-Belt, Bucket-tappets.	Mono-Jetronic	-	1F	1595 cc, 81.0 × 77.4 mm	9.0 :1	53 kW (72 PS) at 5200 rpm	125 Nm at 2750 rpm	FWD	4M, 5M	161–169 km/h	16.3–16.6 s
1.6	02/1988–09/1993	Inline-4, Petrol, Water-Cooled	SOHC, 2 valves per cylinder Toothed-Belt, Bucket-tappets.	Carburetor	-	EZ, ABN	1595 cc, 81.0 × 77.4 mm	9.0 :1	55 kW (75 PS) at 5200 rpm	125 Nm at 2600 rpm	FWD	4M, 5M	165–171 km/h	15.7–16.0 s
1.8	08/1990–09/1993	Inline-4, Petrol, Water-Cooled	SOHC, 2 valves per cylinder Toothed-Belt, Bucket-tappets.	Mono-Motronic	-	AAM	1781 cc, 81.0 × 86.4 mm	9.0:1	55 kW (75 PS) at 5000 rpm	140 Nm at 2500 rpm	FWD	5M	165–171 km/h	15.5–15.8 s
1.8	02/1988–06/1990	Inline-4, Petrol, Water-Cooled	SOHC, 2 valves per cylinder Toothed-Belt, Bucket-tappets.	Mono-Jetronic	-	RP	1781 cc, 81.0 × 86.4 mm	9.0:1	66 kW (90 PS) at 5250 rpm	142 Nm at 3000 rpm	FWD	5M, 4A	170–177 km/h	13.9–14.2 s
1.8	07/1990–07/1991	Inline-4, Petrol, Water-Cooled	SOHC, 2 valves per cylinder Toothed-Belt, Bucket-tappets.	Mono-Motronic	-	RP	1781 cc, 81.0 × 86.4 mm	9.0:1	66 kW (90 PS) at 5400 rpm	142 Nm at 2600 rpm	FWD	5M, 4A	170–177 km/h	13.9–14.2 s
1.8	08/1991–09/1993	Inline-4, Petrol, Water-Cooled	SOHC, 2 valves per cylinder Toothed-Belt, Bucket-tappets.	Mono-Motronic	-	ABS	1781 cc, 81.0 × 86.4 mm	10.0 : 1	66 kW (90 PS) at 5500 rpm	145 Nm at 2500 rpm	FWD	5M, 4A	170–177 km/h	13.9–16.4 s
1.8	02/1988–07/1990	Inline-4, Petrol, Water-Cooled	SOHC, 2 valves per cylinder Toothed-Belt, Bucket-tappets.	Digifant	-	PF	1781 cc, 81.0 × 86.4 mm	10.0 : 1	79 kW (107 PS) at 5400 rpm	154 Nm at 3800 rpm	FWD	5M, 4A	184–190 km/h	12.3–13.4 s
1.8	02/1988–07/1990	Inline-4, Petrol, Water-Cooled	SOHC, 2 valves per cylinder Toothed-Belt, Bucket-tappets.		-	PB	1781 cc, 81.0 × 86.4 mm	10.0 : 1	82 kW (112 PS) at 5400 rpm	159 Nm at 4000 rpm	FWD	5M, 4A	188–192 km/h	11.8–12.9 s
1.8 16v	07/1988–09/1993	Inline-4, Petrol, Water-Cooled	DOHC, timing belt, 4 valves per cylinder	K-Jetronic	-	KR	1781 cc, 81.0 × 86.4 mm	10.0 : 1	100 kW (136 PS) at 6300 rpm	162 Nm at 4800 rpm	FWD	5M	199–206 km/h	10.4–10.6 s
2.0	10/1989–09/1993	Inline-4, Petrol, Water-Cooled	SOHC, 2 valves per cylinder Toothed-Belt, Bucket-tappets.	Digifant	-	2E	1984 cc, 82.5 × 92.8 mm	10.0 : 1	85 kW (115 PS) (Note: For Syncro (AWD) with right-hand drive: 82 kW (112 PS), 162 Nm) at 5400 rpm	166 Nm at 3200 rpm	FWD, AWD	5M, 4A	185–195 km/h	11.3–12.9 s
2.0 16v	07/1988–09/1993	Inline-4, Petrol, Water-Cooled	DOHC, timing belt, 4 valves per cylinder	KE-Motronic	-	9A	1984 cc, 82.5 × 92.8 mm	10.8 : 1	100 kW (136 PS) at 5800 rpm	180 Nm at 4400 rpm	FWD	5M, 4A	197–206 km/h	10.2–11.0 s
1.8 G60	09/1989–09/1993	Inline-4, Petrol, Water-Cooled	SOHC, toothed-belt, 2 valves per cylinder	Digifant	G-lader supercharger	PG	1781 cc, 81.0 × 86.4 mm	8:0 : 1	118 kW (160 PS) at 5600 rpm	225 Nm at 3800 rpm	AWD	5M	210–215 km/h	9.6–9.8 s
2.8 VR6	04/1991–09/1993	VR6, Petrol, Water-Cooled	Twin OHC, timing chain, 2 valves per cylinder	Motronic	-	AAA	2792 cc, 81.0 × 90.3 mm	10.0 : 1	128 kW (174 PS) at 5800 rpm	235 Nm (Note: When using Super Plus 98 RON fuel: 240 Nm) at 4200 rpm	FWD	5M, 4A	214–220 km/h	8.2–8.3 s
1.6 TD	08/1988–07/1989	Inline-4, Diesel, Water-Cooled	SOHC, toothed-belt, 2 valves per cylinder	Swirl chamber injection	Garrett turbocharger, intercooled	RA	1588 cc, 76.5 × 86.4 mm	23.0 : 1	59 kW (80 PS) at 4500 rpm	155 Nm at 2500–3000 rpm	FWD	5M	164–170 km/h	16.0–16.2 s
1.6 TD	08/1989–09/1993	Inline-4, Diesel, Water-Cooled	SOHC, toothed-belt, 2 valves per cylinder	Swirl chamber injection	Garrett turbocharger, intercooled	SB	1588 cc, 76.5 × 86.4 mm	23.0 : 1	59 kW (80 PS) at 4500 rpm	152 Nm at 2300–2800 rpm	FWD	5M	164–170 km/h	16.0–16.2 s
1.9 D	05/1989–09/1993	Inline-4, Diesel, Water-Cooled	SOHC, toothed-belt, 2 valves per cylinder	Swirl chamber injection	-	1Y	1896 cc, 79.5 × 95.5 mm	23.0 : 1	50 kW (68 PS) at 4400 rpm	127 Nm at 2200–2600 rpm	FWD	5M	155–160 km/h	19.0–19.4 s
1.9 TD	04/1991–09/1993	Inline-4, Diesel, Water-Cooled	SOHC, toothed-belt, 2 valves per cylinder	Swirl chamber injection	Garrett turbocharger	AAZ	1896 cc, 79.5 × 95.5 mm	22.5 : 1	55 kW (75 PS) at 4400 rpm	140 Nm at 2200–2800 rpm	FWD	5M	160–165 km/h	17.7–18.0 s

== See also ==
- Volkswagen Passat
- Volkswagen Passat (B4)
