= 1993 French Supertouring Championship =

Seasons
- ← 1992 1994 →

The 1993 French Supertouring Championship (championnat de France de Supertourisme 1993 in French) is the nineteenth edition of the French Supertouring Championship, the first run with the FIA Supertouring regulations. The season began in Nogaro on 12 April and finished on the same track on 10 October. The championship was won by Frank Biela driving an Audi 80 Quattro for the ROC Compétition team.

== Teams and drivers ==
Team	Car	No.	Drivers
(France) ROC Compétition	Audi 80 Quattro	1	(France) Marc Sourd
(France) ROC Compétition	Audi 80 Quattro	2	(Germany) Frank Biela
(France) Team BMW Fina	BMW 318i	4	(France) Jean-Pierre Malcher
(France) Team BMW Fina	BMW 318i	6	(France) Laurent Aïello
(France) Graff Racing (France) Team Usine Alfa Romeo	Alfa Romeo 155 TS	5	(France) Philippe Gache
(France) Graff Racing (France) Team Usine Alfa Romeo	Alfa Romeo 155 TS	15	(France) Jean Alesi
(France) Graff Racing (France) Team Usine Alfa Romeo	Alfa Romeo 155 TS	55	(Brazil) Roberto Moreno
(France) Giroix Racing	SEAT Toledo	7	(France) Fabien Giroix
(France) Garage Mirabeau	BMW 318i	9	(France) François Chatriot
(France) Garage Mirabeau	BMW 318i	9	(France) Christophe Dechavanne
(France) Basso Racing	BMW 318i	10	(France) Jean-Claude Basso
(France) Pérus Racing	Ford Sierra	11	(France) Maurice Pérus
(France) Team Bandura	Peugeot 405	12	(France) Michel Bandura
(France) Team Bandura	Peugeot 405	12	(France) Daniel Bandura
Snobeck Team Opel France	Opel Vectra	16	(France) Paul Belmondo
Snobeck Team Opel France	Opel Vectra	17	(France) Alain Cudini
Snobeck Team Opel France	Opel Vectra	18	(France) Alain Ferté
Snobeck Team Opel France	Opel Vectra	26	(France) Jacques Laffite
(France) Plichet Racing	Renault 19	19	(France) Gérard Faber
(France) Plichet Racing	Renault 19	19	(France) Roger Plichet
(France) Renault Dealer Racing	Renault 19	20	(United Kingdom) Tim Harvey
(France) Renault Dealer Racing	Renault 19	24	(Switzerland) Alain Menu
(France) Peugeot Esso	Peugeot 405	21	(France) Yannick Dalmas
(France) Peugeot Esso	Peugeot 405	21	(France) Jean-Pierre Jabouille
(France) Peugeot Esso	Peugeot 405	22	(France) Christophe Bouchut
(United Kingdom) Nissan Janspeed Racing	Nissan Primera	23	(Belgium) Eric van de Poele
(United Kingdom) Nissan Janspeed Racing	Nissan Primera	23	(Australia) Mark Skaife
(France) Heuclin Racing	BMW M3	77	(France) Gérard Févrot
(France) Heuclin Racing	BMW M3	77	(France) Jacques Heuclin

== Calendar ==
Rnd	Circuit	Date	Winning driver	Winning team	Winning car
1	Nogaro	12 April	(Germany) Frank Biela	Racing Organisation Course	Audi 80 Quattro
2	Magny-Cours	2 May	(France) Laurent Aïello	Team BMW Fina	BMW 318i
3	Circuit de Dijon-Prenois	16 May	(France) Laurent Aïello	Team BMW Fina	BMW 318i
4	Pau	30 May	(Germany) Frank Biela	Racing Organisation Course	Audi 80 Quattro
5	Circuit du Val de Vienne	6 June	(Germany) Frank Biela	Racing Organisation Course	Audi 80 Quattro
6	Le Castellet	25 July	(France) Laurent Aïello	Team BMW Fina	BMW 320i
7	Circuit d'Albi	5 September	(France) Alain Cudini	Snobeck Team Opel France	Opel Vectra
8	Petit Le Mans	19 September	(Germany) Frank Biela	Racing Organisation Course	Audi 80 Quattro
9	Autodrome de Linas-Montlhéry	3 October	(France) Laurent Aïello	Team BMW Fina	BMW 320i
10	Nogaro	10 October	(Germany) Frank Biela	Racing Organisation Course	Audi 80 Quattro

== Championship standings ==
Points system given by the sum of the timing of the 2 races
**1st**	**2nd**	**3rd**	**4th**	**5th**	**6th**	**7th**	**8th**	**9th**	**10th**
20	15	12	10	8	6	4	3	2	1

- for each round it is calculated the sum of the absolute standing plus the best result achieved between the 2 races

Points system each single race
**1st**	**2nd**	**3rd**	**4th**	**5th**	**6th**	**7th**	**8th**
10	8	6	5	4	3	2	1

Only finishes in the top 6 are shown.

=== Drivers' championship ===
Pos	Driver	NOG (France)	MAG (France)	DIJ (France)	PAU (France)	VDV (France)	RIC (France)	ALB (France)	LM (France)	LMY (France)	NOG (France)	Pts
1	(Germany) Frank Biela	1	4	2	1	1		7	1	6	1	218
2	(France) Laurent Aïello		1	1		2	1			1		158
3	(France) Marc Sourd	2	5	4		4	6	10	3		2	141
4	(France) Christophe Bouchut	5	2		2	6		2		2	5	133
5	(France) Jean-Pierre Malcher	6		5	3	5	4	6	4	3	3	126
6	(France) Philippe Gache	3				3	3				4	101
7	(Brazil) Roberto Moreno			3	4		2	4	6			94
8	(France) Alain Cudini	4	6					1				75
9	(France) Yannick Dalmas						5	3	2			68
10	(France) Jean-Pierre Jabouille	5	3	6	5							52
11	(France) Paul Belmondo											29
12=	(France) Daniel Bandura											28
12=	(France) Michel Bandura									4		28
14	(France) Jean-Claude Basso									5		27
15	(France) François Chatriot							9				26
16	(France) Fabien Giroix							8				15
17	(France) Jean Alesi				6							12
18	(France) Gérard Févrot											9
19=	(France) Jacques Heuclin											7
19=	(France) Jacques Laffite										6	7
NC	(France) Christophe Dechavanne											0
NC	(France) Gérard Faber											0
NC	(France) Alain Ferté							5	5			
NC	(France) Maurice Pérus											0
NC	(France) Roger Plichet											0
NC	(Australia) Mark Skaife											0
NC	(Belgium) Eric van de Poele											0
NC	(France) Pascal Vermesse											0
Pos	Driver	NOG (France)	MAG (France)	DIJ (France)	PAU (France)	VDV (France)	RIC (France)	ALB (France)	LM (France)	LMY (France)	NOG (France)	Pts

Colour	Result
Gold	Winner
Silver	Second place
Bronze	Third place
Green	Points classification
Blue	Non-points classification
Blue	Non-classified finish (NC)
Purple	Retired, not classified (Ret)
Red	Did not qualify (DNQ)
Red	Did not pre-qualify (DNPQ)
Black	Disqualified (DSQ)
White	Did not start (DNS)
White	Withdrew (WD)
White	Race cancelled (C)
Blank	Did not practice (DNP)
Blank	Did not arrive (DNA)
Blank	Excluded (EX)

**Bold** – Pole
Italics – Fastest Lap

=== Manufacturers' Trophy ===
Pos	Manufacturer	Points
1	(Germany) Audi	157
2	(Germany) BMW	152
3	(France) Peugeot	127
4	(Italy) Alfa Romeo	112
5	(Germany) Opel	96
6	(Spain) Seat	54
7	(United States) Ford	26
