= Audi 80 =

Compact executive car

Audi 80 and Audi 90
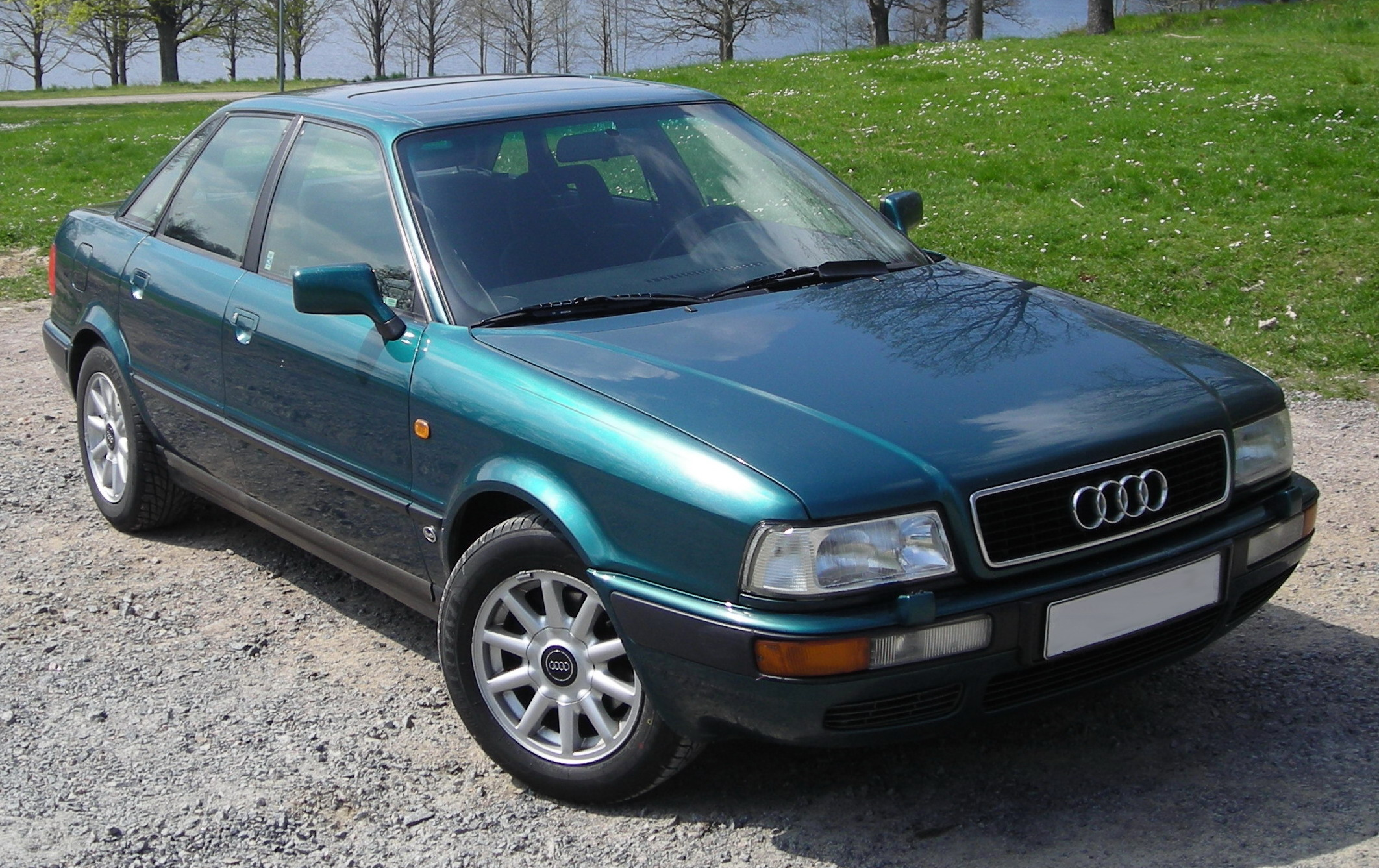
- Audi 80 (B4)

Overview
- Manufacturer: Audi
- Also called: Audi Fox; Audi 4000; Audi 4000 5+5; Audi 5+5; Audi 4000S
- Production: 1966–1996
- Assembly: Germany: Ingolstadt; Germany: Emden; Germany: Wolfsburg; Australia: Clayton, Melbourne; South Africa: Uitenhage

Body and chassis
- Class: Compact executive car (D)
- Layout: Longitudinal front-engine design, front-wheel-drive or quattro permanent four-wheel-drive
- Platform: Volkswagen Group B platform
- Related: Audi Cabriolet; Audi Coupé; Volkswagen Passat

Chronology
- Predecessor: Audi F103
- Successor: Audi A4 (Saloon and Avant); Audi A5 (Coupé and Cabriolet)

The Audi 80 is a compact executive car produced by the Audi subdivision of the Volkswagen Group across four generations from 1966 to 1996. It shared its platform with the Volkswagen Passat from 1973 to 1986 and was available as a saloon, and estate — the latter marketed by Audi as the Avant. The coupé and convertible models were not badged as members of the range, but used a derivative of the same platforms.

In North America and Australia, the 80 was marketed as the Audi Fox for model years 1973–1979, as the Audi 4000 for model years 1980–1987 in the US, as Audi 4000 5+5 from 1981 in the US, and Audi 5+5 in Australia during 1981 through 1983.

The Audi 90 was an upmarket version of the Audi 80, although all North American sedans of the B4 generation were called Audi 90.

== Naming convention ==
Under Audi's platform numbering convention, the 80 is classified as a member of the B-series or B platform family of vehicles, with the four generations of 80 being numbered as B1, B2, B3, and B4; its replacement – the Audi A4 – continues this sequence with platform numbers B5 through to B9. Originally this numbering convention ran concurrently with that of the Volkswagen Passat, the first generation of which was essentially a badge-engineered clone of the Audi 80. This link was severed in 1988 when the Passat moved to a transverse-engined, VW-specific platform for its 80-unrelated B3 and B4 versions. The Passat was based again on the Audi A4 (B5 or "8D" platform) for its B5 generation, and returned to a transverse engine for the B6 and later generations.

== F103 (1966–1972) ==
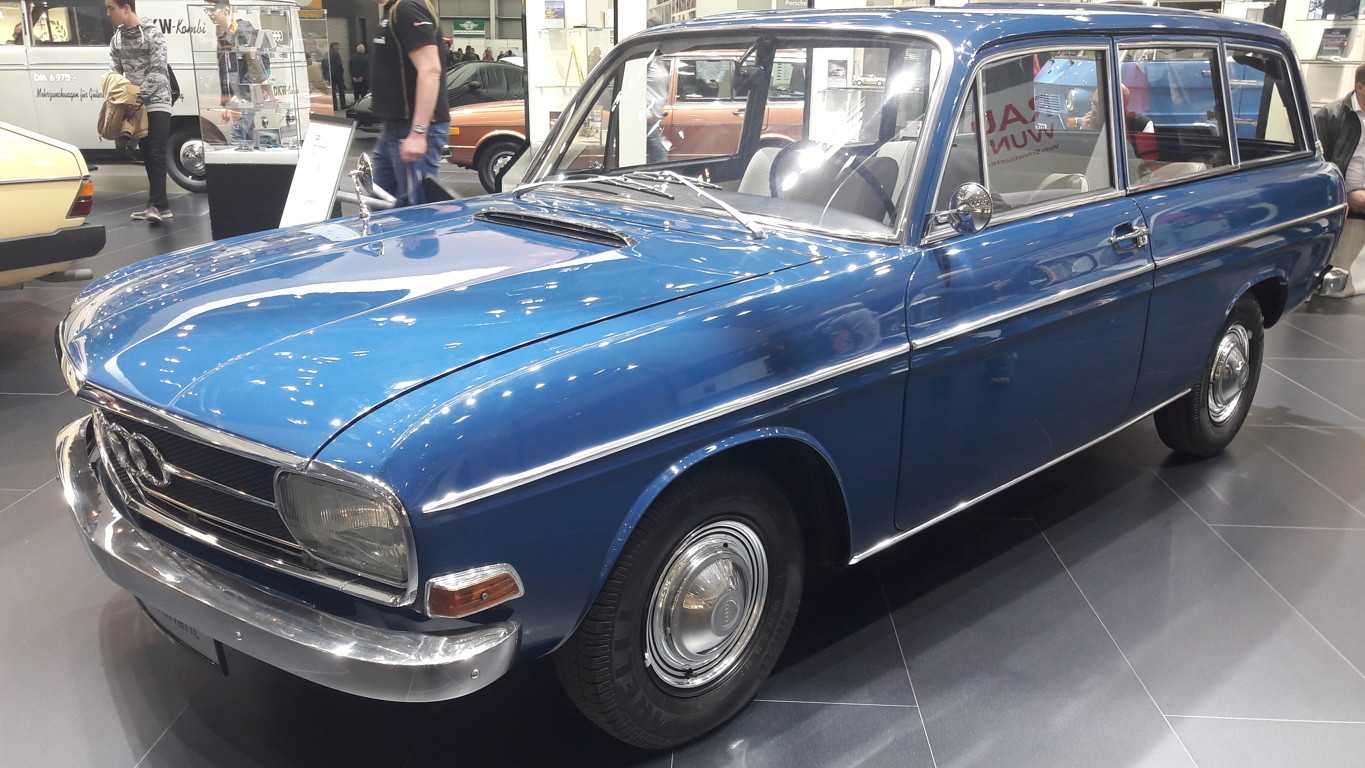
Audi 80 Variant (F103)

The Audi F103 series, based on the DKW F102 but with an all-new range of four-stroke engines developed in conjunction with Daimler-Benz, was sold between 1965 and 1972. It comprised several models named for their horsepower ratings. From 1966 to 1969 this series included an Audi 80, and there were also Audi 60, 72, 75, and Super 90 models available over the years.

== B1 (1972–1978) ==
Audi 80 B1 (80/82)
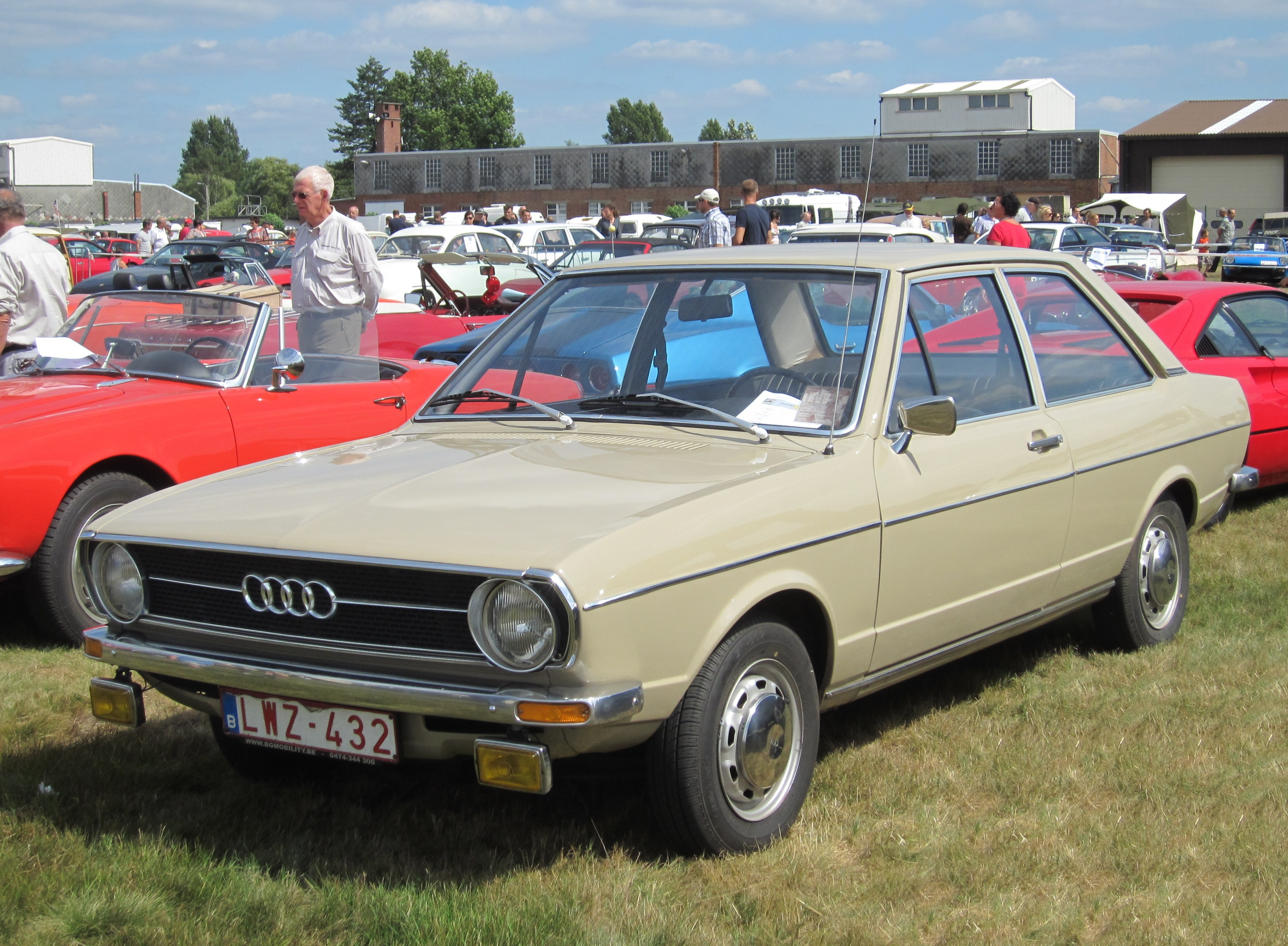
- Audi 80 (B1) 2-door sedan (pre-facelift)

Overview
- Also called: Audi Fox (North America & Australia)
- Production: 1972–1978; 1,103,766 built
- Assembly: Germany; Australia: Clayton, Melbourne; South Africa: Uitenhage
- Designer: Giorgetto Giugiaro at Italdesign

Body and chassis
- Body style: 2/4-door saloon 5-door estate
- Layout: Front-engine, front-wheel-drive
- Platform: Volkswagen Group B1 platform
- Related: Volkswagen Passat (B1)

Powertrain
- Engine: 1.3 L I4; 1.5 L I4; 1.6 L I4
- Transmission: 4-speed manual 3-speed automatic

Dimensions
- Wheelbase: 2,470 mm (97.2 in)
- Length: 4,175 mm (164.4 in)
- Width: 1,600 mm (63.0 in)
- Height: 1,362 mm (53.6 in)

Chronology
- Predecessor: Audi 60/75
- Successor: Audi 80 (B2)

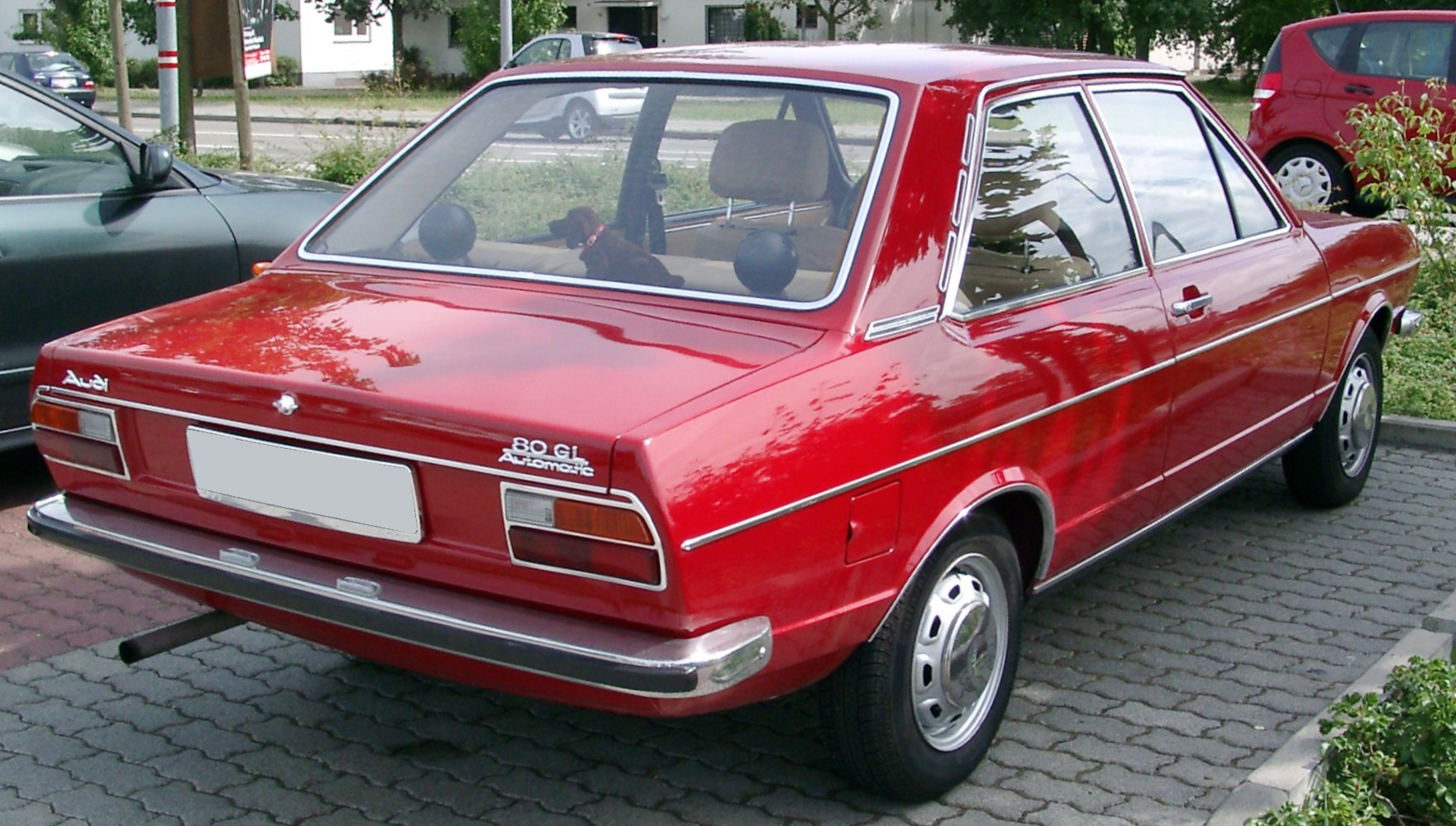
Audi 80 (B1) 2-door sedan pre-facelift (rear)

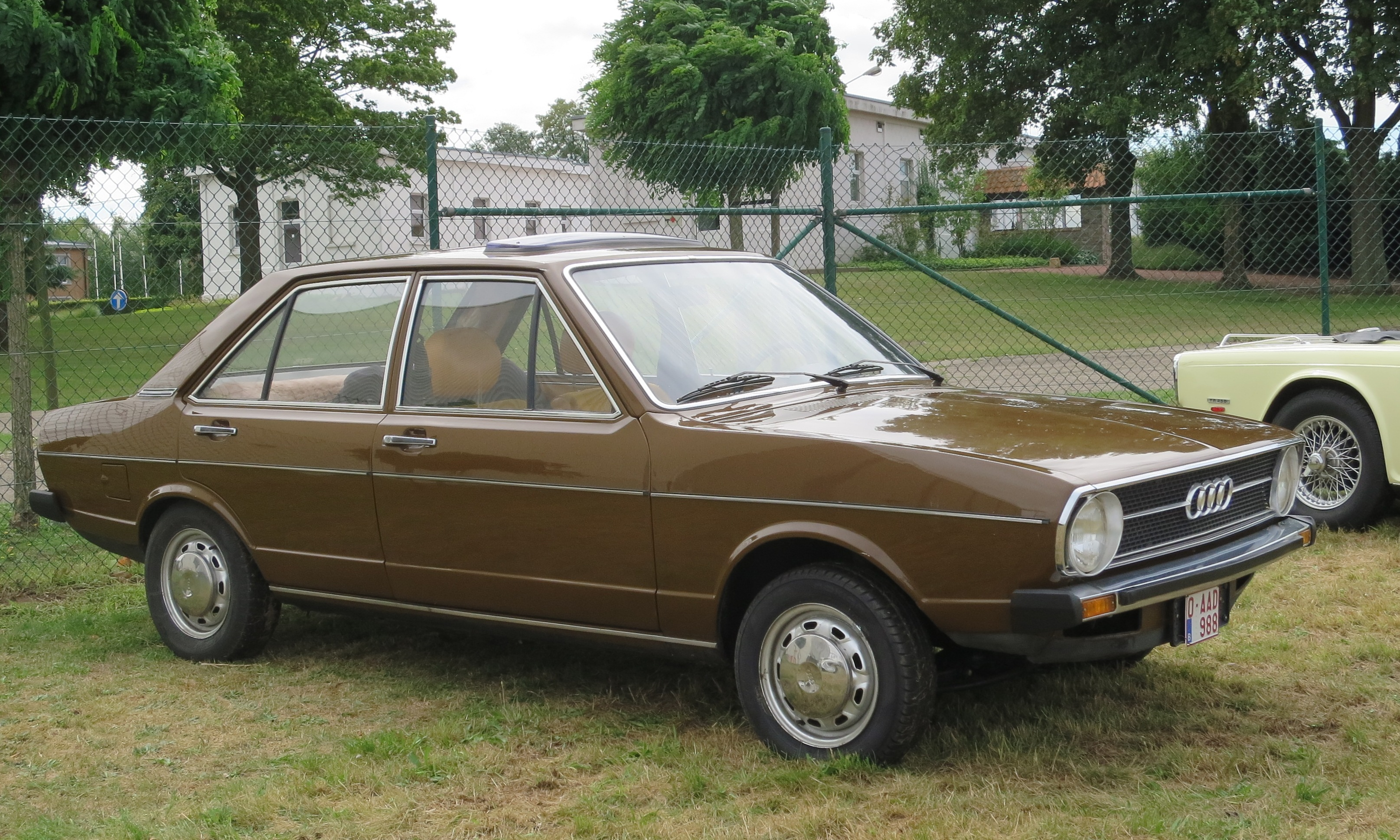
Audi 80L (B1) 4-door sedan pre-facelift

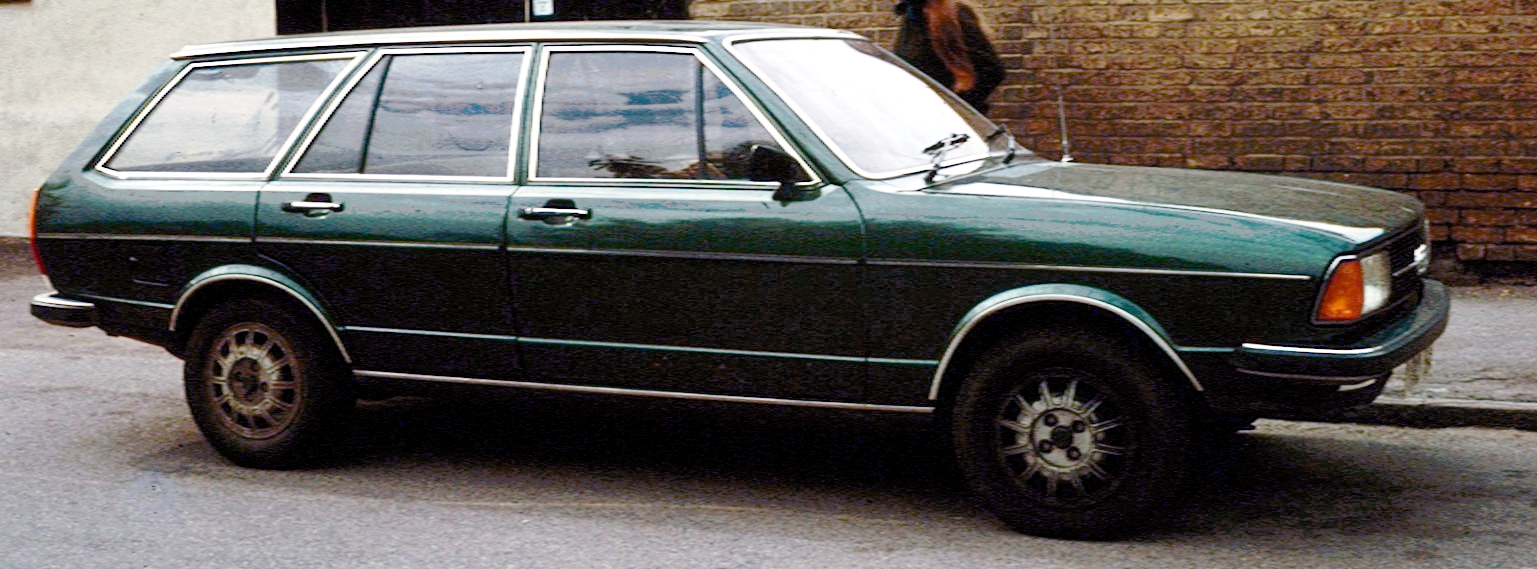
Audi 80 (B1) estate (facelift)

This model debuted in Europe in 1972 as the Audi 80, and in 1973 in Australia and North America (Canada and the USA) as the Audi Fox, and was available as either a two-door or a four-door saloon (sedan). It effectively took the place of several models that Audi had discontinued (the F103 series, which included the first model designated as an "Audi 80"), and provided the company with a viable rival to the Opel Ascona and the Ford Taunus (Ford Cortina in the UK), as well as more upmarket offerings including the Alfa Romeo Alfetta and Triumph Dolomite.

The Audi 80 B1 was only the second modern-era Audi product to be developed entirely under Volkswagen ownership - Audi chief engineer Ludwig Kraus had famously been disparaging about the outgoing F103 series, referring to it as the "bastard", owing to its Auto Union/DKW bodyshell and Mercedes-Benz engine. The B1 was a clean break from the Auto Union era, being equipped with a range of brand new 1.3- and 1.5-litre SOHC inline-four petrol engines - the first appearance of the now legendary EA827 series of engines, whose descendants are still used in VW Group vehicles to the present day. The internal combustion engines were available in various rated power outputs. For the 1.3-litre engines, (identification code: ZA) was rated at 55 PS (40 kW; 54 bhp), code: ZF was rated at 60 PS (44 kW; 59 bhp). The 1.5-litre (codes: ZB, ZC) at 75 PS (55 kW; 74 bhp) for the ZB and 85 PS (63 kW; 84 bhp) for the ZC.

On the home market, two-door and four-door saloons were available in base trim (55 or 60 PS, called simply Audi 80 and 80 S, respectively), as L models (LS with 75 PS engine) or as a more luxurious GL (85 PS only). In September 1973, Audi added the sporty 80 GT (two-door only) featuring a carburettor 1.6-litre engine (code: XX) rated at 100 PS (74 kW; 99 bhp).

The Audi 80 had a MacPherson strut front suspension, and a C-section beam rear axle located by trailing arms and a Panhard rod, and using coil springs and telescopic dampers.

Audi's design and development efforts paid off during the 1973 European Car of the Year competition where the 80 won ahead of the Renault 5 and the Alfa Romeo Alfetta.

A facelift in autumn 1976 brought about a revised front end in the style of the newly introduced Audi 100 C2 with square instead of round headlights, 1.6- instead of 1.5-litre engines (still of 75/85 PS) and a new 80 GTE model with a fuel-injected version of the 1.6-litre (110 PS (81 kW; 108 bhp)) replacing the former 80 GT.

In certain markets a five-door "Avant" (Audi's name for an estate/wagon) variant was offered — effectively a rebadged Volkswagen Passat with Audi front panels. This version, first seen in mid-1975, appeared in the United States, South Africa, and several other markets.

The Fox originally had a 1.5 litre engine rated at 55 hp (41 kW; 56 PS), attached to a four-speed manual transmission. Subsequent versions came with 1.6-litre engines rated at 83 hp (62 kW; 84 PS). By 1978, ever more stringent emissions rules meant that this had dropped to 78 hp (58 kW; 79 PS). Four-speed manuals or three-speed automatics were on offer, in all three bodystyles. Aside from the required larger bumpers, early models looked very similar to their European counterparts, while facelift versions (model year 1977) received a large black grille with double, round headlights, without the wraparound turn signals used elsewhere. There was also a sporting GTi package on offer in later years. The B1 platform was dropped from the European market in 1978, although it was sold into the 1979 model year in North America.

== B2 (1978–1986) ==
Audi 80 B2 (81)
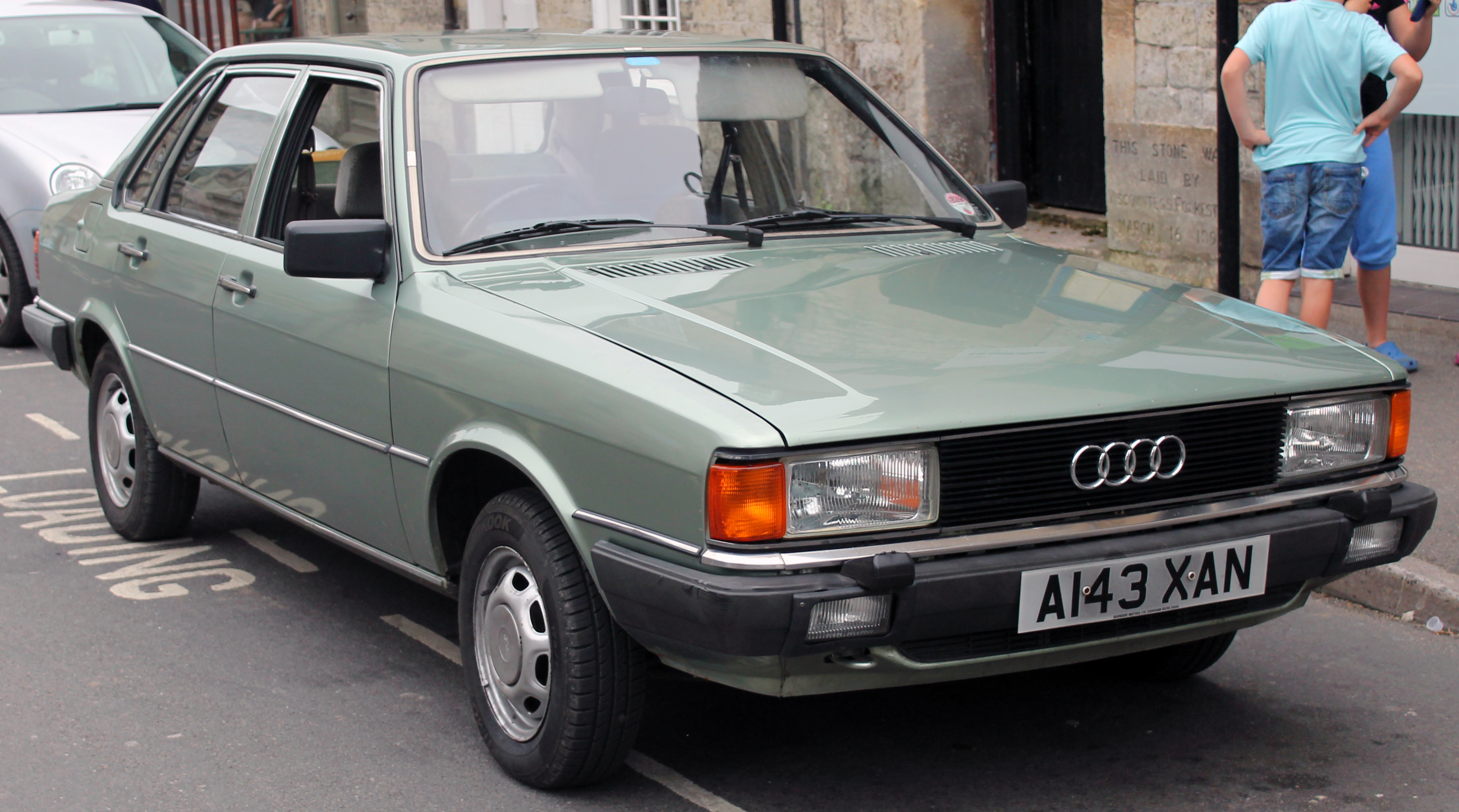
- 1983 Audi 80 1.8 GL (European version with single headlamps)

Overview
- Also called: Audi 90; Audi 4000 (North America); Audi 5+5 (Australia)
- Production: 1978–1986; 1,680,146 built (Note: Figures given for calendar years, some overlap with predecessor/successor models; actual figures therefore slightly lower.); 80: 1,405,506; 90: 105,593; Coupé: 169,047
- Designer: Giorgetto Giugiaro at Italdesign

Body and chassis
- Body style: 2-door saloon; 4-door sedan
- Layout: Front-engine, front-wheel-drive or quattro permanent four-wheel-drive
- Platform: Volkswagen Group B2 platform
- Related: Audi Coupé (B2); Audi Quattro; Volkswagen Passat (B2)

Powertrain
- Engine: 1272 cc FY/FZ I4; 1297 cc EA827 I4; 1588 cc EA827 I4; 1595 cc EA827 I4; 1715 cc EA827 I4 (North America); 1781 cc EA827 I4; 1921 cc I5; 1994 cc I5; 2144 cc I5; 2226 cc I5; 1588 cc JK/CR diesel I4; 1588 cc CY turbodiesel I4
- Transmission: 4-speed manual; 5-speed manual; 3-speed automatic

Dimensions
- Wheelbase: 2,540 mm (100.0 in)
- Length: 4,383 mm (172.6 in); 4,488 mm (176.7 in) (1980 Audi 4000)
- Width: 1,682 mm (66.2 in)
- Height: 1,365 mm (53.7 in)
- Kerb weight: 1,060 kg (2,337 lb) (1987 Audi 4000S)

Chronology
- Predecessor: Audi 80 (B1)
- Successor: Audi 80 (B3)

Audi presented a redesigned 80 based on the B2 platform (Typ 81) in September 1978 and deliveries of the four-door sedan began a few weeks later in Europe. Deliveries of the fuel injected GLE and two-door bodied cars began early in 1979. The redesigned car was first seen in North America in 1979 (as a 1980 model). Audi continued to use the 80 nameplate in Europe, but badged their Typ 81 as the Audi 4000 in North America. The body of the B2 Audi 80 was designed by Giorgetto Giugiaro. No Avant variant was available, as the Volkswagen Passat filled that role, as the B2 was intended to move the 80 upmarket from the mid-sized family segment to a compact executive model pitched to rival the BMW 3 Series. The B2 also acted in a de facto sense, as a replacement for the ill-fated NSU Ro 80 that ceased production the year before, since Audi dropped the NSU brand completely following that car's demise. The corresponding B2 version of the Passat appeared two years later and, although the two cars shared the same platform and running gear as before, the Passat had a much stronger visual identity distinct from its Audi 80 sister in comparison with the B1.

The 80 first became available with four-wheel drive in 1983. The model was essentially an Ur-Quattro without the turbocharger and with saloon bodywork. The four-wheel drive 80, however, weighed more than a front-wheel drive Audi 100 CD with the same 2144 cc 136 PS (100 kW; 134 hp) engine, and with its worse aerodynamics it was slower than the larger, better-equipped, and lower-priced 100. Top speeds are 187 and 199 km/h (116 and 124 mph) respectively, with similar fuel economy advantages for the larger 100. The 80 quattro received twin headlamps, a front spoiler with integrated foglights, and a body-coloured rubber spoiler on the rear. There was also a "quattro" script on the bootlid and a twin exhaust. The luggage compartment was marginally smaller (mostly in height), which meant only a temporary spare wheel could be fitted. The 80 quattro was a bargain compared to the Ur-Quattro, but less so in comparison with the two-wheel drive 80 GTE or the 100 CD, although they did not offer the impressive road holding that the quattros do.

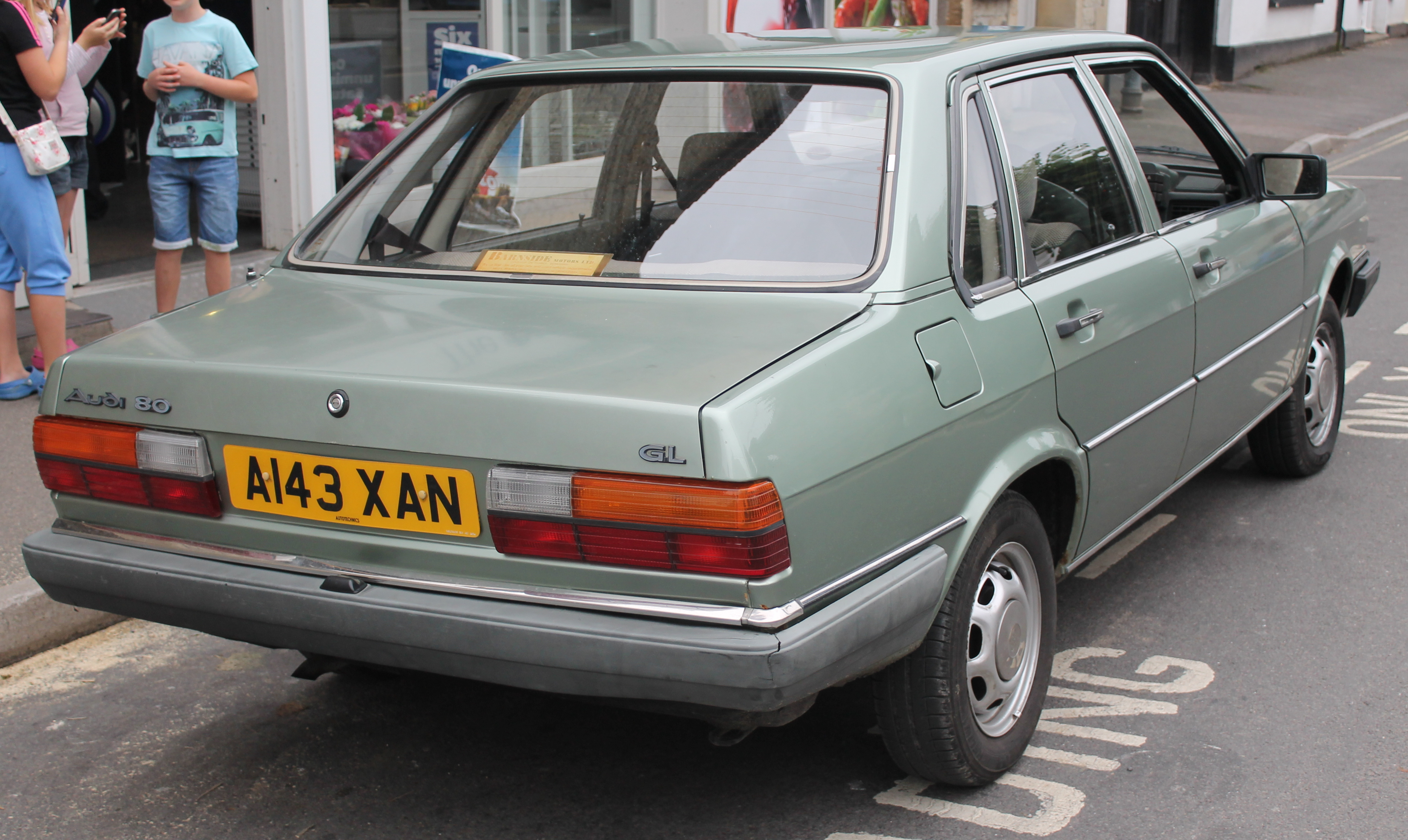
1983 Audi 80 1.8 GL (United Kingdom)

In Europe, the 80 was the standard model, while after a 1984 facelift the Audi 90 was launched as a larger-engined version of the 80; with more options, and, aside from the 70 PS (51 kW; 69 bhp), four-cylinder 1.6-litre turbodiesel (TD) engine which was also available for the 80, two five-cylinder in-line petrol engines — a 2.0-litre with 115 PS (85 kW; 113 bhp) and a 2.2-litre with 136 PS (100 kW; 134 bhp) which was later enlarged into a 2.3-litre. The 2.2-litre was available with a catalytic converter and power ratings of 115 PS (85 kW; 113 bhp) for front-drive and 120 PS (88 kW; 118 bhp) for quattro models. European models had two headlamp casings, while North American models generally had quad headlamps.

In 1983, the 80 Sport was introduced in the UK, based on the GTE. It came with quattro-style Ronal alloys, rubber rear spoiler, deep chin spoiler, striped charcoal Recaro interior, and optional body graphics including full-length "Audi Sport" stripes.

=== 1984 facelift ===
In Mid-1984 for the 1986 model year, Audi gave the B2 a subtle facelift with tail lights resembling the ones of the Typ 44 Audi 100, and different front and rear bumpers and headlights and an updated interior. In Europe, engines with catalytic converter emissions controls were made available for the first time. The 1.6- and 1.8-litre engines were replaced by newer iterations of the same, enabling the fitment of catalytic converters.

The B2 platform proved to be both quite versatile and quite profitable; many components were shared to or borrowed from the Audi Coupé, Audi Quattro, and Audi Sport Quattro, which in the process helped to cement the company into the public eye after their quattro permanent four-wheel-drive system proved useful in various forms of racing.

The saloons were offered until late 1986 in Europe and 1987 abroad, and the B2-based Audi Coupé lasted through to 1988 (as an early 1989 model) before being changed. The Coupé shared many components, and its basic body shape, with the original Audi Quattro.

== 4000 ==
=== 4000 (North America) ===
The North American Audi 4000 was first introduced for the 1980 model year, with a 1588 cc inline-four with 76 hp (57 kW). This engine came in for some criticism, being somewhat buzzy and underpowered for a car in this price segment. Audi did not offer an automatic transmission, as the engine could not quite cope. A five-speed transmission was also not available until the 1981 model year. For 1981, the 4000 received a long-stroke 1.7-litre engine and a standard five-speed manual (with a three-speed automatic still available). The new engine was a fifty-state version with a three-way catalyst, and power dropped to 74 hp (55 kW). Nonetheless, more torque and the new gearbox translated into better performance and improved gas mileage.

==== Audi 4000 5+5 (North America) ====
The Audi 4000 5+5 was launched onto the American market in the 1981 model year. The 5+5 was essentially an 80 B2 two-door saloon with the 100 hp (101 PS; 75 kW) 2144 cc five-cylinder engine from the 5000 and a five-speed transmission.

The 4000 5+5 was the precursor to what would become the Audi 90. It was fitted with various sporty parts such as an oil pressure gauge, sports interior, and alloy wheels as standard equipment.

==== Audi 5+5 (Australia) ====
The Audi 5+5 name was used in the Australian market for a unique four-door Audi 80, so named as it was fitted with the 2144-cc, five-cylinder engine coupled with a five-speed manual gearbox. An automatic option was also offered. The 5+5 was marketed in Australia from October 1981 through to 1983.

==== Audi 4000S ====
The 4000 5+5 was accompanied on the American market by the 4000S. This is a more pedestrian yet well-equipped four-door version with the same engine, originally only coupled to a three-speed automatic.

After a facelift it was sold in North America in 4000S (1.8-litre) and 4000S/CS quattro (2.2-litre) derivatives, with the S and CS quattros corresponding to the European Audi 90 quattro. The Audi 4000 quattro debuted in 1984 and was sold in four colors, Black, Alpine White, Tornado Red, and optional Zermatt Silver metallic. It came standard with a five-speed manual transmission, brown velour interior, and automatic windows up front and manuals in the rear. The early Audi 4000 models were very similar to the Audi 80 with the addition of USA mandated crash safety bumpers and quad sealed beam headlights. The mounting for the safety bumpers intruded into the luggage compartment floor, making for a very irregularly shaped and less useful space.

The S has a 1.8-litre inline-four-cylinder engine that puts out 76 kW (103 PS; 102 bhp) at 5500 rpm. The CS quattro has a CIS-E fuel-injected 2.2-litre inline-five cylinder petrol engine (identification code: JT). It displaces 2226 cc and was constructed from a grey cast-iron cylinder block, with an aluminium alloy cylinder head, and uses a timing belt-driven single overhead camshaft (SOHC). The rated horsepower is 115 hp (86 kW; 117 PS) at 5500 rpm, and the torque is 171 N⋅m (126 lbf⋅ft) at 3000 rpm. The only transmission available on the 4000CS was a five-speed close-ratio manual.

=== 4000 gallery ===
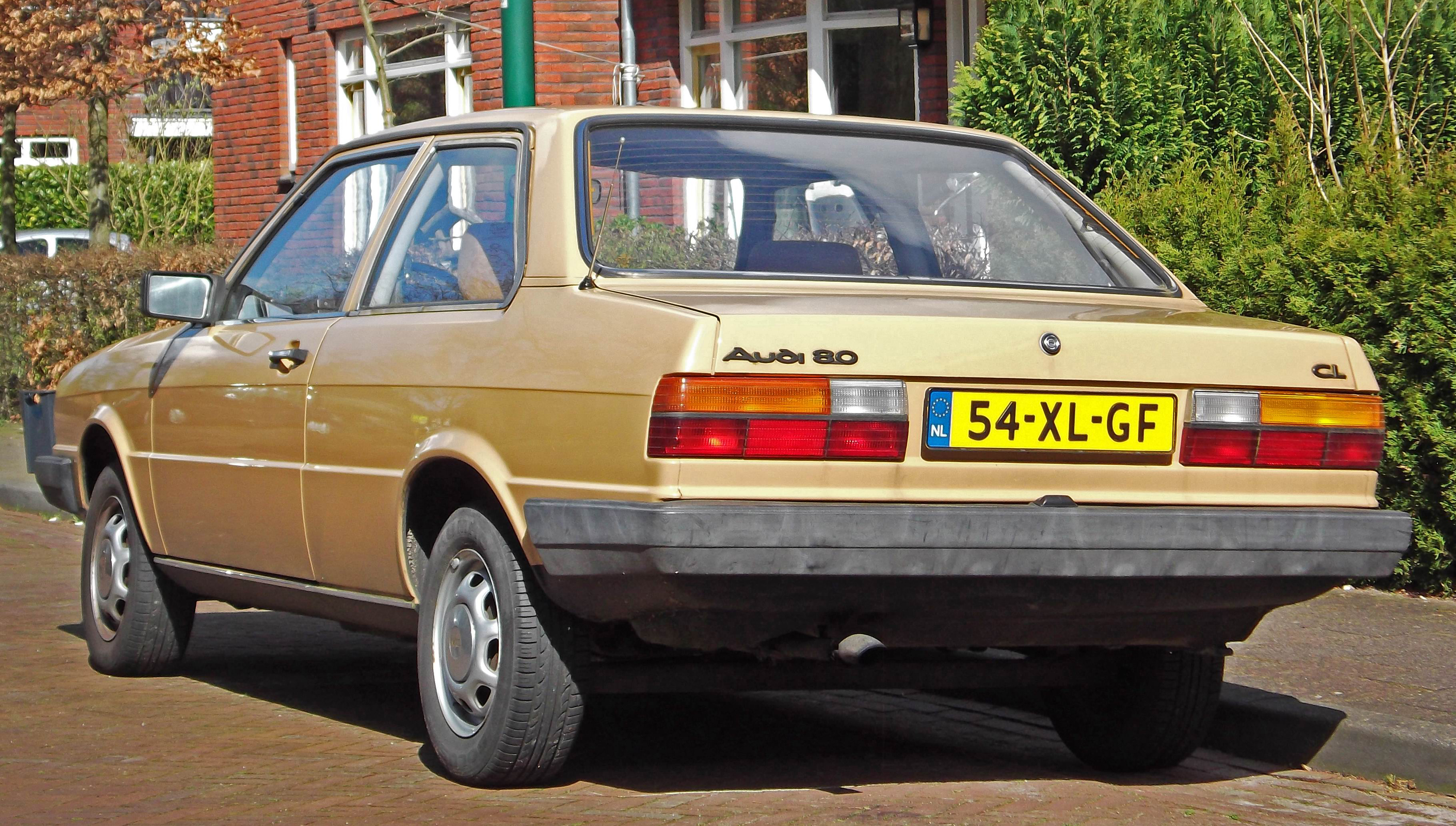
Pre-facelift Audi 80 1.3 CL two-door sedan (Europe)

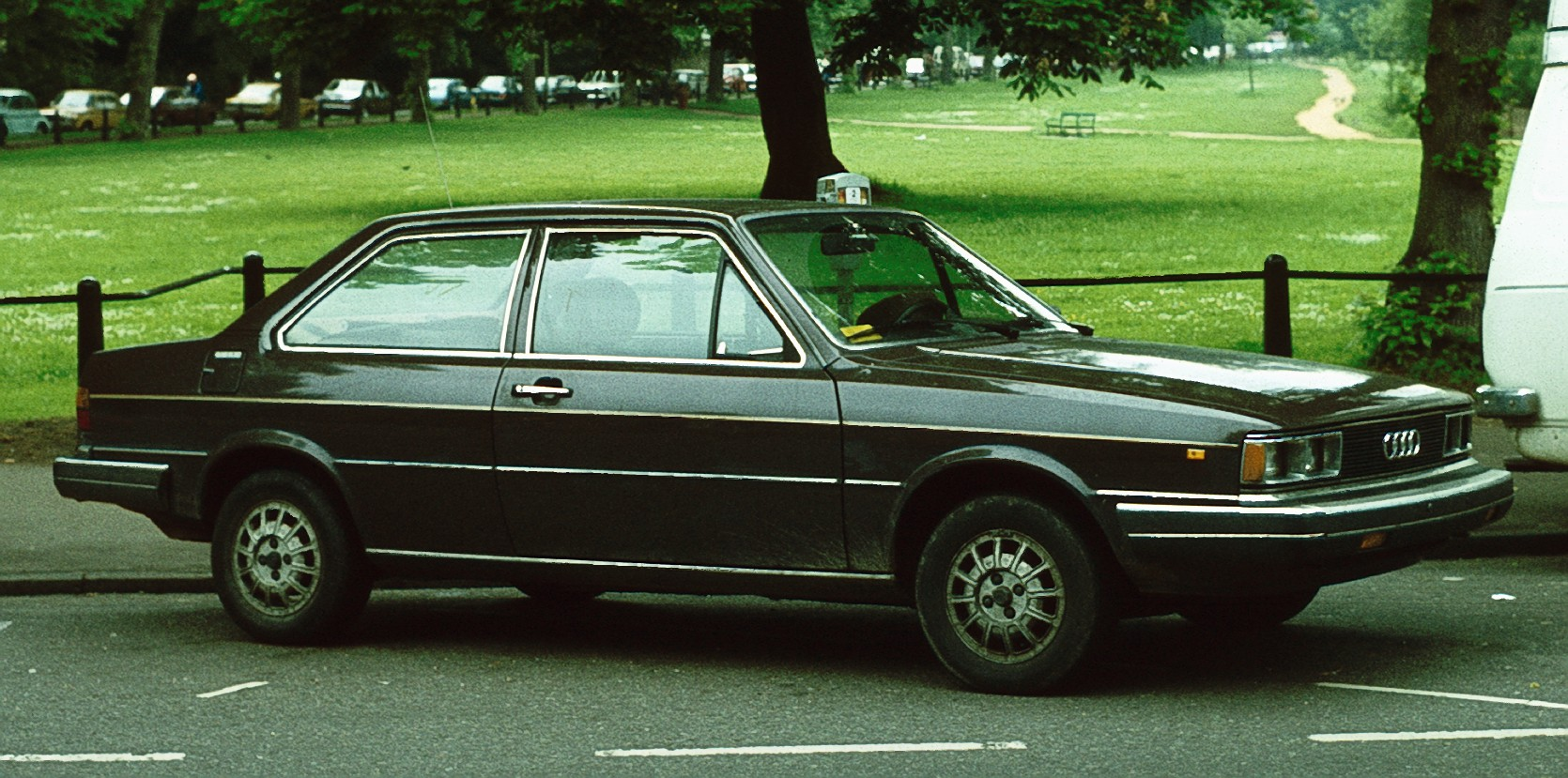
1981 Audi 4000: US-spec 2-door version, shown by the headlamp configuration and large bumpers

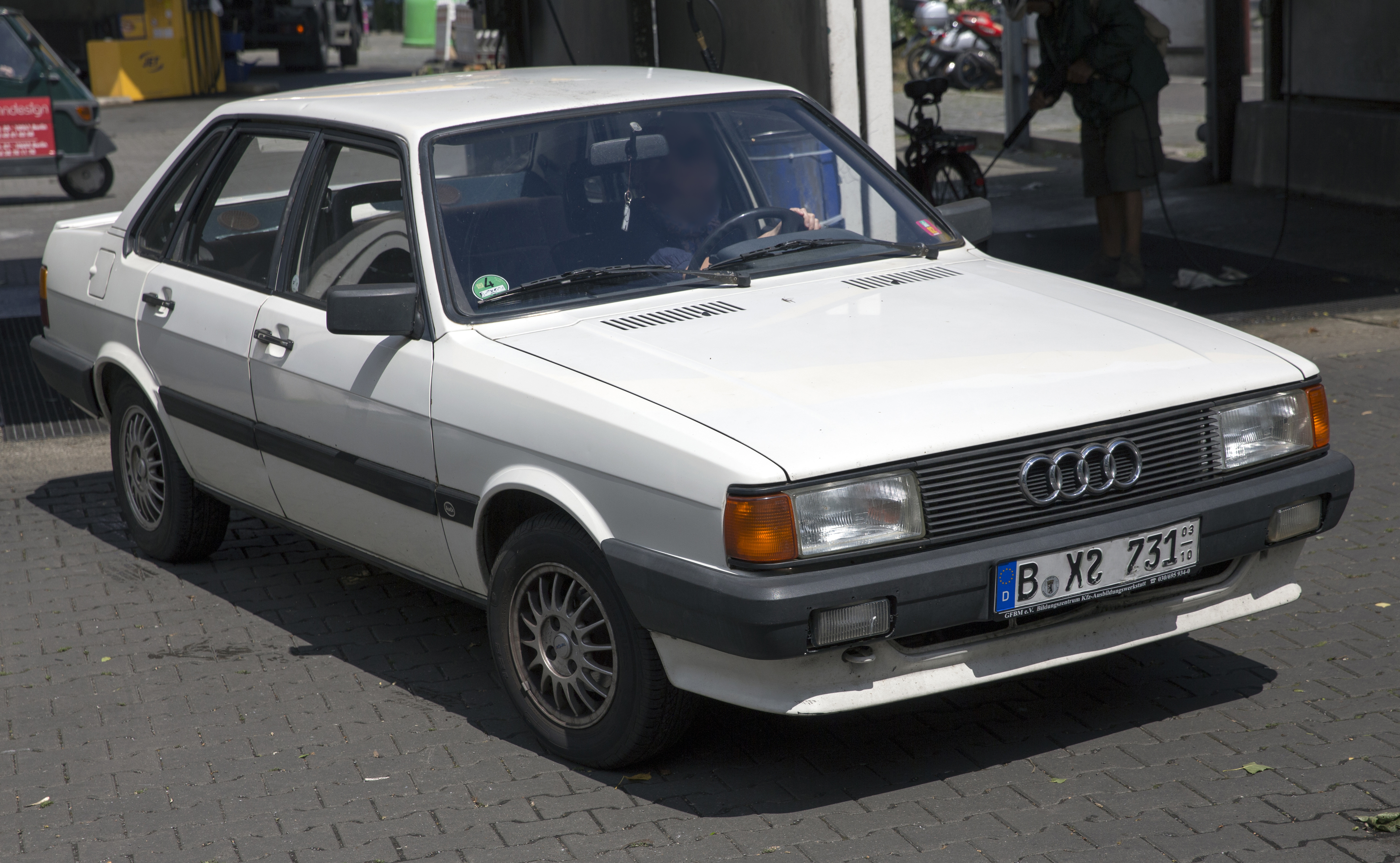
1986 Audi 80 GT (Germany)

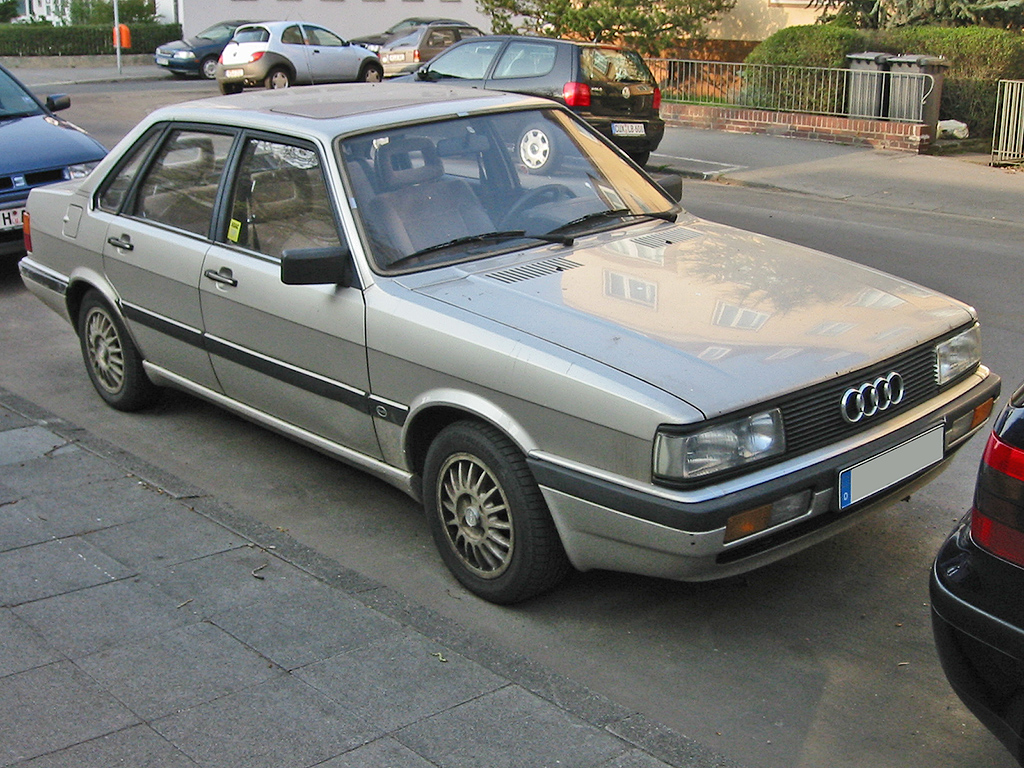
Audi 90 (1984–1986)

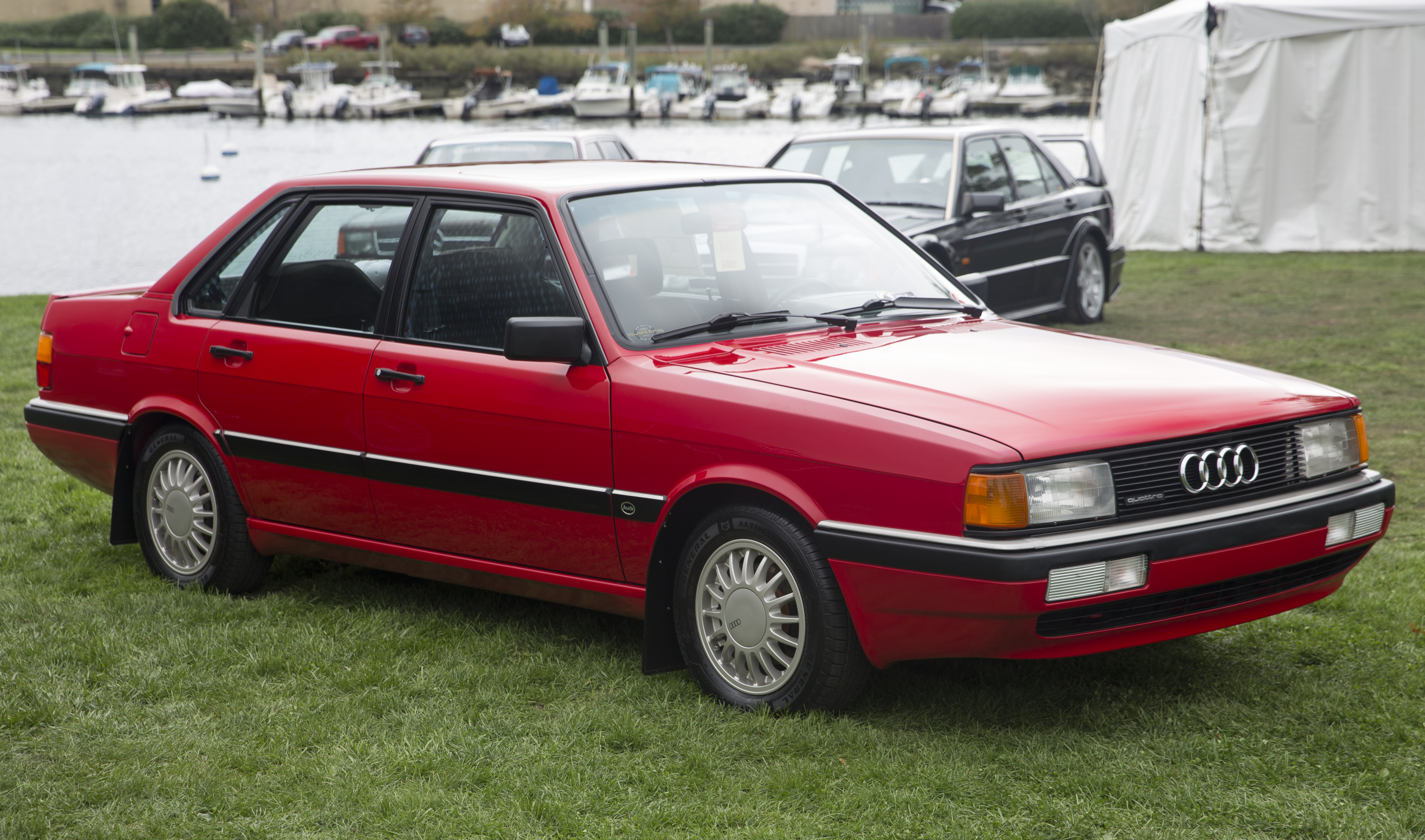
Facelift Audi 4000S quattro (North America)

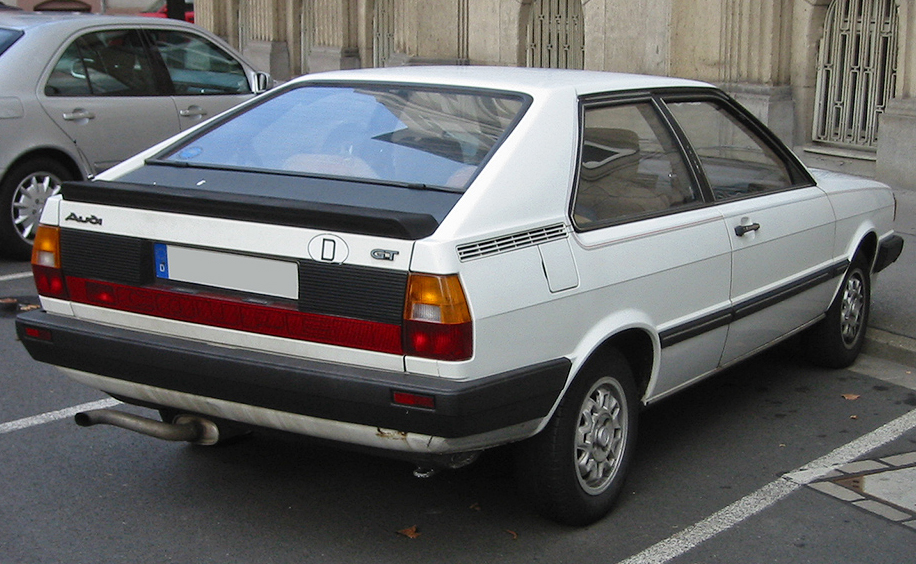
B2-based 1980–1984 Audi Coupé GT

== B3 (1986–1992) ==
Audi 80 B3 (89)
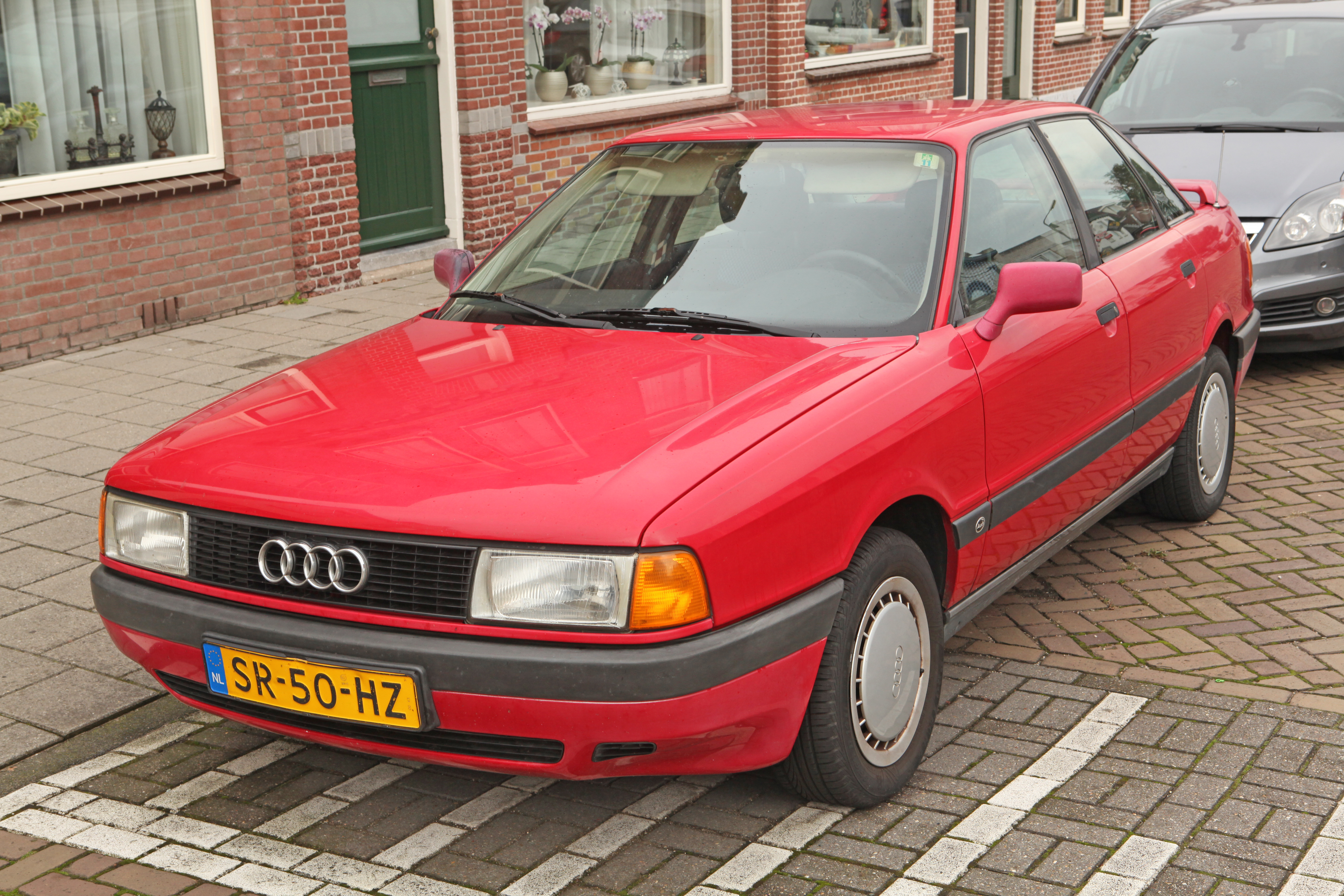

Overview
- Also called: Audi 90
- Production: 1986–1992; 1,623,382 built; 80: 1,438,475; 90: 184,907
- Designer: J Mays (1983) under Hartmut Warkuß

Body and chassis
- Body style: 4-door saloon
- Layout: Front-engine, front-wheel-drive or quattro permanent four-wheel-drive
- Platform: Volkswagen Group B3 platform
- Related: Audi Coupé (typ 8B); Audi Cabriolet (typ 8G)

Powertrain
- Engine: 80: 1.4 L I4; 1.6 L I4; 1.8 L I4; 2.0 L I4; 2.0 L 16-valve I4; 1.6 L diesel I4; 1.6 L turbodiesel I4; 1.9 L diesel I4; 90: 2.0 L I5; 2.2 L I5; 2.3 L I5; 2.3 L 20-valve I5; 1.6 L turbodiesel I4
- Transmission: 5-speed manual 3-speed automatic

Dimensions
- Wheelbase: 2,540 mm (100.0 in)
- Length: 4,404 mm (173.4 in)
- Width: 1,695 mm (66.7 in)
- Height: 1,397 mm (55.0 in)

Chronology
- Predecessor: Audi 80 (B2)
- Successor: Audi 80 (B4)

In September 1986, Audi released a new Typ 89 Audi 80 for the 1987 model year on the European market and introduced it elsewhere within a year. It was based on a new platform that broke the relationship between the 80 and the Volkswagen Passat, the corresponding third generation of which used the transverse-engined Volkswagen B3 platform, whilst Audi stuck with the longitudinal front wheel drive layout for the B3-series 80. Production codes were Typ 89 from 1987 to 1989, and Typ 8A from 1990 onward (in line with a restructuring of many VW platform designations). It introduced a new aerodynamic look and a fully zinc-coated galvanised bodyshell.

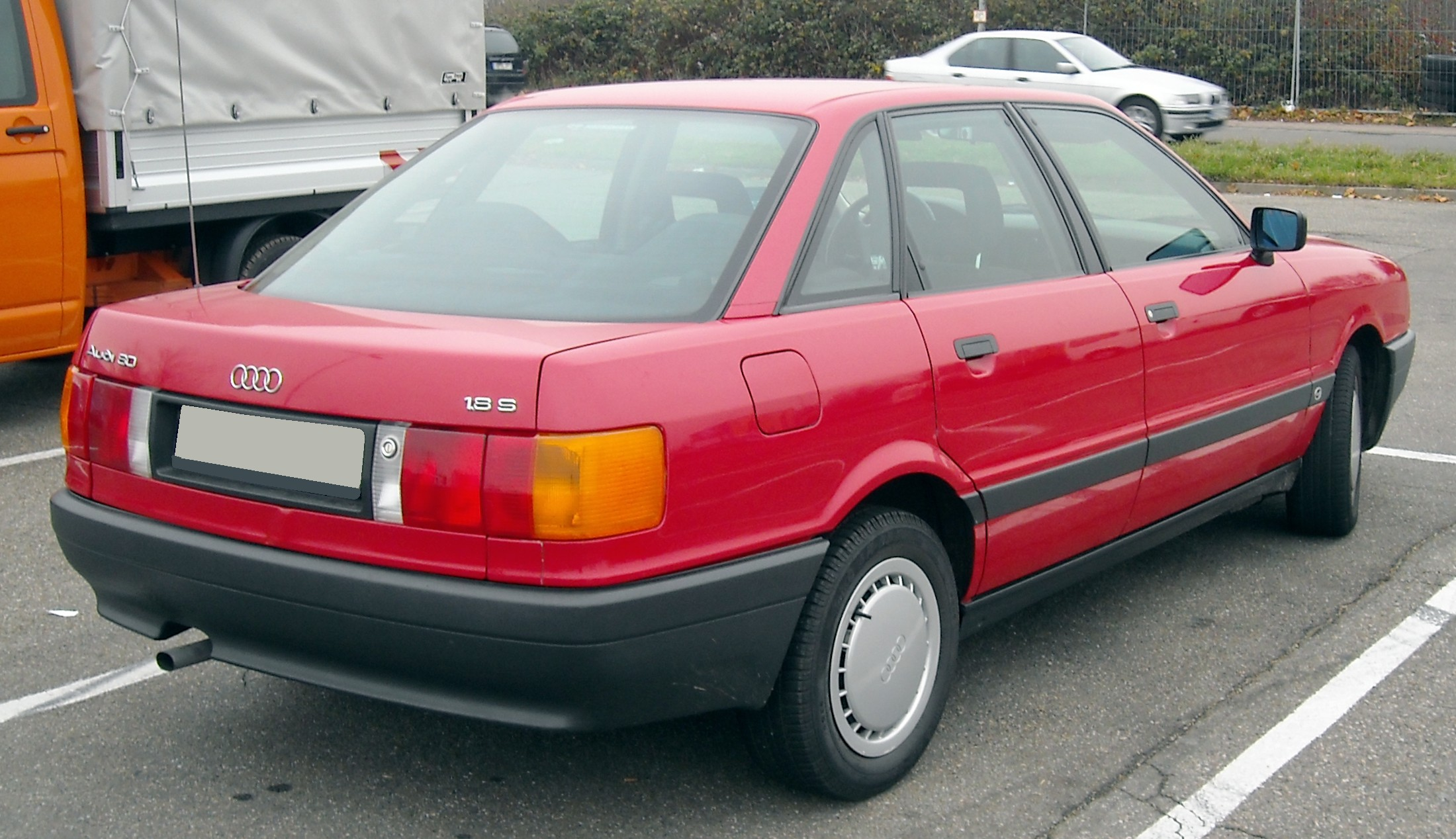
Audi 80 (Europe)

Unlike its predecessor, the B3 was marketed worldwide only as the Audi 80 or Audi 90. Initially, Audi transferred existing powertrain concepts to the new model although fuel injection was now available for some engines. A range of new petrol and diesel inline four-cylinder engines became available to European customers along with the procon-ten safety system which became standard fitment from 1991.

Procon-ten was a notable safety feature comprising a series of hidden steel cables routed behind the gearbox, attached to the steering wheel and front seatbelt inertia reels. In the event of a front impact, the engine and gearbox are forced rearward, pulling on these cables. This action simultaneously pulls the steering wheel into the dashboard to prevent the driver colliding with it while tightening the front seatbelts. This innovation was a precursor to the airbag, which became popular on mass-produced cars during the 1990s after being patented by Mercedes-Benz in 1982.

In 1987, the Audi 90 was reintroduced as an upmarket, more luxurious variant of the 80. To begin with it would again feature a choice of 10-valve inline five-cylinder petrol engines, and could be specified with or without quattro. The 90 differs visually from the 80 by a full-width tail-light panel; headlights that featured additional high-beam lights and a slightly different front grille. Indicator lamps were moved from beside the headlights to the bumpers next to the fog lights, which were standard fitment on the 90. Brightwork surrounds for the windows, tops of the bumpers and side rubbing strips were also standard. Interiors were upgraded over the 80 featuring velour seat coverings and a slightly more generous level of equipment. The then range-topping 2.2E offered a boot spoiler, alloy wheels, leather steering wheel, and sports front seats. Switchable ABS was standard on quattro versions.

From 1989 to 1991 the Audi 90 offered the first 20-valve engine from Audi since the turbocharged engine used in the Audi Sport Quattro. This new 2.3-litre engine produced 170 PS (125 kW; 168 bhp) and featured in the front wheel drive 20V, 20V Sport, and four-wheel drive 20V quattro derivatives. The non-quattro 20V models were 120 kg lighter. The Audi 80 16V, new in 1990, was also offered with the quattro system, making for a certain amount of overlap with the 2.3-liter Audi 90. The quattro 16V was built in comparably small numbers, meaning that it did not reach the initial annual production requirement of 5,000 examples required to be homologated for Group A rallying.

Externally, Sport versions of the 90 were visually distinguished by the deletion of brightwork in favour of satin black window surrounds, bumper cappings, and thinner side mouldings. A raised aluminium boot spoiler, lowered suspension, and uprated brakes were fitted as standard, Speedline wheels were also standard fitment in the UK.

In October 1988, a Coupé version based on the 80/90 appeared, called simply the Audi Coupé (typ 8B). This had completely different three-door liftback bodywork and replaced the earlier, B2-based Coupé which had been manufactured into early 1988. This version remained in production until 1996, in parallel with the succeeding B4 generation Audi 80. A convertible was planned from the beginning, but did not appear until May 1991 as the Audi Cabriolet. This model remained in production until 2000 and was optically aligned with the B4 Audi 80 from its introduction.

Altogether, the Audi 80 came with the following engine range, although not all of these were available in all markets:

Model	Displacement	Power at rpm	Torque at rpm	Fuel supply	Catalytic converter	Notes	Production period
Petrol engines
Audi 80	1399 cc	65 PS (48 kW; 64 hp) at 5,200	110 N⋅m (81 lb⋅ft) at 3,000	Carburettor	No	Greece only	
Audi 80	1595 cc	70 PS (51 kW; 69 hp) at 5,200	123 N⋅m (91 lb⋅ft) at 2,700	Carburettor	No	Austria only	03/87–07/89
Audi 80	1595 cc	70 PS (51 kW; 69 hp) at 5,200	118 N⋅m (87 lb⋅ft) at 2,700	Carburettor	Yes		08/89–12/91
Audi 80	1595 cc	75 PS (55 kW; 74 hp) at 5,200	125 N⋅m (92 lb⋅ft) at 2,700	Carburettor	No		08/86–12/91
Audi 80 1.6E	1595 cc	102 PS (75 kW; 101 hp) at 6,300	135 N⋅m (100 lb⋅ft) at 3,500	MPFI	No	Portugal and Greece	08/90–12/91
Audi 80	1781 cc	75 PS (55 kW; 74 hp) at 4,500	140 N⋅m (103 lb⋅ft) at 2,500	Carburettor	No		10/86–01/90
Audi 80	1781 cc	75 PS (55 kW; 74 hp) at 4,500	140 N⋅m (103 lb⋅ft) at 2,500	Carburettor	Yes		10/86–01/90
Audi 80 1.8S	1781 cc	88 PS (65 kW; 87 hp) at 5,200	142 N⋅m (105 lb⋅ft) at 3,300	Carburettor	Yes		08/86–07/90
Audi 80 1.8S	1781 cc	90 PS (66 kW; 89 hp) at 5,200	150 N⋅m (111 lb⋅ft) at 3,300	Carburettor	No		08/86–12/91
Audi 80 1.8S	1781 cc	90 PS (66 kW; 89 hp) at 5,400	140 N⋅m (103 lb⋅ft) at 3,350	SPFI	Yes		08/86–12/91
Audi 80 1.8S	1781 cc	90 PS (66 kW; 89 hp) at 5,400	145 N⋅m (107 lb⋅ft) at 3,350	SPFI	Yes		08/86–12/91
Audi 80 1.8S	1781 cc	90 PS (66 kW; 89 hp) at 5,500	142 N⋅m (105 lb⋅ft) at 3,250	SPFI	Yes		03/88–12/91
Audi 80 1.8E	1781 cc	112 PS (82 kW; 110 hp) at 5,800	160 N⋅m (118 lb⋅ft) at 3,400	MPFI	No		08/86–12/91
Audi 80 1.9E	1847 cc	113 PS (83 kW; 111 hp) at 5,600	160 N⋅m (118 lb⋅ft) at 3,400	MPFI	Yes		09/86–07/88
Audi 80 2.0E	1984 cc	112 PS (82 kW; 110 hp) at 5,300	168 N⋅m (124 lb⋅ft) at 3,250	MPFI	Yes		08/88–10/90
Audi 80 2.0E	1984 cc	113 PS (83 kW; 111 hp) at 5,300	170 N⋅m (125 lb⋅ft) at 3,250	MPFI	Yes		08/90–12/91
Audi 80 16V	1984 cc	137 PS (101 kW; 135 hp) at 5,800	181 N⋅m (133 lb⋅ft) at 4,500	MPFI	Yes		03/90–12/91
Diesel engines
Audi 80 Diesel	1588 cc	50 PS (37 kW; 49 hp) at 4,800	97 N⋅m (72 lb⋅ft) at 2,700–3,200	Diesel	No	Austria only	08/86–07/89
Audi 80 Diesel	1588 cc	54 PS (40 kW; 53 hp) at 4,800	100 N⋅m (74 lb⋅ft) at 2,700–3,200	Diesel	No		08/86–07/89
Audi 80 Diesel	1896 cc	68 PS (50 kW; 67 hp) at 4,400	127 N⋅m (94 lb⋅ft) at 2,200–2,600	Diesel	No		08/89–12/91
Audi 80 Turbodiesel	1588 cc	80 PS (59 kW; 79 hp) at 4,500	152 N⋅m (112 lb⋅ft) at 2,300–2,800	Turbodiesel	No		04/89–12/91
Audi 80 Turbodiesel	1588 cc	80 PS (59 kW; 79 hp) at 4,500	155 N⋅m (114 lb⋅ft) at 2,300–2,800	Turbodiesel	No		04/88–07/90

The Audi 90 came with the following engines:

Model	Displacement	Power at rpm	Torque at rpm	Catalytic converter	Engine Code	Notes	Production period
Audi 90 2.0E	1994 cc	115 PS (85 kW; 113 hp) at 5,400 rpm	172 N⋅m (127 lb⋅ft) at 4,000 rpm	Yes	PS		05/87–11/91
Audi 90 2.0E 20V	1994 cc	160 PS (118 kW; 158 hp)	190 N⋅m (140 lb⋅ft)	No	NM	Italy/Portugal only	02/88–11/91
Audi 90 2.2E	2226 cc	136 PS (100 kW; 134 hp) at 5,700 rpm	186 N⋅m (137 lb⋅ft) at 3,500 rpm	No	KV		05/87–89
Audi 90 2.3E	2309 cc	136 PS (100 kW; 134 hp) at 5,700 rpm	190 N⋅m (140 lb⋅ft) at 4,500 rpm	Yes	NG		05/87–11/91
Audi 90 2.3E 20V	2309 cc	170 PS (125 kW; 168 hp) at 6,000 rpm	220 N⋅m (162 lb⋅ft) at 4,500 rpm	Yes	7A		02/88–11/91
Audi 90 Turbodiesel	1588 cc	80 PS (59 kW; 79 hp) at 4,500	152–155 N⋅m (112–114 lb⋅ft) at 2,300–2,800	No	RA/SB		88–90

=== North America ===
In 1989, for the 1990 model year, North America received the 90 quattro model (and Coupé quattro) that was powered by a detuned 164 hp (122 kW; 166 PS) of the 20v 2.3-litre 5-cylinder engine. It was marketed in the "Grand Tourismo" (GT) style of a comfortable luxury car with sporting tendencies, as opposed to a dedicated lightweight sports car. Weighing between 3,042 lb (1,380 kg) (1990 sedan model) to 3,308 lb (1,500 kg) (1991 Coupé model), these cars were not lightweight, especially in consideration of the 164 hp powerplant (slightly less than the European version). These models can be recognised by their distinctive wheels, 14" BBS Mesh wheels or 15" Six-star Speedlines. They differed from regular 80/90 models in several ways. Notable differences include their standard leather interiors with Zebrano wood trim, additional VDO gauges mounted in the bottom of the centre console, a carbon fibre centre prop shaft, and push-button locking rear differential.

The final type 89 80s and 90s were sold as 1992 models in North America; in Europe, all type 89 sedans were discontinued at the end of the 1991 model year to give way to the B4 series; a few Audi 90 Sport Quattro with the 2.3-litre 20v engine were assembled in early 1992.

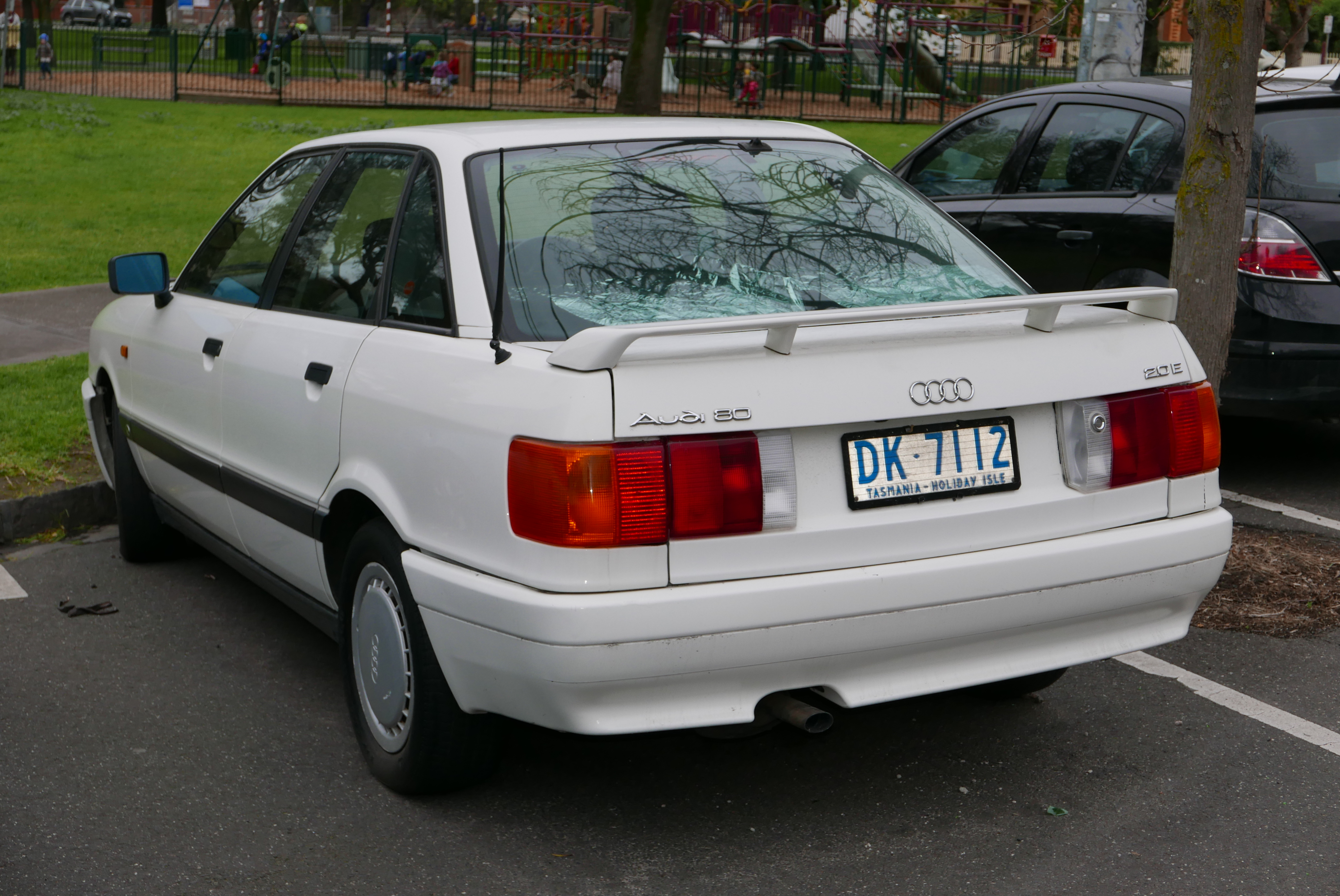
1992 Audi 80 (8A) 2.0 E

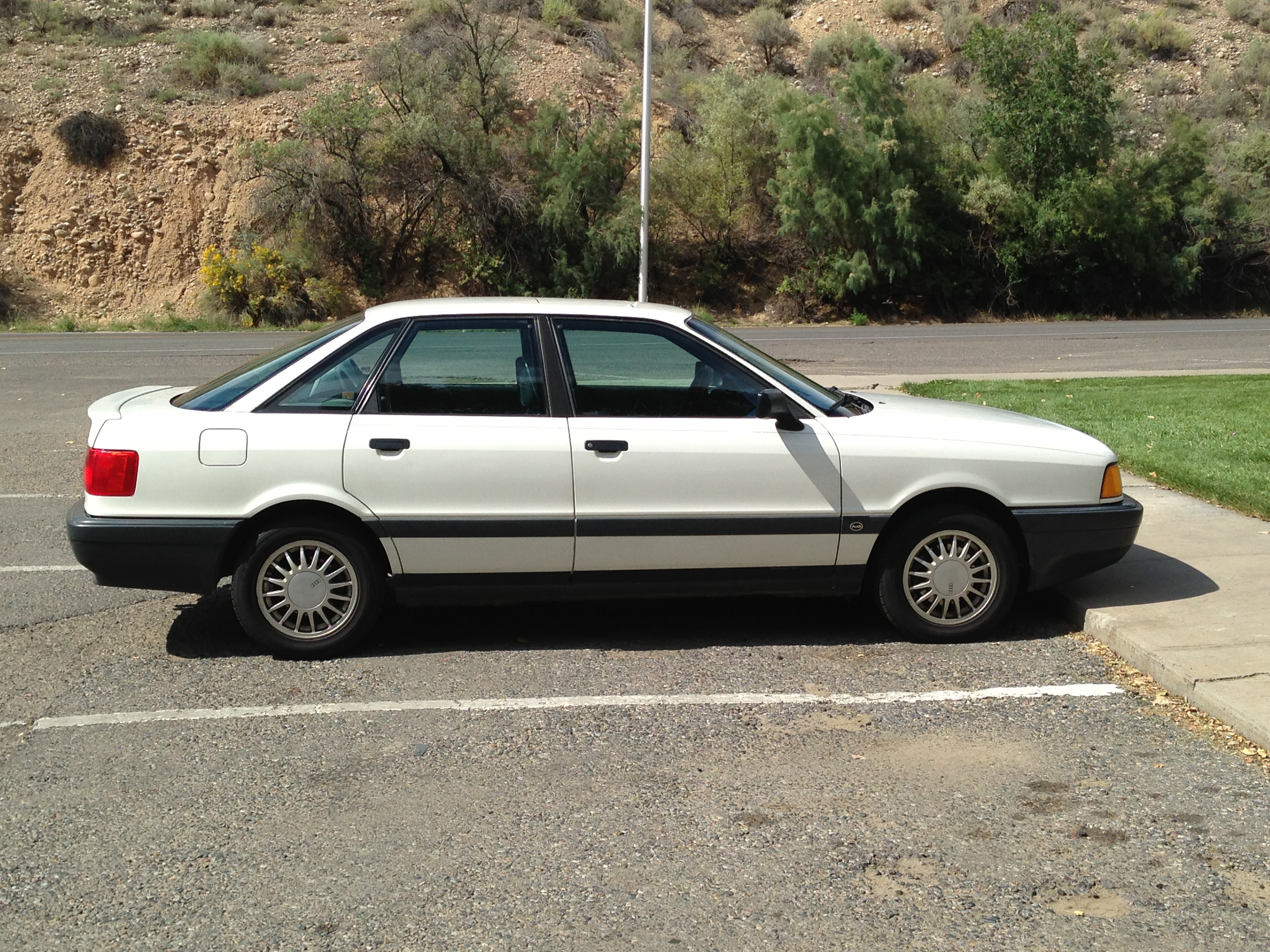
1988 Audi 80 quattro

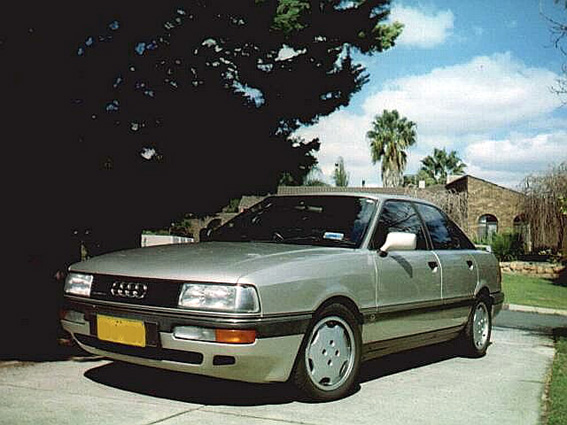
1989 Audi 90 quattro

== B4 (1991–1995) ==
Audi 80 B4 (8C)
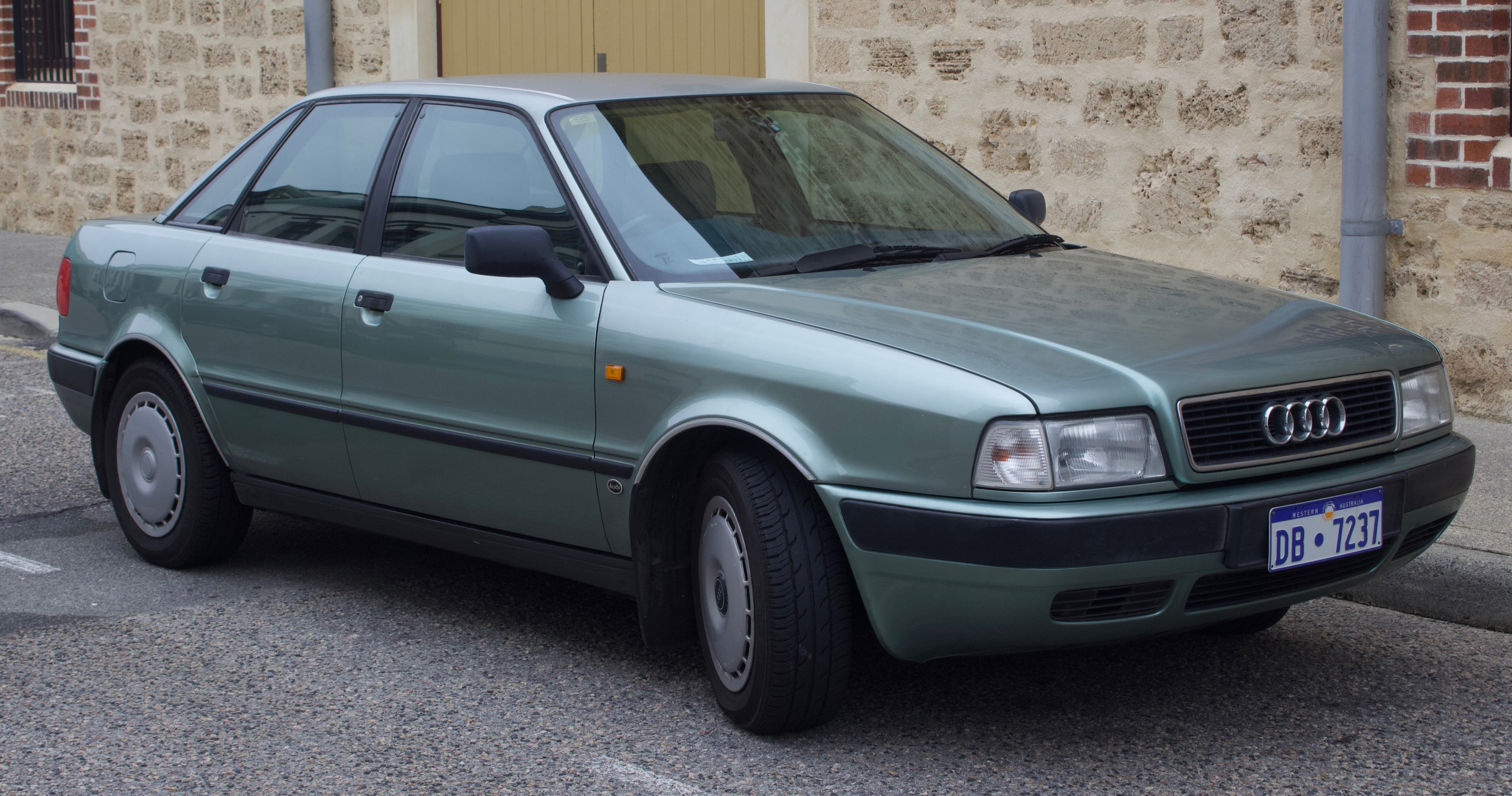

Overview
- Production: 1991–1995; 1,090,690 built 4-door: 908,255; Avant: 182,435

Body and chassis
- Body style: 4-door saloon 5-door estate
- Layout: Front-engine, front-wheel-drive or quattro permanent four-wheel-drive
- Platform: Volkswagen Group B4 platform
- Related: Audi Cabriolet; Audi Coupé; Audi S2; Audi RS2 Avant

Powertrain
- Engine: Petrol: 1.6 L I4; 2.0 L I4; 2.2 L turbo I5; 2.3 L I5; 2.6 L V6; 2.8 L V6; Diesel: 1.9 L turbo I4
- Transmission: 5-speed manual 4-speed automatic

Dimensions
- Wheelbase: 2,611 mm (102.8 in); 2,596 mm (102.2 in) (quattro)
- Length: 4,580 mm (180.3 in) (sedan)
- Width: 1,695 mm (66.7 in) (sedan)
- Height: 1,379 mm (54.3 in) (sedan, 1992–94); 1,389 mm (54.7 in) (quattro); 1,397 mm (55.0 in) (saloon, 1995)
- Kerb weight: 1,190–1,430 kg (2,624–3,153 lb)

Chronology
- Predecessor: Audi 80 (B3)
- Successor: Audi A4 (B5)

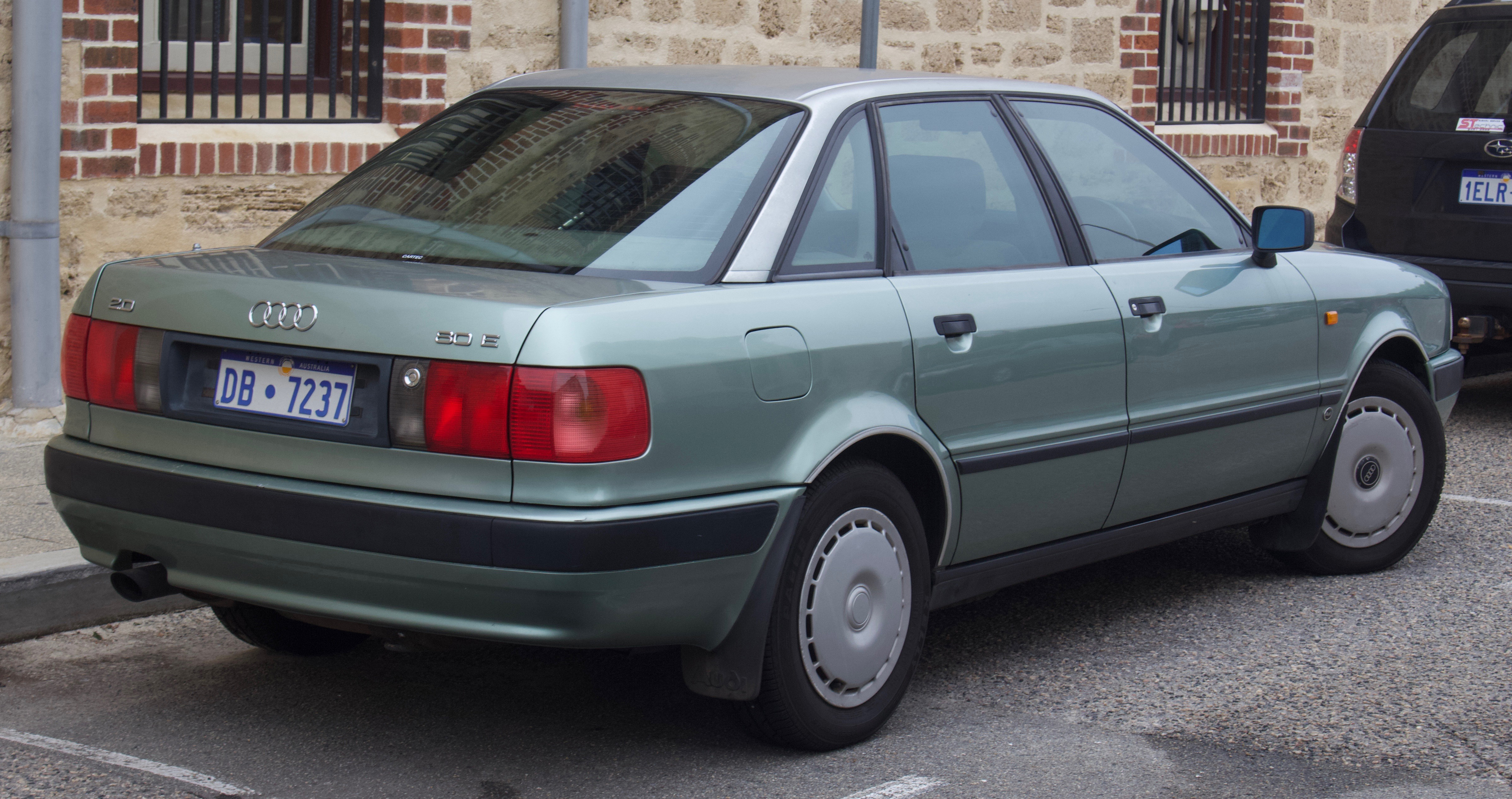
Saloon

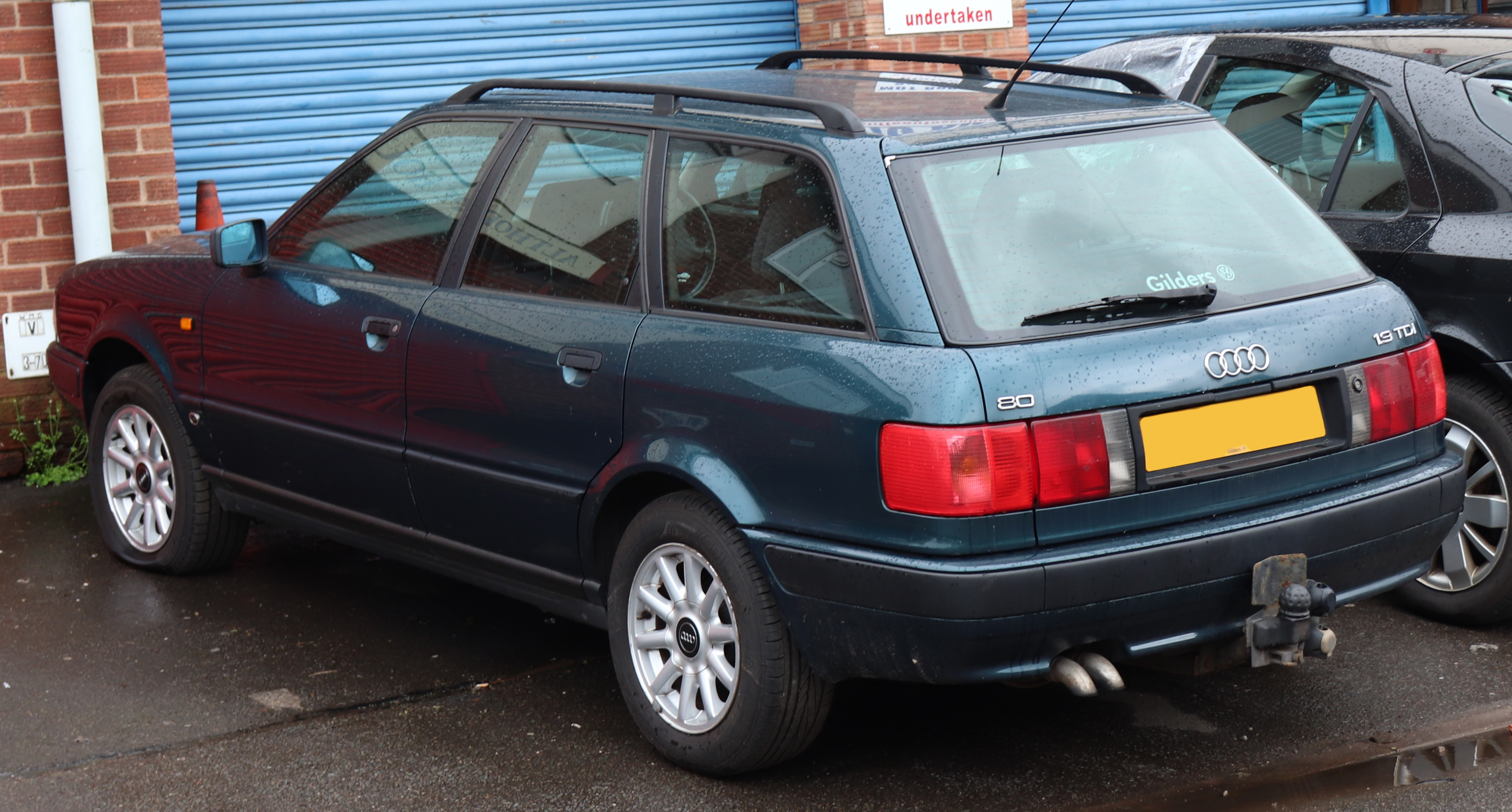
Avant

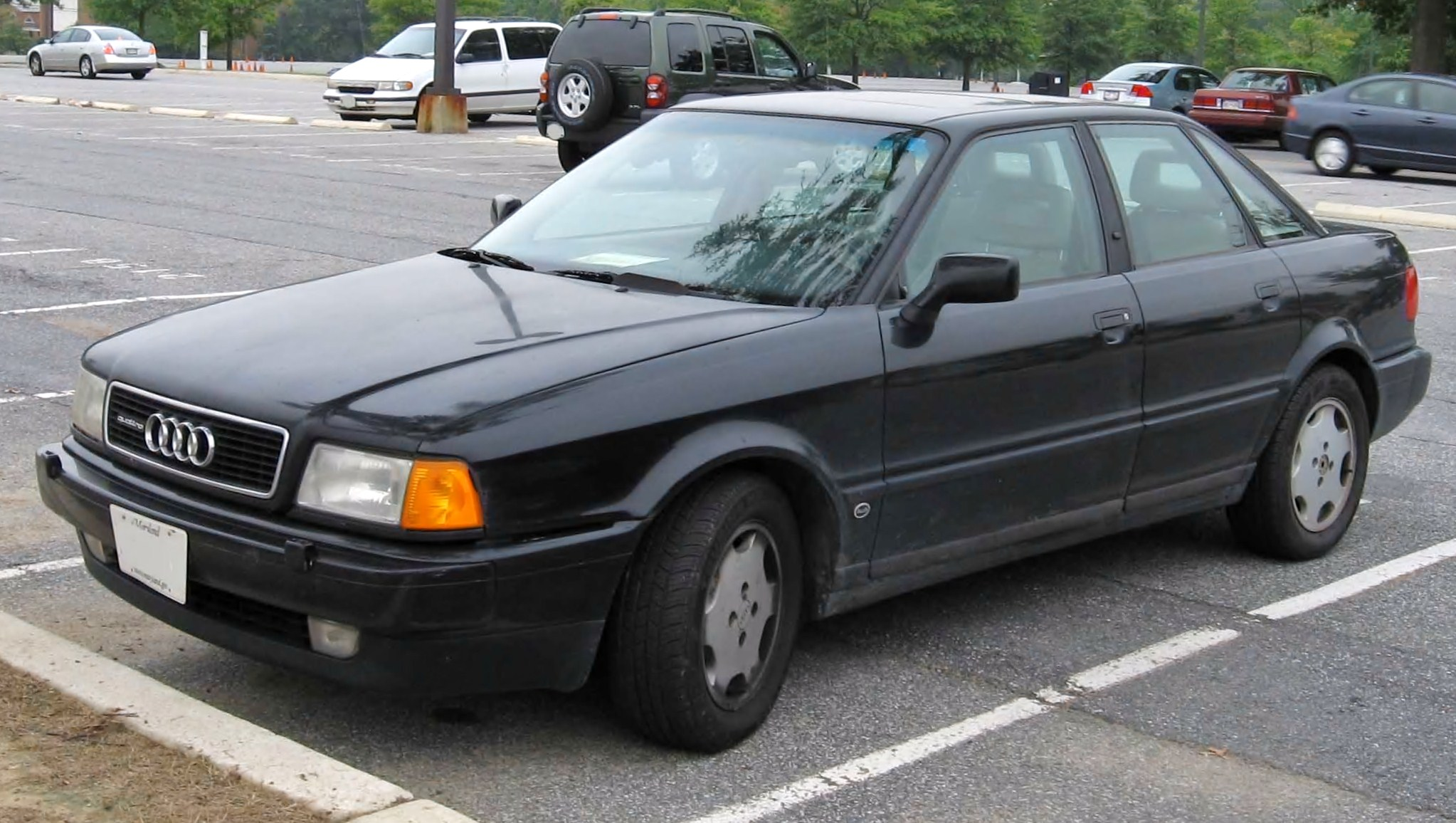
Audi 90

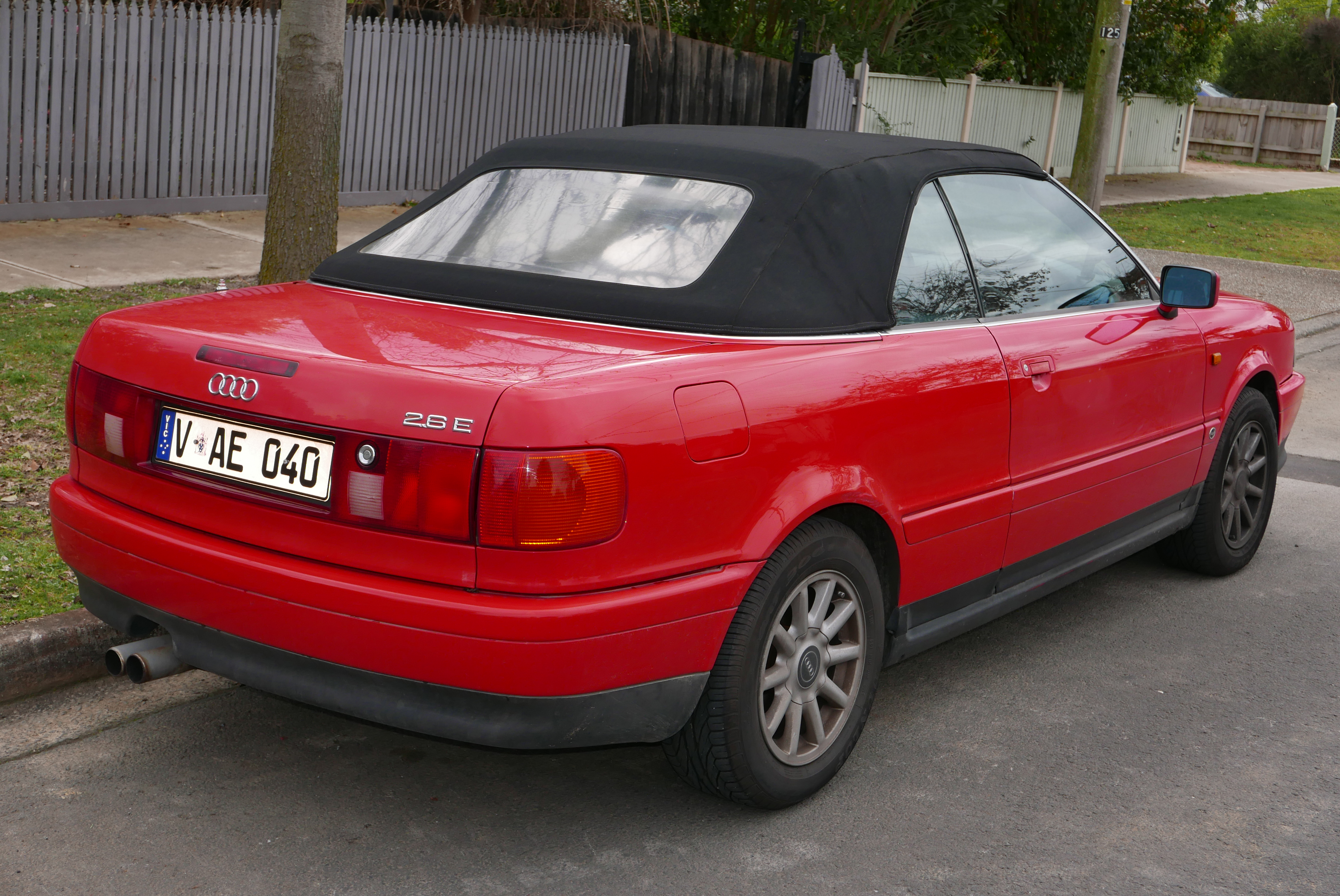
The contemporary Audi Cabriolet was derived from the Audi 80 B3

The Audi 80 (B3) obtained a major facelift in the autumn of 1991, although the UK launch was not until early 1992. From then on it was known internally as the B4 (or Typ 8C). Changes from the B3 included a longer wheelbase, a fully redesigned fuel tank and rear axle to enable the use of folding seats, 15" wheels with more prominent wheel arches, redesigned and painted rear and front bumpers, as well as higher-quality materials for the interior, and a larger boot. The front grille was merged with the bonnet and given a bolder look. This design had been previewed on the 1990 Audi Coupé S2 and was applied to the full lineup of the B3-based Coupés as well in July 1991. The Cabriolet (Typ 8G) had been introduced in May 1991 and continued to be built long after the B4 had been replaced, receiving similar updates to the Audi 80 B4 and succeeding Audi A4.

The B4 also marked the beginning of Audi's move into the German luxury mid-sized vehicle segment, which until then was clearly dominated by Mercedes-Benz and BMW. On the European market, and in Germany in particular, the B4 and its variants were highly successful and popular.

In Europe, the 90 designation for five-cylinder models was dropped for this generation, and all saloons were badged as 80, regardless of which engine they had. Audi of America went the opposite direction, and sold the saloon as the 90. B4s for the American market typically offered more luxury and style even in the standard version, such as automatic transmission, cruise control, air conditioning, and leather seats, all of which were usually optional at additional cost on European models.

Because the United States does not recognise the international ECE Regulations on auto safety components and constructions, but rather maintains its own Federal Motor Vehicle Safety Standards, the front of the B4 had to be specially redesigned for vehicles sold in North America. The front and bumper had to be designed to accommodate impact energy absorbers not required outside North America. Instead of the dual-reflector headlamps, a single-reflector design was used inboard of an amber combination turn signal, parking, and side marker lamp and reflector wrapping around the corner, and fog lamps smaller than the rest-of-world items were placed on the corners of the bumper air duct.

European market cars were now available with a selection of inline four-cylinder engines, as well as the familiar in-line five, and two different new V6 engines (2.6-litre and 2.8-litre); the later 2.8-litre V6 was the only engine available for vehicles sold in North America. As another first, Audi introduced a new high-torque, direct-injection, turbocharged diesel engine, the 66 kW (90 PS; 89 bhp) 1.9-litre TDI (Turbocharged Direct Injection). The standard 1.8-litre petrol engine of the B3 was discontinued; a two-litre, 66 kW (90 PS; 89 bhp), four-cylinder petrol engine, a variation of the previously known 85 kW (116 PS; 114 bhp) 2.0 E engine, was now available for the base model.

Altogether, although some layouts were not available everywhere outside Germany, Audi offered the following engine range for the 80/90 B4:

Petrol engines:

- 1.6 – 52 kW (71 PS; 70 bhp), in-line four-cylinder (export only)
- 1.6 E – 74 kW (101 PS; 99 bhp), in-line four-cylinder
- 2.0 – 66 kW (90 PS; 89 bhp), in-line four-cylinder (base model in Germany)
- 2.0 E – 85 kW (115 PS; 113 bhp), in-line four-cylinder
- 2.0 E 16v – 103 kW (140 PS; 138 bhp), 16-valve, in-line four-cylinder
- 2.3 E 10v – 98 kW (133 PS; 131 bhp), 10-valve, in-line five-cylinder
- 2.6 E – 110 kW (150 PS; 148 bhp), V6
- 2.8 E – 128 kW (174 PS; 172 bhp), V6
- S2 – 162–169 kW (220–230 PS; 217–227 bhp), 2.2 L, 20-valve turbocharged in-line five-cylinder
- RS2 Avant – 232 kW (315 PS; 311 bhp), 2.2 L, 20-valve turbocharged in-line five-cylinder

Diesel engines:

- 1.9 TD – 55 kW (75 PS; 74 bhp), in-line four-cylinder turbodiesel
- 1.9 TDI – 66 kW (90 PS; 89 bhp), in-line four-cylinder direct-injection turbodiesel (with intercooler)

Most petrol versions could be ordered with quattro permanent four-wheel-drive; at the time, however, it could only be combined with a five-speed manual transmission. Additionally, Audi built around 2,500 units of the Quattro Competition for the German and European market. It was a street homologation of the B4-based Super Tourenwagen Cup (STW) race car saloon with four-wheel drive and a modified 140 PS (138 hp; 103 kW), 16-valve, two-litre petrol engine. The powertrain had its roots in the two-litre, four-cylinder inline engines that most European Audi 80s were equipped with at the time. On the outside, the Quattro Competition featured the same bumpers as the S2, the V6 headlights, and a rear wing mounted on the bootlid.

Together with the saloon, Audi produced a B4-based estate, the Audi 80 Avant, and a convertible, the Audi Cabriolet, which was largely based on the B3 Coupé. This meant that Audi now had saloon, coupé, cabriolet, and estate variants of the 80 available to European customers. For the North American market, however, Audi only sold coupés during the 1990 and 1991 model years, and the estate was never officially available.

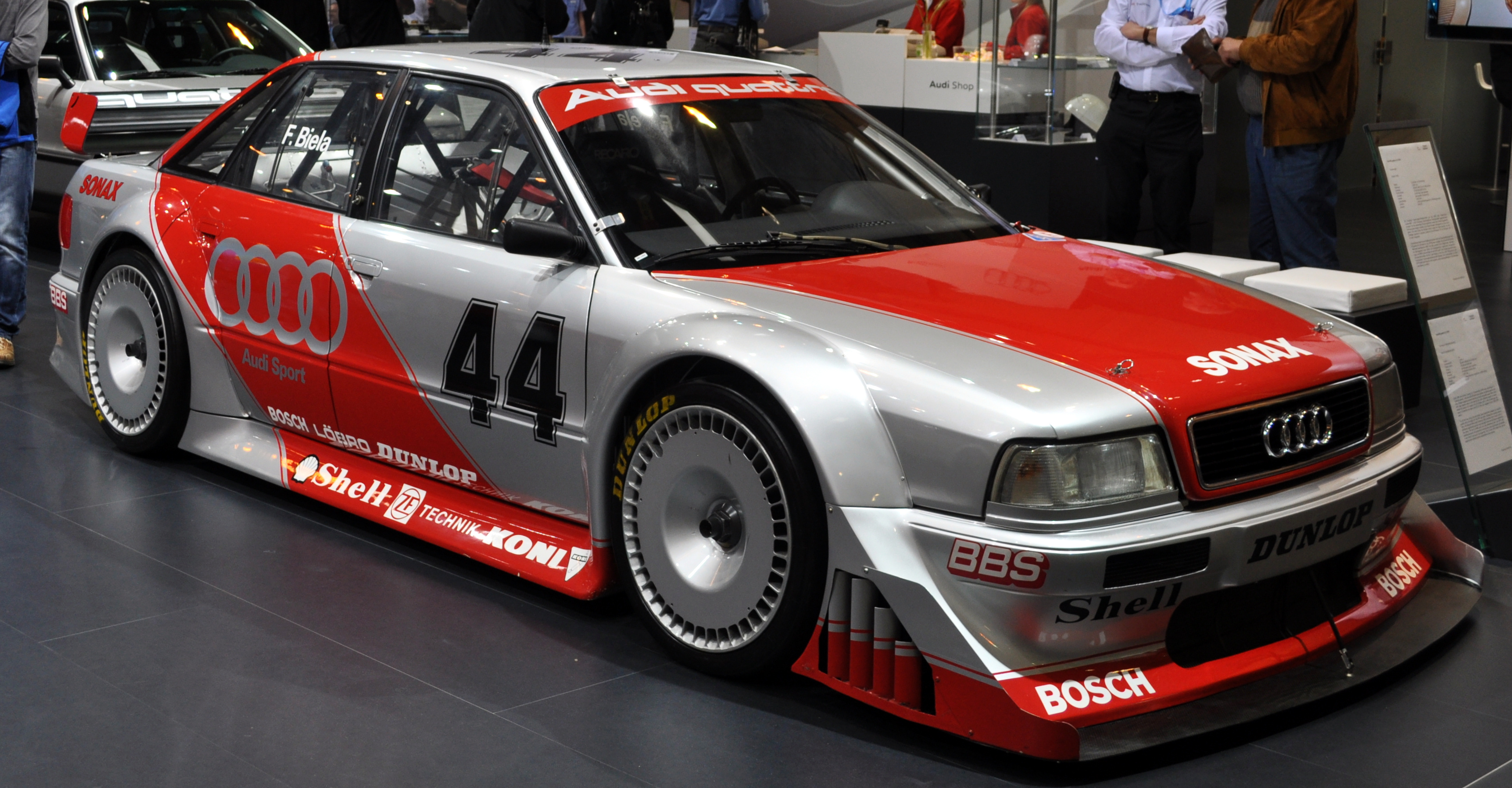
Audi 80 unraced DTM prototype

As of the 1994 model year, a limited edition model, known as Europa, was introduced on the European market. It could be ordered both as a saloon and an Avant. It was factory-equipped with power mirrors, alloy wheels, rear seat headrests, an airbag steering wheel, and offered a choice between power sunroof or air conditioning. It came in five different special colours. For "regular" 1994 B4 saloons and Avants, standard features as well as options available were stepped up too, including an airbag steering wheel and redesigned door liners (standard), and passenger airbags and a built-in engine immobiliser (optional).

The 80-series was effectively replaced by the new Audi A4 in 1994, a variant of the 1996 (B5) Volkswagen Passat. By that time it was feeling very dated in comparison with more modern rivals such as the BMW E36. Production ceased at a time when prestige European manufacturers were making the transition of older executive saloons to newer models based on newer platforms in the compact executive car market.

The B4 saloon was discontinued at the end of the 1994. The Avant was axed in 1995, and the Coupé (with no immediate replacement) followed suit in 1996. The Cabriolet, however, continued in production until August 2000. The B4 platform saloon was replaced by the Audi A4 for the 1995 model year (1996 in North America), followed by a new A4 Avant later in 1996. A mid-sized convertible was not available again until 2002, when the A4 Cabriolet was introduced. Since 2007, Audi has produced Audi A5 - which is similar in concept to the old 80-based Coupé.

=== Audi S2 ===
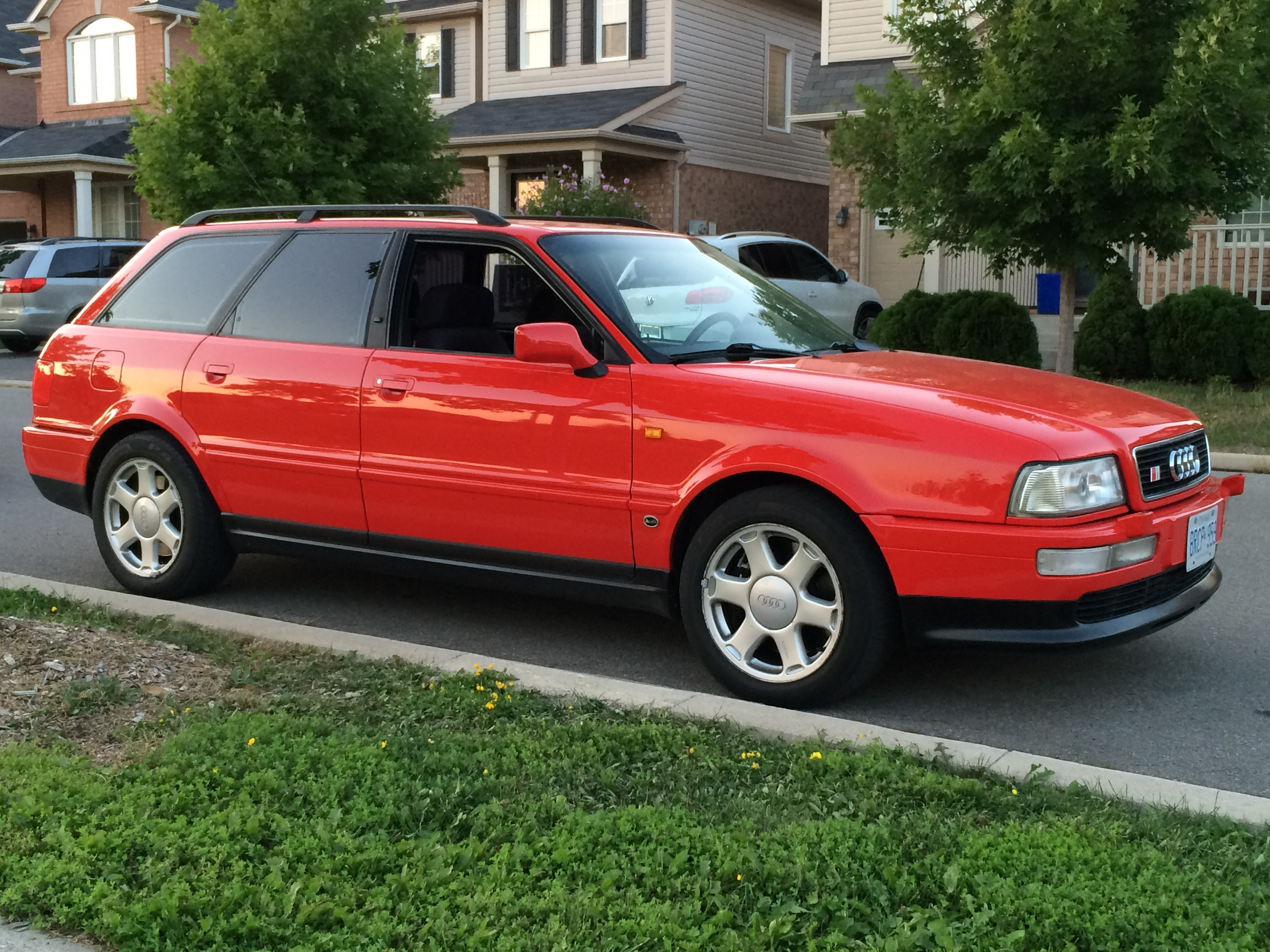
Audi S2 Avant

Audi developed a sports version of the Coupé in 1990, called the Audi Coupé S2. This replaced the famous Audi Quattro and was capable of 150 mph. In 1993, the S2 received some cosmetic updates, including new AVUS-style alloy wheels, ellipsoid beam (projector) headlamps, and clear front indicator lenses. This coincided with the introduction of the five-door S2 Avant, along with a limited run of four-door S2 sedan models, of which 306 were produced. The S2 saloon and Avant feature a lot of similarities in the rear axle support system to the later B5 A4 quattro. The B4 platform S2 Avant was also used between 1993 and 1995 as the basis for Audi's RS2 Avant super-sports estate, which was modified for Audi with assistance from Porsche.

=== Audi RS2 Avant ===
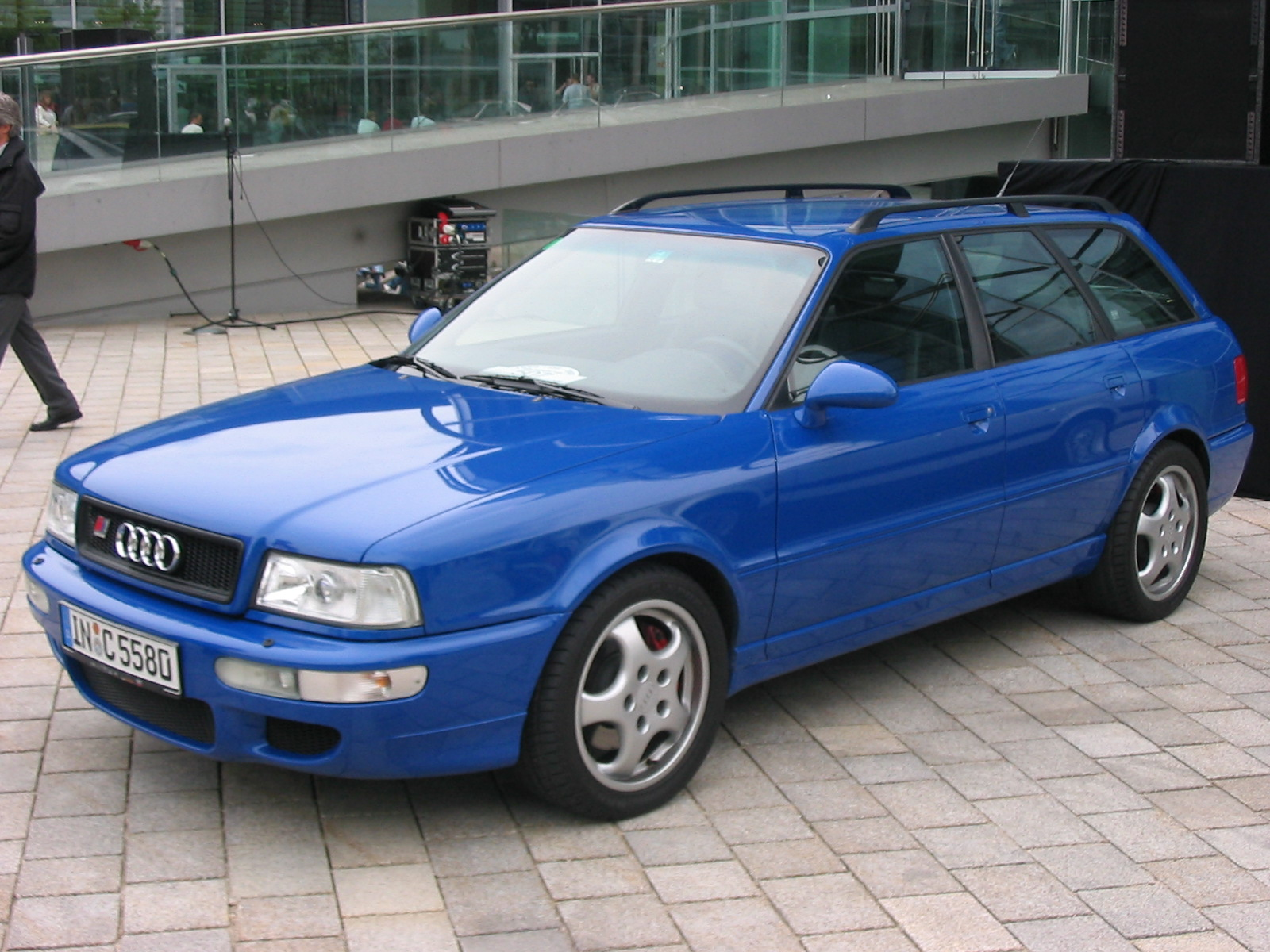
Audi RS2 Avant

The Audi RS2 Avant is fitted with a similar 2.2-litre turbocharged engine to the S2, but producing 232 kW (315 PS; 311 hp). It can accelerate from 0–100 km/h (0–62 mph) in 4.8 seconds and has a top speed of 262 km/h (163 mph).

The Audi RS2 was generally only available as an Avant, although four 4-door saloon models were officially produced by the factory, including one for the chief of the RS2 development programme. The RS2 was at least partially assembled at the Porsche Rossle-Bau plant in Zuffenhausen. Prior to manufacturing the RS2, the Porsche Zuffenhausen assembly line was busy producing the high-performance W124 bodystyle Mercedes-Benz 500E. The RS2/Porsche link is further exemplified by the RS2's dual circuit Porsche braking system (wearing Brembo calipers with a Porsche name), 7.0Jx17" alloy wheels that were identical in design to the Porsche 911 Turbo wheels of that era, and side view mirrors are also borrowed from the Porsche 911 Turbo. Additionally, the word "PORSCHE" is inscribed in the RS2 factory emblems affixed to the tailgate and front grille, and on the engine's inlet manifold. Porsche modified the Avant S2 body optics, added more power, better brakes, bigger anti-roll bars to front and rear, fine tuned the interior – and a super-sports estate was born. Porsche's involvement in the project was on the strict understanding that a coupé model would not be produced, as this was felt to be too close to Porsche's own products.

Petrol
Model	Cylinder	Bore × stroke	Displ.	Compression Ratio	Rated power (DIN 70020)	Max. Torque (DIN 70020)	Engine code	0–100 km/h (0–62 mph)	Top speed	Construction period
1.6 (Note: Only for export.)	4	81 mm × 77.4 mm	1595 cc	9:1	52 kW (71 PS; 70 hp) at 5400 rpm	120 N⋅m (89 lbf⋅ft) at 3000 rpm	ABM	15.4 s	162 km/h (101 mph)	01/1992–08/1994
1.6 E	4	81 mm × 77.4 mm	1595 cc	10.5:1	74 kW (101 PS; 99 hp) at 6000 rpm	130 N⋅m (96 lbf⋅ft) at 3200 rpm	ADA	Unknown	189 km/h (117 mph)	06/1993–12/1995
2.0	4	82.5 mm × 92.8 mm	1984 cc	8.9:1	66 kW (90 PS; 89 hp) at 5400 rpm	148 N⋅m (109 lbf⋅ft) at 3000 rpm	ABT	13.6 s	177 km/h (110 mph)	09/1991–12/1995
2.0 E (Note: All-wheel-drive (quattro) was available as a factory option.)	4	82.5 mm × 92.8 mm	1984 cc	10.4:1	85 kW (116 PS; 114 hp) at 5400 rpm	166 N⋅m (122 lbf⋅ft) at 3200 rpm	ABK	11.8 s	190 km/h (120 mph)	09/1991–12/1995
2.0 E 16V	4	82.5 mm × 92.8 mm	1984 cc	10.8:1	103 kW (140 PS; 138 hp) at 5800 rpm	181 N⋅m (133 lbf⋅ft) at 4500 rpm	ACE	9.6 s	201 km/h (125 mph)	08/1992–12/1995
2.3 E	5	82.5 mm × 86.4 mm	2309 cc	10:1	98 kW (133 PS; 131 hp) at 5500 rpm	186 N⋅m (137 lbf⋅ft) at 4000 rpm	NG	9.8 s	200 km/h (120 mph)	09/1991–11/1994
2.6 E	6	82.5 mm × 81.0 mm	2598 cc	10:1	110 kW (150 PS; 148 hp) at 5750 rpm	225 N⋅m (166 lbf⋅ft) at 3500 rpm	ABC	9.3 s	212 km/h (132 mph)	07/1992–12/1995
2.8 E	6	82.5 mm × 86.4 mm	2771 cc	10.3:1	128 kW (174 PS; 172 hp) at 5500 rpm	245 N⋅m (181 lbf⋅ft) (Note: With "Super Plus" petrol (98 RON): 250 N⋅m (184 lbf⋅ft)) at 3000 rpm	AAH	8.0 s	220 km/h (140 mph)	09/1991–12/1995
S2 (Note: All-wheel-drive was a default option.)	5	81.0 mm × 86.4 mm	2226 cc	9.3:1	169 kW (230 PS; 227 hp) at 5900 rpm	350 N⋅m (258 lbf⋅ft) at 1950 rpm	ABY	5.9 s	248 km/h (154 mph)	02/1993–12/1995
RS2 Avant	5	81.0 mm × 86.4 mm	2226 cc	9.3:1	232 kW (315 PS; 311 hp) at 6500 rpm	410 N⋅m (302 lbf⋅ft) at 3000 rpm	ADU	5.4 s	262 km/h (163 mph)	03/1994–05/1995

Diesel
Model	Cylinder	Bore × stroke	Displ.	Rated power (DIN 70020)	Max. Torque (DIN 70020)	Engine code	0–100 km/h (0–62 mph)	Top speed	Construction period
1.9 TD	4	79.5 mm × 95.5 mm	1896 cc	55 kW (75 PS; 74 hp) at 4400 rpm	140 N⋅m (103 lbf⋅ft) at 2200–2800 rpm	AAZ	17.5 s	162 km/h (101 mph)	09/1991–07/1995
1.9 TDI	4	79.5 mm × 95.5 mm	1896 cc	66 kW (90 PS; 89 hp) at 4000 rpm	182 N⋅m (134 lbf⋅ft) at 2300 rpm (Note: Starting from model year 1994: 202 N⋅m (149 lbf⋅ft) at 1900 rpm.)	1Z	14.1 s	174 km/h (108 mph)	09/1991–07/1995

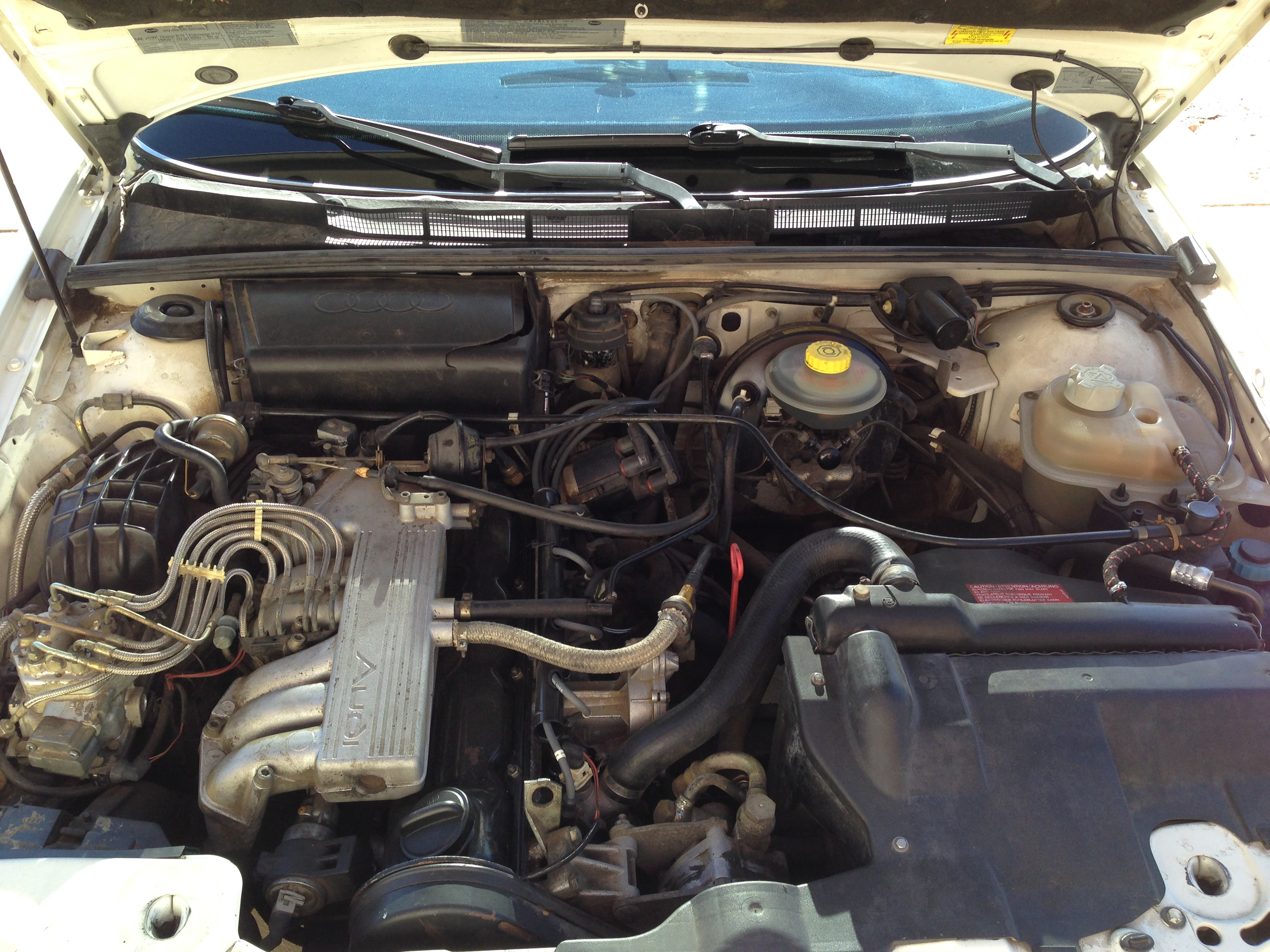
10V-five-cylinder (MKB: NG)

== Type codes ==
Audi assigned its individual models "Typ" codes, in addition to the primary Volkswagen Group B platform codes:

- F103 – Audi 80 (1966–1969)
- Typ 80 – B1; Audi 80 (1972–1976)
- Typ 82/33 – B1; Audi 80 (1976–1978)
- Typ 81 – B2; Audi 80/90 (4000 in US) (1979–1987); Audi Coupé (1980–1987)
- Typ 85 – B2; Audi Coupé quattro (1984–1988); Audi Quattro (1981–1991); Audi 80/90/4000 quattro (1984–1987); Audi Sport Quattro (1984–1987)
- Typ 89/8A – B3; Audi 80/90 (1986–1992)
- Typ 89Q – B3; Audi 80/90 quattro (1986–1992)
- Typ 8B – B3; Audi Coupé (1989–1996); Audi S2 (1991–1996)
- Typ 8C – B4; Audi 80 (1992–1995); Audi RS2 Avant (1994–1996)
- Typ 8G – B4; Audi Cabriolet (1991–2000)

== Motorsport ==
The Audi 90 is best known for its heavy dominance in the IMSA GT Championship under the IMSA GTO category as well as in the Trans Am Series in the late eighties. The manufacturer almost entered the 1993 DTM, but withdrew prior to the season, and only one Audi 80 DTM car was ever produced.

The Audi 80 did compete in Super Touring racing beginning in 1993, when Frank Biela competed in the 1993 French Supertouring Championship. The model was used in 1994 in the German Super Tourenwagen Cup, but by 1995 was replaced by the then-new Audi A4.

== See also ==
- Audi Coupé/Cabriolet
- Audi RS2 Avant

== Works cited ==
- Oswald, Werner (2001), Deutsche Autos 1945–1990 [German cars 1945-1990] (in German), vol. 4, Motorbuch Verlag, pp. 263–274, ISBN 978-3-613-02131-0
