= Audi S4 =

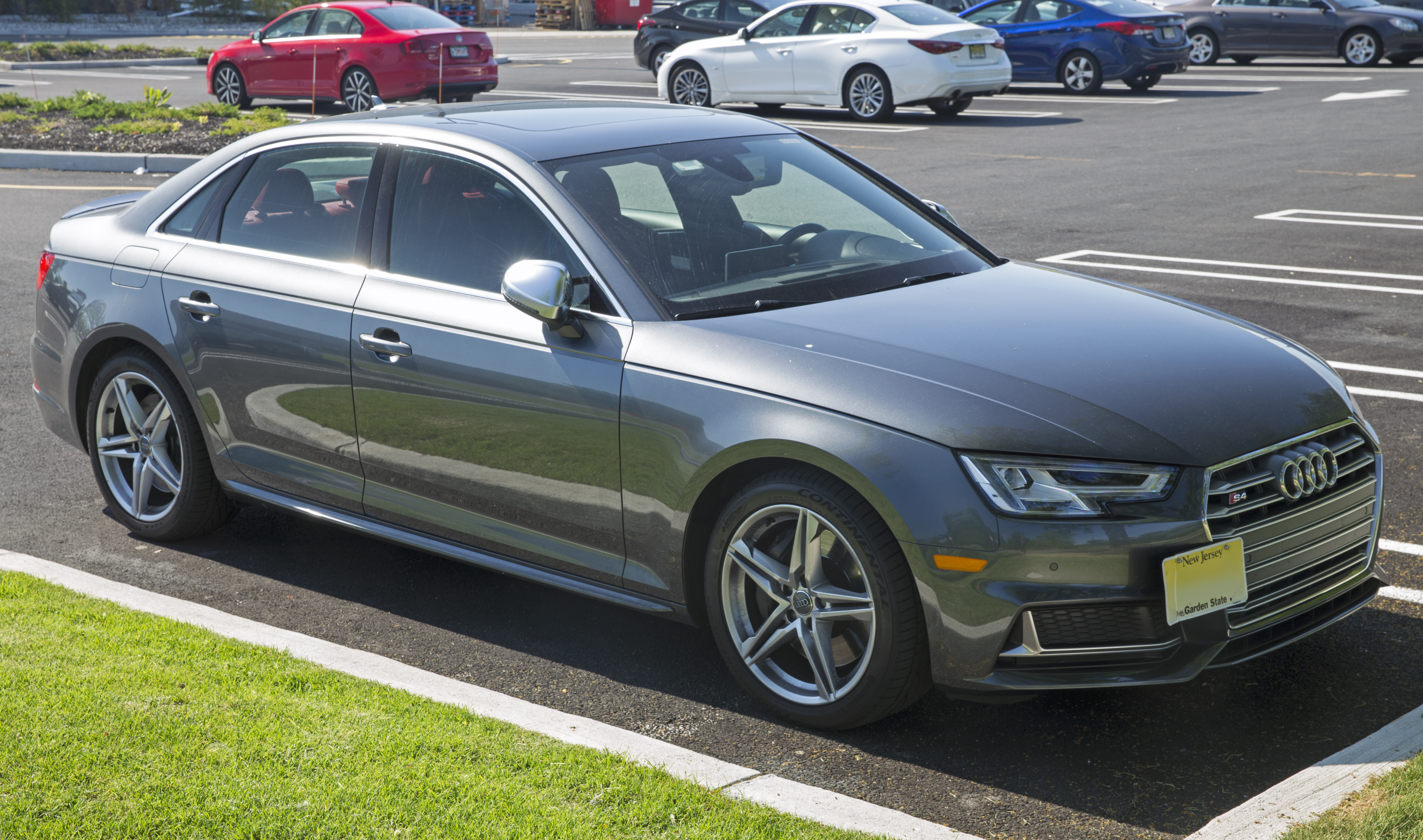
- Audi S4 (B9) sedan (front view, United States)

Overview
- Manufacturer: Audi AG
- Production: 1991–1994 1997–2025

Body and chassis
- Class: Compact executive car (D)
- Layout: F4 layout
- Related: Audi A4; Audi RS 4

The Audi S4 is the high performance variant of Audi's compact executive car A4. The original Audi S4, built from 1991 until 1994, was a performance-oriented version of Audi's 100 saloon/sedan. All subsequent S4s, beginning with the "B5" platform car in 1997, have been based on the Audi A4; and as the A4 has evolved from one generation to the next, so has the S4. Audi's platform generation names, beginning with "B5" in 1997, are used throughout to distinguish between generations/evolutions of these products.

Like its regular A4 counterpart, all S4 variants have had longitudinally oriented, front-mounted engines. All versions of the S4 have their transmission mounted immediately at the rear of the engine in a longitudinal orientation, in the form of a transaxle, and like all Audi "S" cars, are only available as standard with Audi's quattro all-wheel drive (AWD) system, using a Torsen-based centre differential system. A more powerful internal combustion engine, larger upgraded brakes, firmer suspension, larger wheels, and distinctive sheetmetal, styling cues and badging have always been amongst the many upgrades the S4 receives over its mainstream 100 and A4 siblings. In markets where the even higher-performance and further-visually-differentiated Audi RS 4 is not offered, the S4 is the top-of-the-line trim of the A4 family.

A single turbocharged 2.2-litre inline five-cylinder powered the original C4 version, and a 2.7-litre twin turbocharged V6 engine was found in the B5 generation. The B6 and B7 versions shared a common 4.2-litre V8 engine, the first time that a V8 engine was placed in a compact executive car, placing it in direct competition with the BMW M3 (3.2 L inline 6) and Mercedes-Benz C32 AMG (3.2-litre supercharged V6). The B8 generation uses a supercharged 3.0-litre V6 TFSI engine and competed with the BMW 335i, BMW 335i/340i xDrive, and Mercedes-Benz C350. The current B9 generation is powered by a turbocharged 3.0-litre V6 TFSI engine, with rivals including the BMW M340i xDrive and Mercedes-Benz C450 AMG/Mercedes-AMG C43 4MATIC.

All versions of the S4 have been manufactured at Audi's plant in Ingolstadt, Germany; they are, or have been available as a four-door five-seat saloon and a five-door five-seat Avant (Audi's name for an estate car/station wagon) body styles since the model's inception in 1991. A two-door four-seat Cabriolet (convertible) S4 variant was introduced as part of the B6 and B7 generation A4 lineups. The B8 Cabriolet has now been built off the A5 coupe body style and the "S" variant is marketed under the Audi S5 nameplate.

== C4 (Typ 4A, 1991–1994) ==
First generation (C4/4A)
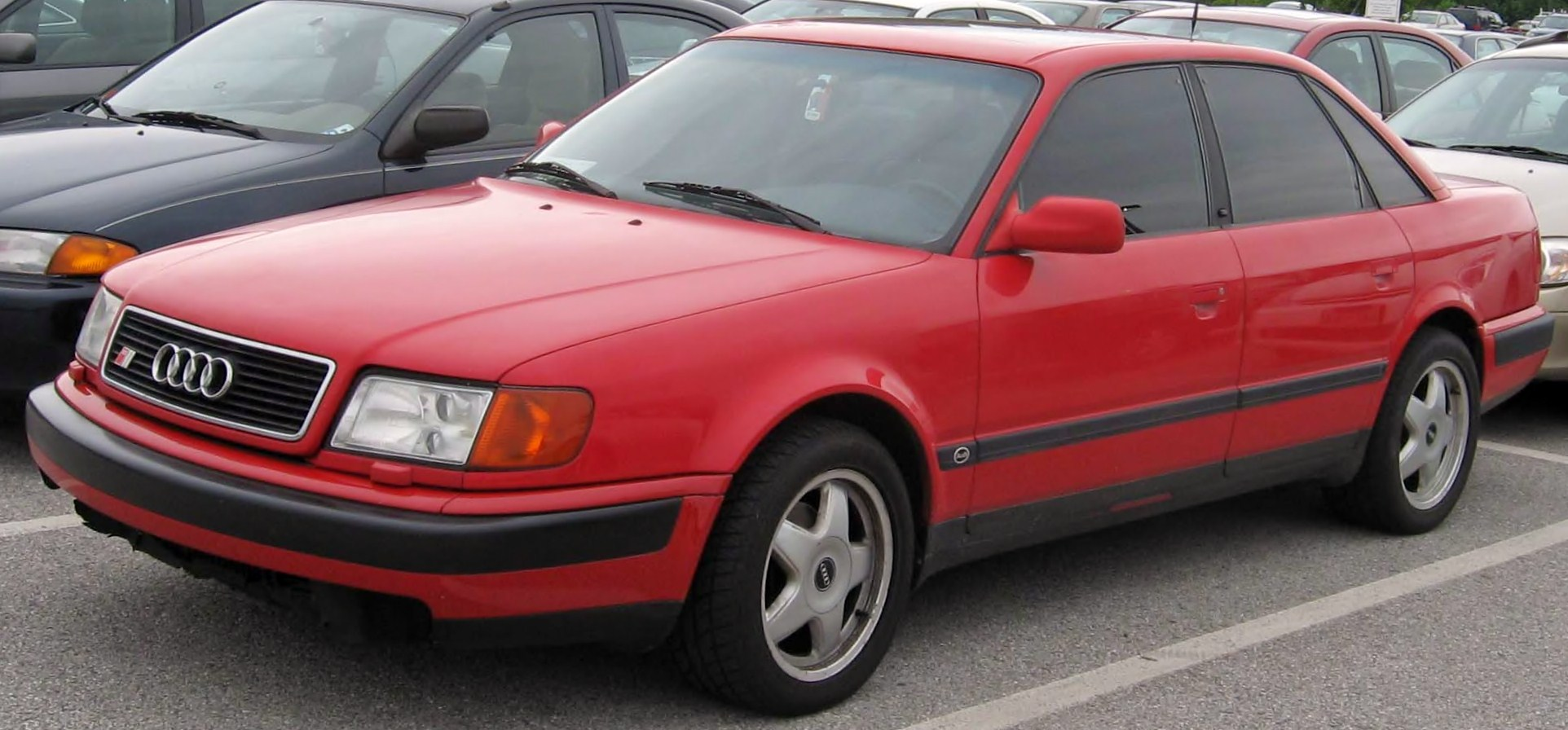

Overview
- Also called: "Ur-S4"
- Production: August 1991–July 1994
- Assembly: Germany: Neckarsulm

Body and chassis
- Body style: 4-door saloon/sedan 5-door estate/wagon (Avant)
- Platform: Volkswagen Group C4
- Related: Audi C4 100; Audi C4 A6; Audi C4 S6

Powertrain
- Engine: 2.2 L AAN 20V DOHC turbo I5 (08/91-07/94); 4.2 L ABH 32V DOHC V8 (10/92-07/94)
- Transmission: 5-speed manual 6-speed manual 4-speed automatic

Dimensions
- Wheelbase: 2,692 mm (106.0 in)
- Length: 4,790–4,982 mm (188.6–196.1 in)
- Width: 1,803 mm (71.0 in)
- Height: 1,443 mm (56.8 in)
- Kerb weight: saloon: 1,730 kg (3,814 lb) estate: 1,780 kg (3,924 lb)

Chronology
- Successor: Audi C4 S6, Audi B5 S4

Factory production of the original Audi S4 (Typ 4A), usually known as Audi 100 S4, began in August 1991 to serve as the performance version of the newly updated, C4 platform, 100-series four-door, five-seat saloon. First shown to the public at the May 1991 Barcelona Show, it was designed to replace the outgoing C3-based Audi 200 turbo quattro 20V and retained its five-cylinder engine. The 200, Audi's first true sports-saloon, had been discontinued at the end of 1990. Being the first S4 model from Audi, it is commonly referred to as the Ur-S4, derived from the German: Ursprünglich augmentive word (meaning: original).

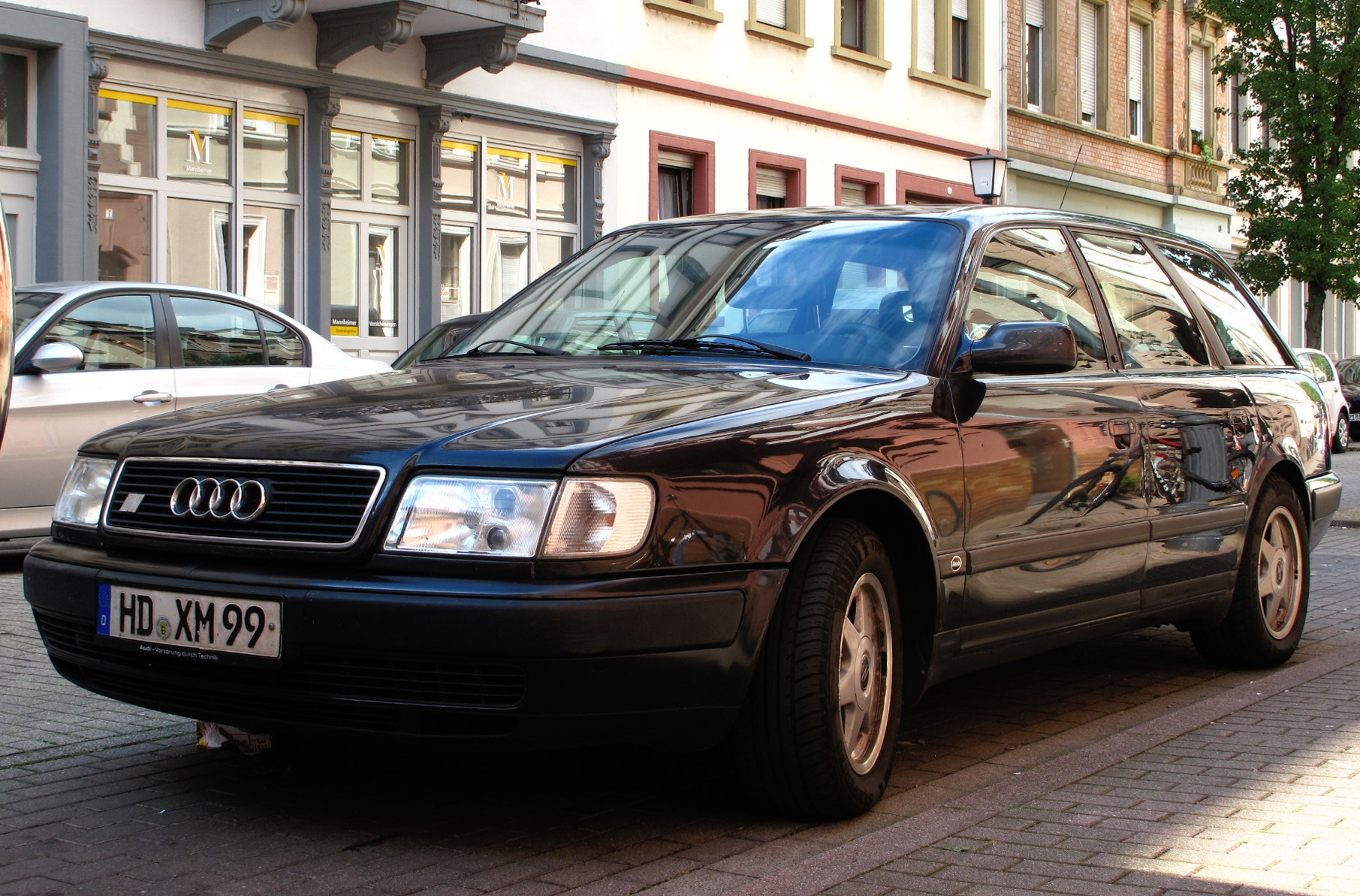
Audi S4 Avant (C4)

Audi mildly updated the C4-based model line in 1994 and dropped the 100 nomenclature; all variants of the former Audi 100 line were now re-badged as the Audi A6. In line with the switch in model name, Audi temporarily discontinued the use of the S4 name and began selling an updated but fundamentally identical version of the car, based on the "new" A6 and badged as S6. Despite the change in name, differences between the outgoing S4 and incoming S6 were cosmetic and very light.

An all-new C5-based Audi A6 debuted for 1997, after which the S4 and S6 became distinctly separate models based on very different platforms.

The C4 variant S4 ended factory production after less than three years in July 1994.

One of its most renowned owners was Ayrton Senna who owned a silver Avant, not least because he was the Audi distributor for Brazil.

=== C4 powertrain ===
In standard form, the powertrain detail of the C4-based S4 was available with only one engine, a single turbocharged and intercooled version of Audi's 2.2-litre 20-valve inline five-cylinder engine This displaced 2,226 cc (135.8 cu in) and was equipped with an advanced Bosch Motronic electronic engine control unit (ECU). This engine (parts code prefix: 034, identification code: AAN), developed a motive power output of 169 kW (230 PS; 227 bhp) at 5,900 rpm and 350 N⋅m (258 lbf⋅ft) of torque at 1,950 rpm. With the five-speed manual transmission, it was able to accelerate from 0-100 km/h (62 mph) in 6.2 seconds.

Both five- and six-speed manual transmissions (parts code prefix: 01E, identification codes: five-speed: CBD, CET, six-speed: CBL, CMG) were offered to European customers, but a five-speed manual was the only transmission available in North America; a four-speed automatic transmission (parts code prefix: 01F, identification code: CBF) was available as an option worldwide. Front and rear axle final drive ratio is either 4.111 or 3.889 (dependent on transmission type), and the rear axle (parts code prefix: 017, identification codes: AAT, AET) uses a driver-selectable electro-pneumatic-mechanical switchable diff lock.

Audi's quattro four-wheel-drive system was standard on the C4 S4/S6; a first-generation Torsen-based system which used the "T-1" automatically biasing centre differential (ATB) was used.

S4/S6 models equipped with a 4.2-litre 206 kilowatts (280 PS; 276 bhp) all-aluminium alloy V8 engine (parts code prefix: 077, identification code: ABH) became available to European customers as an option from October 1992, only with the six-speed manual gearbox, in either saloon or Avant body styles.

=== C4 steering, brakes, wheels & tires ===
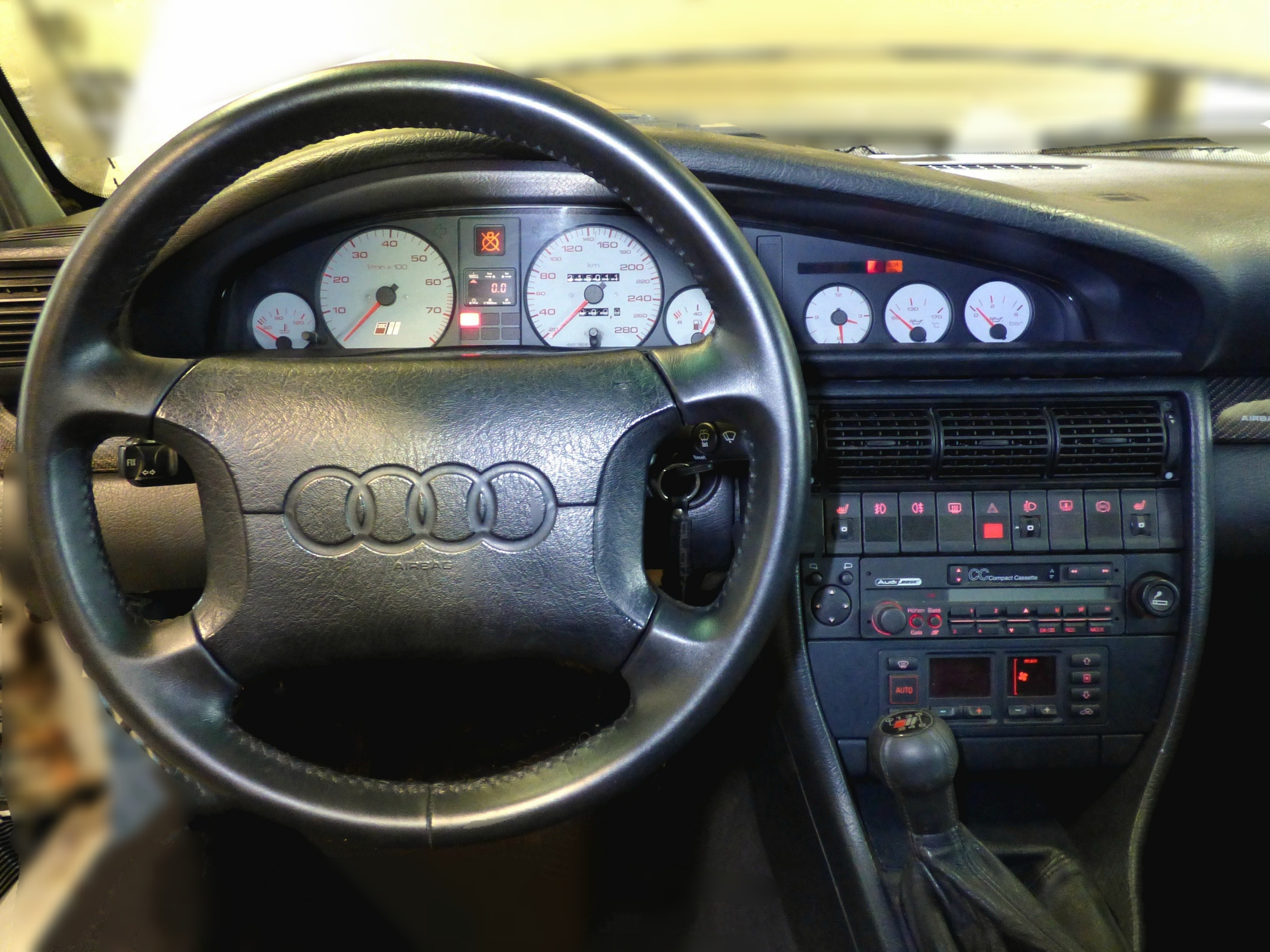
C4 S4 interior

All C4 S4s' came equipped as standard with a conventional fixed-assistance rack and pinion power assisted steering (PAS) system. An electronically controlled 'servotronic' system, which varied the level of assistance in accordance with the road speed, was available as an option.

There were two different types of high performance brake systems on offer for the C4 S4. All S4s' initially had 310 mm (12.20 in) diameter by 25 mm (0.984 in) thick, radially ventilated disc brakes up front, each with an ATE single-piston sliding caliper inside a 'UFO' styled bell-shaped disc. With the introduction of the V8 engine, a new front brake setup became standard; again the discs used radial ventilation, but these front discs were now sized at 314 mm (12.36 in) by 30 mm (1.181 in) - with a conventionally mounted Lucas-Girling caliper in an external position over the disc. US models had smaller 276 mm (10.87 in) discs. The rear brakes, 269 mm (10.59 in) by 20 mm (0.787 in) and also radially ventilated - remained the same throughout C4 production; they used a Lucas-Girling single-piston sliding caliper with an integrated cable-actuated handbrake mechanism. A Bosch three-channel operation (four-channel sensing) Anti-lock Braking System (ABS) with a mechanical load sensing valve for the rear brakes was standard throughout production.

For wheel options, the standard five-arm "Fuchs" forged alloy wheels were 8.0Jx16H2 ET40, and were fitted with 225/50 R16 sized tyres. Several other tyre and wheel designs were optionally available: a 7.5Jx15H2 ET40 six-spoke with 215/60 R15 tyres, an 8.0Jx16H2 ET40 five-double-spoke, a 7.5Jx16H2 ET35 six spoke "Avus", and an 8.0Jx17H2 ET40 ten-spoke.

== B5 (Typ 8D, 1997–2002) ==
Second generation (B5/8D)
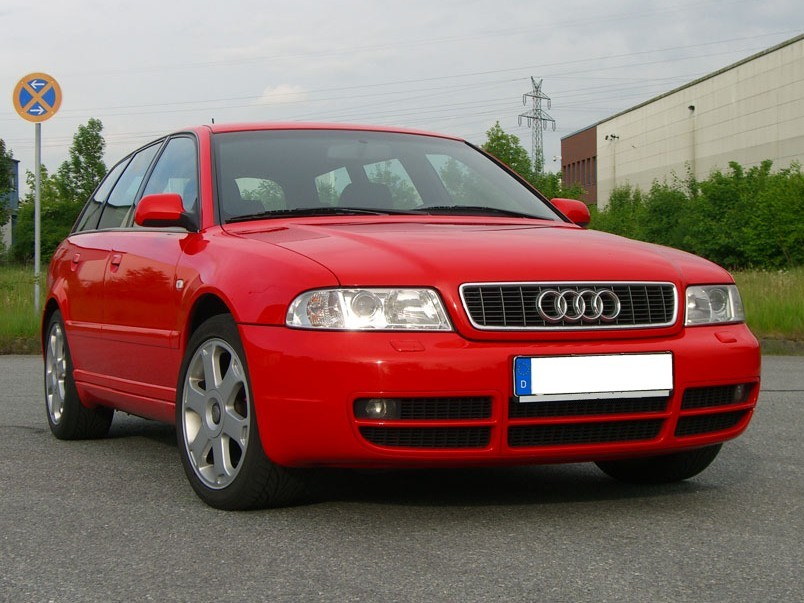

Overview
- Production: October 1997–September 2001
- Assembly: Germany: Ingolstadt

Body and chassis
- Body style: 4-door saloon/sedan 5-door estate/wagon (Avant)
- Platform: Volkswagen Group B5
- Related: Audi B5 A4; Audi B5 RS4

Powertrain
- Engine: 2.7 L V6 30v DOHC 'biturbo'
- Transmission: 6-speed manual, 5-speed ZF 5HP19 tiptronic automatic

Dimensions
- Wheelbase: 2,615 mm (103.0 in)
- Length: 4,483 mm (176.5 in)
- Width: 1997-99: 1,733 mm (68.2 in); 2000-02: 1,848 mm (72.8 in)
- Height: saloon: 1,396 mm (55.0 in); Avant: 1,418 mm (55.8 in)
- Kerb weight: 1,535 kg (3,384 lb) to 1,680 kg (3,704 lb)

Chronology
- Predecessor: Audi C4 S4
- Successor: Audi B6 S4

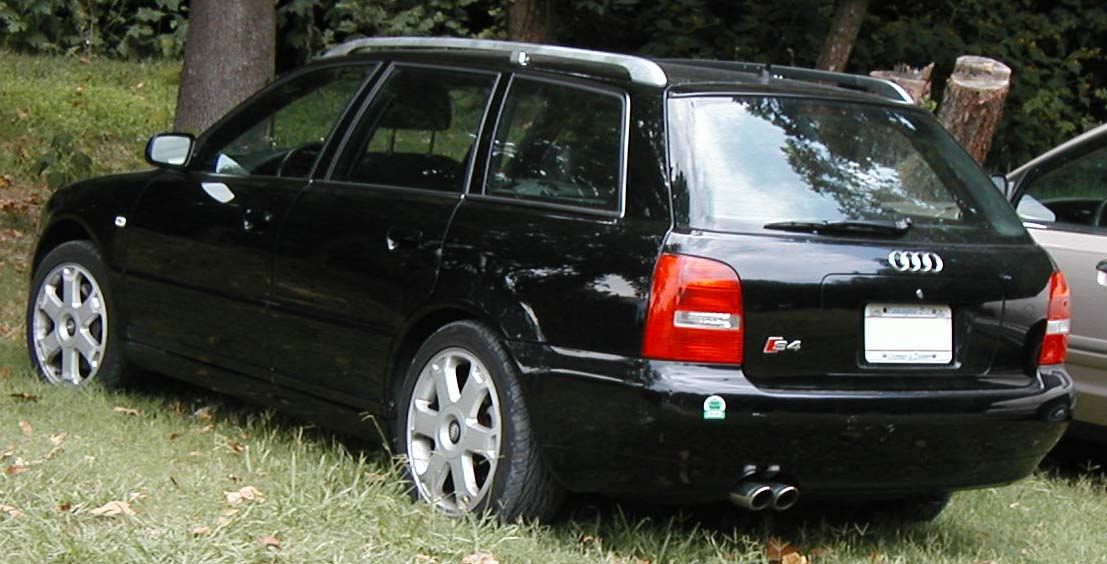
Audi B5 S4 Avant

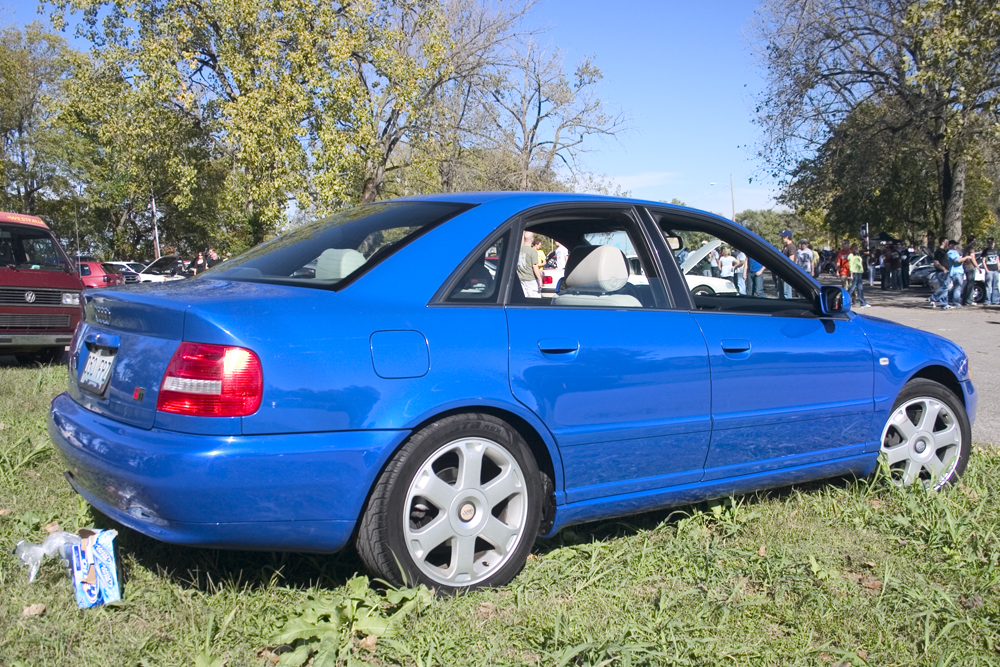
Audi B5 S4 sedan

The second generation S4 (Type 8D), also known as the Audi S4 quattro debuted in 1997, with factory production commencing October 1997, as part of the facelifted B5 platform Audi A4 line-up, although it was not available in North America until late 1999.

In addition to the saloon (sedan), an estate version (wagon)–the Audi S4 Avant–was introduced into the lineup from 1998. Production of the B5 S4 ceased in September 2001, although it was still sold together with the next B6 platform generation through 2002 in North America. Examples produced June 2001 to end of production are 2002 Model Year cars, the 10th digit of the VIN being the number "2".

=== B5 powertrain ===
The powertrain details of the B5 S4 feature a 2.7-litre twin-turbo ('biturbo') 90° third-generation V6 engine (parts code prefix: 078, identification codes: AGB, AZB, APB). Details of the powerplant include a cast iron cylinder block with two lightweight aluminium alloy cylinder heads. The valvetrain includes 30 valves (five valves per cylinder), twin hybrid-driven (timing belt and roller chain) double overhead camshafts and variable valve timing for the inlet valves. The intake air is pressurized by two parallel water-cooled BorgWarner K03-series turbochargers; the charged air is cooled by two side-mounted air-to-air intercoolers (SMICs). It displaces 2,671 cubic centimetres (163.0 cu in), and is rated to produce a motive power output of 195 kW (265 PS; 261 bhp) at 5,800 rpm, and generates 400 N⋅m (295 lbf⋅ft) of torque at 1,850 rpm. Engine management was by way of a Bosch Motronic ME 7.1 (7.0 in North America) electronic engine control unit (ECU), and helped it meet the European EU-3D emissions standard. In all US-market cars, the engine was detuned to meet US emissions regulations; output was reduced to 184 kW (250 PS; 247 hp) and 350 N⋅m (258 lbf⋅ft) (identification code: APB).

As in the previous S4, a six-speed C90 manual transmission (parts code prefix: 01E, identification code: DSY, gear ratios: 1st: 3.500, 2nd: 1.889, 3rd: 1.231, 4th: 0.967, 5th: 0.806, 6th: 0.684) was standard equipment, as was the Torsen T-2 quattro permanent all-wheel drive system. Final drive (parts code prefix: 01H, identification code: DQA) ratio is 4.111. A five-speed ZF 5HP19 tiptronic automatic transmission (parts code prefix: 01V) became available for the first time as an option.

The B5 S4 has a claimed acceleration time from 0 to 100 km/h (0 to 62 mph) of 5.7 seconds, and has an electronically limited top speed of 250 km/h (155 mph), which made it the quickest saloon/sedan in the Audi model line at the time of launch.

=== B5 suspension, brakes, wheels & tires ===
The B5 S4 is fitted with 4-wheel independent suspension. The front suspension is a multi-link design with four individual control arms per wheel. The rear suspension is an unequal length double wishbone design; the lower control arms are mounted to a subframe which also carries the differential housing. Shock absorbers, coil springs, and anti-roll bars are fitted front and rear.

The B5 S4 brake system consisted of radially ventilated discs, 321 mm (12.64 in) in diameter by 30 mm (1.18 in) thick up front, and 256 mm (10.08 in) by 22 mm (0.87 in) at the rear. Two-piston Lucas HP2 brake calipers at the front (with four pads per caliper), with Lucas single-piston sliding brake calipers at the rear. A Bosch ABS 5.3 four-channel Anti-lock Braking System (with Electronic Brakeforce Distribution (EBD) and Electronic Differential Lock (EDL) - Later 2001.5 cars all came with ESP Electronic Stability Program and upgraded tires. The Avant became available as well in North America.

Standard wheels were Audi's die-cast aluminium alloy six-arm 'Avus' 7.5Jx17H2 ET45 wheels, fitted with 225/45 ZR17 performance tyres.

=== B5 colors & optional equipment ===
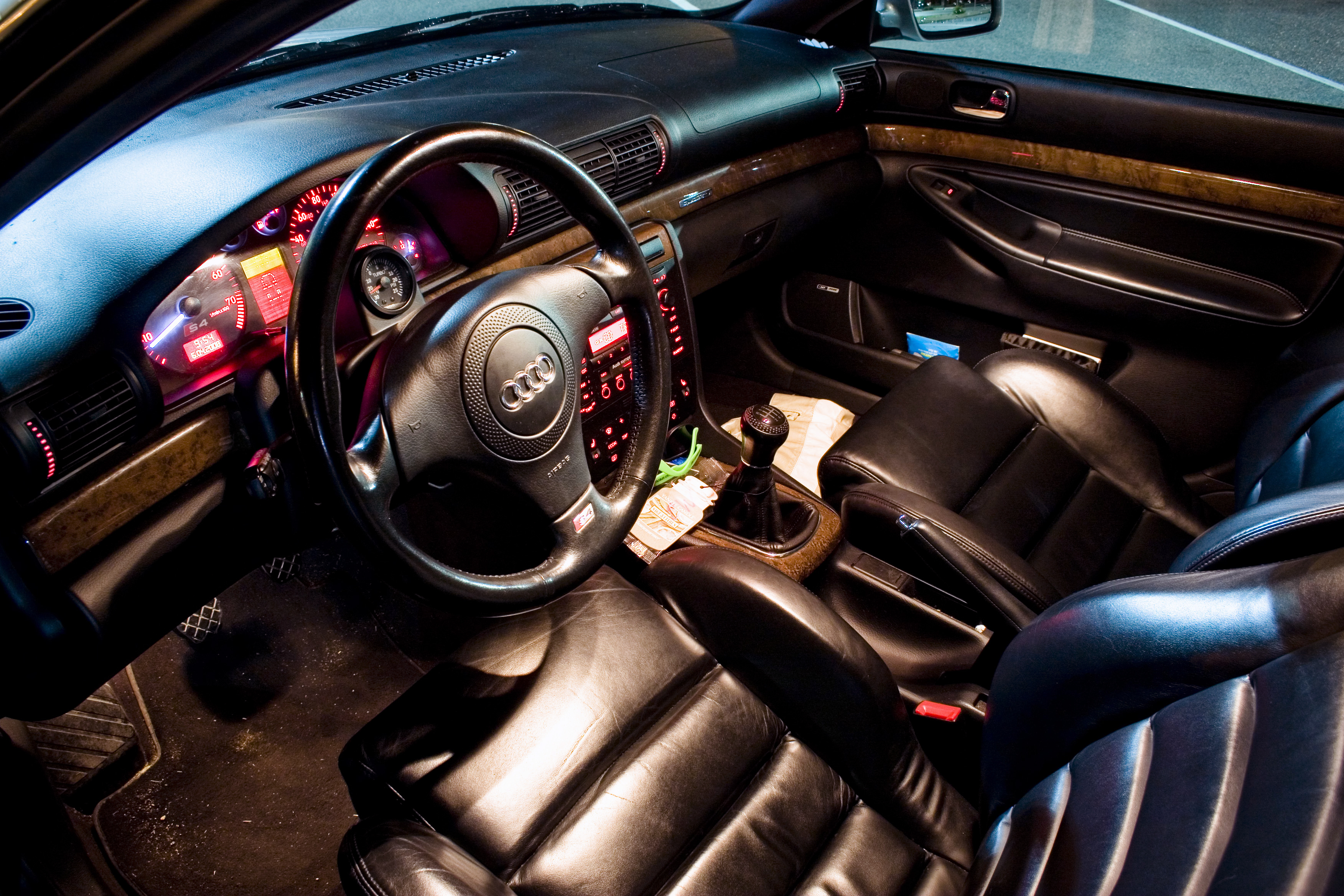
B5 S4 interior

Available exterior colors included; Imola Yellow, Nogaro Blue w/pearl effect. Brilliant Black, Laser Red, Light Silver metallic Cactus Green w/pearl effect, Santorin Blue w/pearl effect, Hibiscus Red w/pearl effect and Casablanca White. The first two colors were exclusive to the S4 model. Solid aluminum mirror housings were standard on later 2001.5+ models. Interior leather was available in Onyx or Silver.

Available options included:

- Bose premium sound system (came stock in most countries)
- Audi Navigation System
- 6-disc CD changer
- Hands free Motorola cellular telephone
- Premium Package: Sunroof, HomeLink transmitter, auto dimming mirrors
- Cold Weather Package: heated front seats, heated outside mirrors, expandable ski sack
- Sport Package (enhanced interior trim)

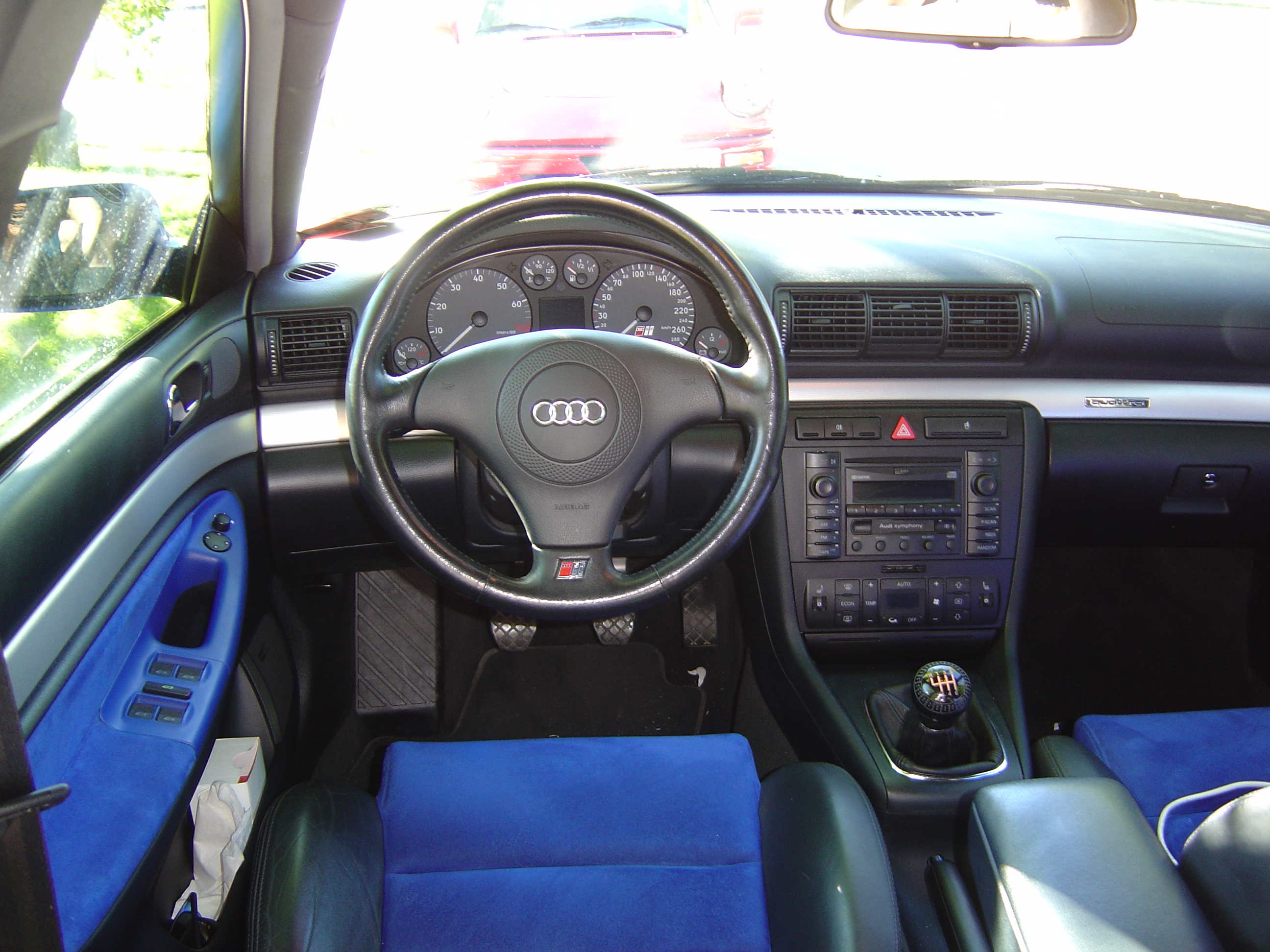
Audi S4 Nogaro blue interior option

Silver or blue Alcantara seat inserts with matching armrests in the door cards was a rare option.

The 'Sport Package' also replaced the wood-grain belt line trim with silver aluminum trim, and the wood grain finish around the shifter surround with black plastic. Carbon fiber trim was also available on some models

On the early 2000 models, the Alcantara inserts in the rear seats did not fully extend forward to the front edge of the seat.

=== B5 motorsport ===
A motor racing version of the car achieved great success in the SpeedVision World Challenge with Michael Galati taking the 2001 SpeedVision GT title in a Champion Racing S4, winning four races, and helping Audi to its first Manufacturers' Championship.

The Audi Sport specification Champion A4 chassis included a B5 RS4 engine, and Alcon racing brake calipers (4 piston front and 2 piston rear calipers).

Don Istook, with Istook's Motorsports, built and campaigned several B5 S4's in first the Motorola Cup, and then the Grand Am Cup. The S4's were even raced by Istook's Motorsports in the Rolex GT category for several races to help fill the field. Of note, one of the S4's, racing against true GT cars, even ran as high as second place (in the rain) at Barber Motorsports Park. These S4's were built using existing S4, not RS4 engines, but used the B5 Audi RS4 K04 turbochargers.

== B6 (Typ 8E/8H, 2003–2005) ==
Third generation (B6/8E/8H)
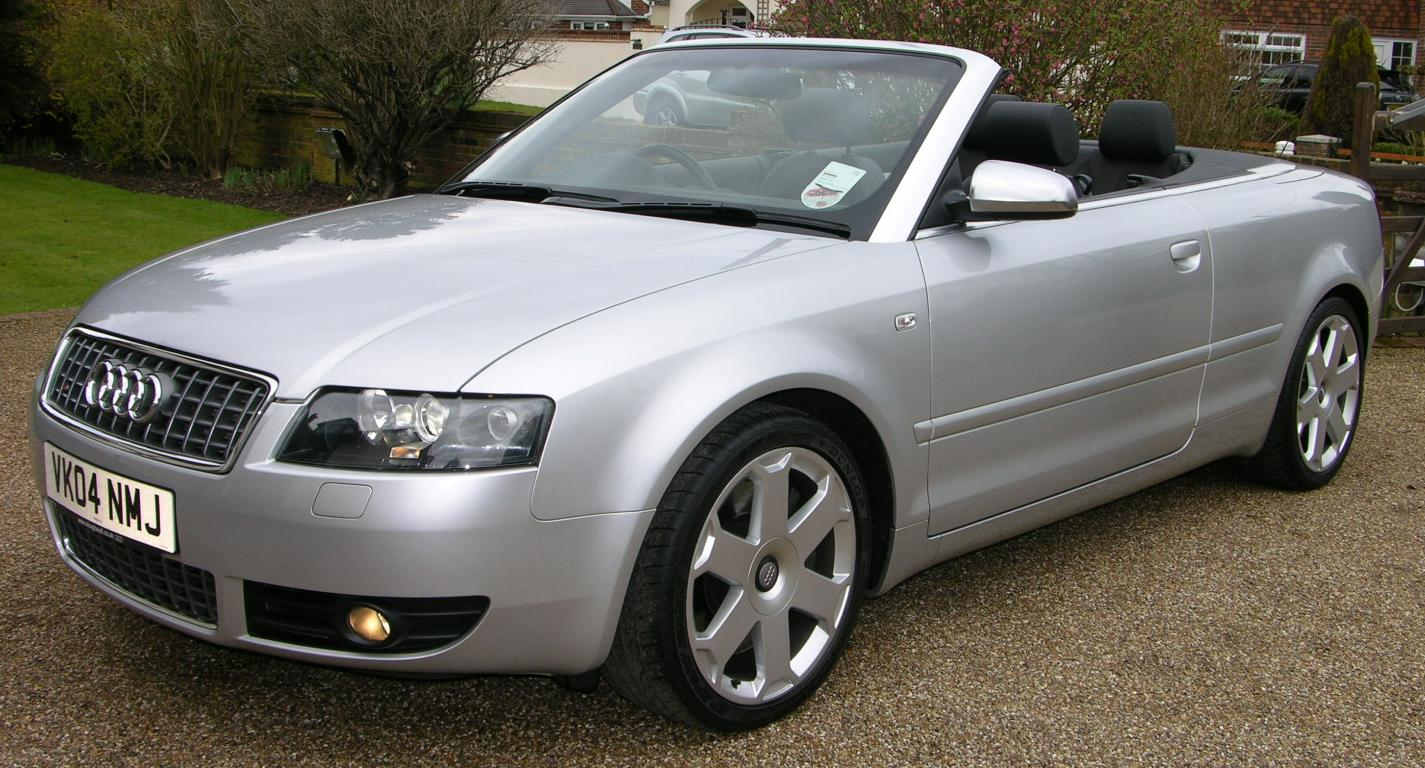

Overview
- Production: Mar 2003–Dec 2004; Feb 2004–Dec 2005 (Cabrio)
- Assembly: Germany: Ingolstadt (Sedan & Avant); Germany: Rheine (Karmann: Cabriolet)

Body and chassis
- Body style: 4-door saloon/sedan, 5-door estate/wagon (Avant), 2-door cabriolet
- Platform: Volkswagen Group B6 (PL46)
- Related: Audi B6 A4

Powertrain
- Engine: 4.2 L V8 40v DOHC
- Transmission: 6-speed Getrag manual, 6-speed ZF 6HP19 tiptronic automatic

Dimensions
- Wheelbase: 2,651 mm (104.4 in), Cabrio: 2,654 mm (104.5 in)
- Length: 4,575 mm (180.1 in), Cabrio: 4,573 mm (180.0 in)
- Width: 1,781 mm (70.1 in), Cabrio: 1,778 mm (70.0 in)
- Height: 1,415 mm (55.7 in), Cabrio: 1,391 mm (54.8 in)
- Kerb weight: saloon: 1,660 kg (3,660 lb) estate: 1,720 kg (3,792 lb) cabriolet: 1,855 kg (4,090 lb)

Chronology
- Predecessor: Audi B5 S4
- Successor: Audi B7 S4

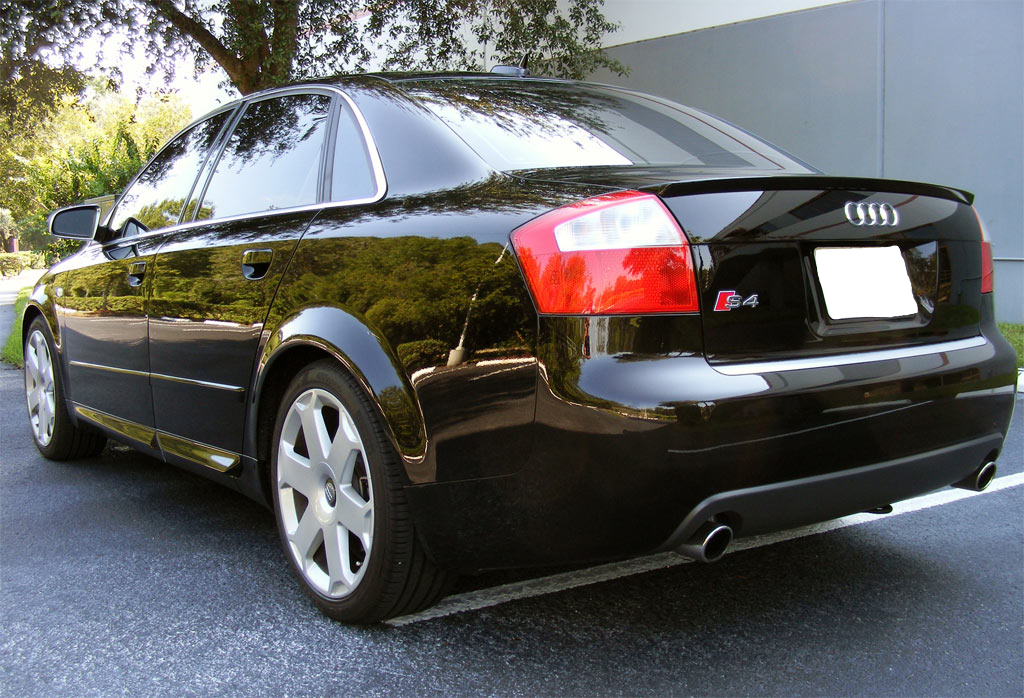
2003–2005 S4 (B6) saloon (US)

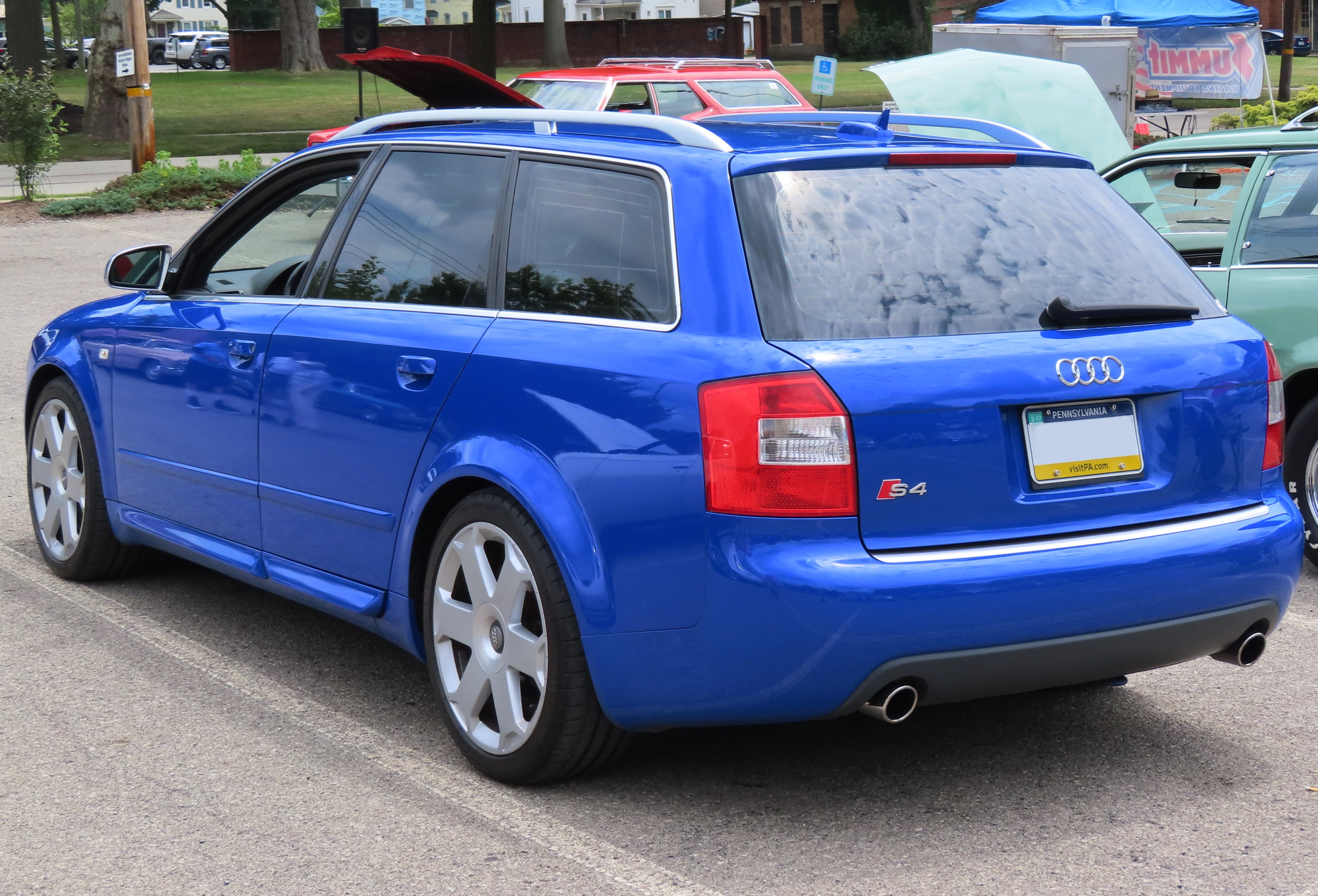
MY2005 Audi S4 (B6) Avant (US)

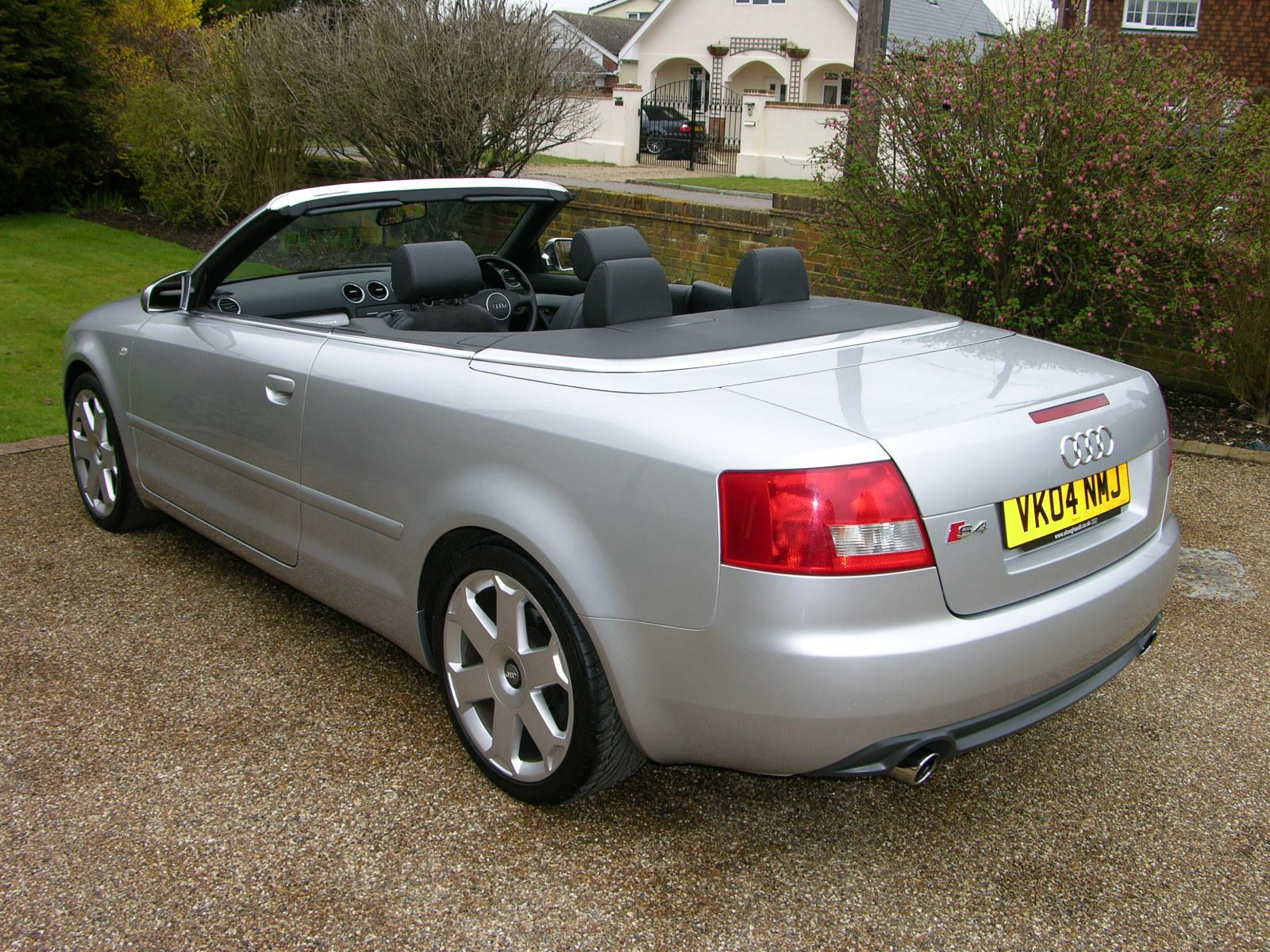
Audi S4 Cabriolet (UK)

The third generation Audi S4 quattro (Type 8E — saloon: 8E2, Avant: 8E5, and Cabriolet: 8H7) debuted its saloon and Avant bodystyles in Europe in March 2003, and appeared in North America slightly later. This was based on the latest Volkswagen Group B6 (PL46) platform used by the then current Audi B6 A4. Despite having moved to an entirely new platform, one of the S4's most publicised new features was its new engine - a 4.2-litre V8 engine. Following its initial launch of either a four-door five-seat saloon (sedan), or a five-door five-seat Avant (estate/wagon), it eventually became available in three bodystyles - and for the first time in the Audi 'S' car range, from February 2004, a two-door four-seat Cabriolet (convertible), Type 8H, was included in the model range.

Official performance figures for 0-100 km/h (62 mph) in the saloon with the manual transmission are 5.6 seconds (Avant 5.8 s, Cabriolet 5.9 s), however, a road test conducted by the American automotive magazine Motor Trend indicated that it could go from a 0-60 mph (97 km/h) in less than 5 seconds, and make it to 200 km/h (124 mph) in slightly over 20 seconds, although doing this led to fuel consumption dipping into single digits. This was considerably worse than the earlier V6 models, leading to the addition of a $1,700 gas guzzler tax (combined 20.2 miles per US gallon (11.6 L/100 km; 24.3 mpg_{‑imp})) for the six-speed manual sedan in the United States. Top speed is electronically limited to 250 km/h (155 mph).

The B6 S4 saloon and Avant variants ceased factory production in December 2004, with the Cabriolet ending twelve months later at December 2005.

=== B6 powertrain ===
Replacing the 2.7-litre 'biturbo' V6 engine of the previous generation B5 S4, the new B6 S4 powertrain gained an all-aluminium alloy 4.2-litre, 40 valve (five valves per cylinder) V8 engine (parts code prefix: 079.C, identification code: BBK), with flywheel-end chain-driven double overhead camshafts, roller-finger rocker arm cam followers, and included variable inlet camshaft timing. It also used a strengthened alloy crankshaft bedplate for the five main bearings, and a two-part baffled oil sump, and a light-alloy variable intake manifold (VIM), containing the fractionally sequentially actuated fuel injectors. This petrol engine, based on the unit from the Audi A8, displaces 4,163 cc (254.0 cu in), and it produces a motive power output of 344 PS (253 kW; 339 bhp) at 7,000 rpm, and generates torque of 410 N⋅m (302 lbf⋅ft) at 3,500 rpm, making it more powerful than the RS2 Avant, and nearly as powerful as the B5 RS4. Engine management was handled by a Bosch Motronic ME 7.1.1 electronic engine control unit (ECU), using a Bosch 'E-Gas' drive by wire electronic throttle, and powering eight individual spark coils with longlife quad-electrode Bosch spark plugs. Ignition timing is a mapped direct ignition, with cylinder-selective knock control with the aid of four knock sensors. The exhaust system includes vacuum-operated valves in the twin rear silencers (mufflers), finished with chrome plated tail-pipes.

Like its predecessors, the B6 S4 was standard with a Getrag six-speed (M6S) manual transmission (parts code prefix: 0A3, identification codes: FVD, HEP) (gear ratios - 1st: 3.667, 2nd: 2.050, 3rd: 1.462, 4th: 1.133, 5th: 0.919, 6th: 0.778), with a 240 mm (9.4 in) single plate dry clutch, and Torsen T-2 quattro permanent four-wheel drive system. Final drive (parts code prefix: 01R, identification code: EXZ) ratios are 3.889, giving a top gear road speed to engine revs ratio of 24.4 miles per hour (39.3 km/h) per 1000 rpm. From July 2003, the ZF 6HP19 tiptronic automatic transmission (parts code prefix: 09L, identification codes: GUR, HHU) (ratios - 1st: 4.171, 2nd: 2.340, 3rd: 1.521, 4th: 1.143, 5th: 0.867, 6th: 0.691, with a final drive (identification code: GDF) ratio of 3.539) was included as an option.

An unusual sight in the engine compartment was the addition of water cooling for the 190 amp alternator, along with two additional thermostatically-controlled side-mounted radiators.

=== B6 steering, brakes, wheels & tyres ===
The B6 S4 came equipped with electronically controlled, variable assisted 'servotronic' rack and pinion power assisted steering (PAS) as standard.

B6 S4 brakes consisted of radially ventilated disc brakes front and rear. The front discs are sized at 345 mm (13.58 in) in diameter by 30 mm (1.181 in) thick, and are clamped by Continental Teves-ATE FNRG-60 single-piston sliding brake calipers. The rears are 300 mm (11.81 in) by 22 mm (0.866 in), and again use single-piston sliding calipers, with an integrated cable-operated hand brake mechanism. A Bosch ESP 5.7 Electronic Stability Programme system, complete with Anti-lock Braking System (ABS), Electronic Brakeforce Distribution (EBD), Emergency Brake Assist (EBA), Electronic Differential Lock (EDL) and Anti-Slip Regulation (ASR) - also known as traction control system, coupled with a dual-rate tandem vacuum servo provided the brake actuation.

Standard wheels were 'Avus-III' die-cast aluminium alloy, 8.0Jx18H2 ET45 in size, and fitted with 235/40 ZR18 95Y XL (eXtra Load) high performance tyres, with factory supplies being either Continental SportContact2 or Michelin PilotSport PS2.

=== B6 body & interior ===
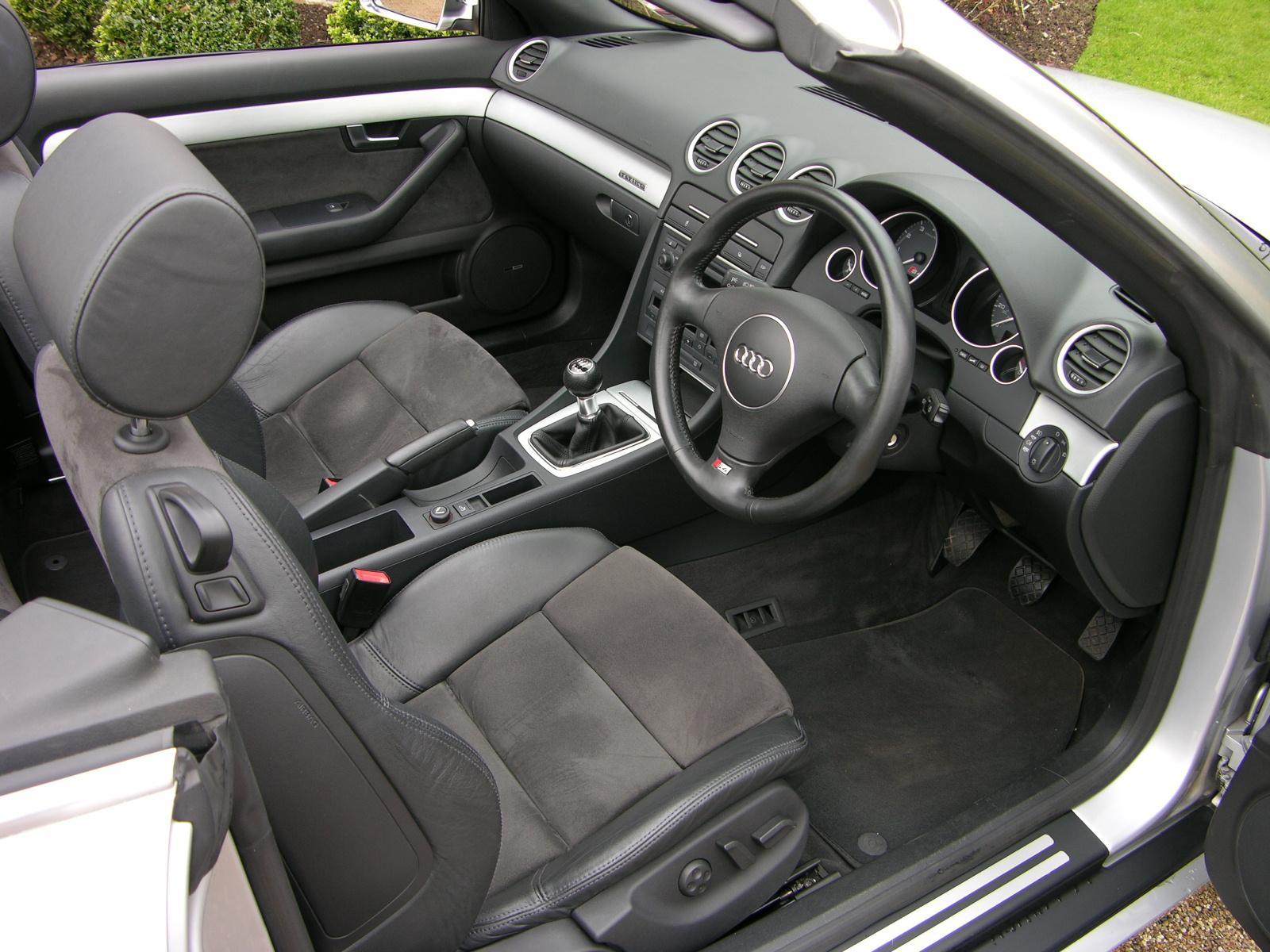
Audi S4 Cabriolet interior

Discrete lower door trims, along with the now trademark Audi 'S' model vertical-emphasis line grille, and solid aluminium (later replaced with plastic covered by aluminium) exterior door mirrors, and S4 badging front and rear are all that visually distinguish the S4 from its related A4 brethren. In the interior, front and rear Recaro seats (fronts fully electric with the option of heated seats), as well as S4 logos in the instrument panel and door sills complete the detail.

== B7 (Typ 8E/8H, 2005–2008) ==
Fourth generation (B7/8E/8H)
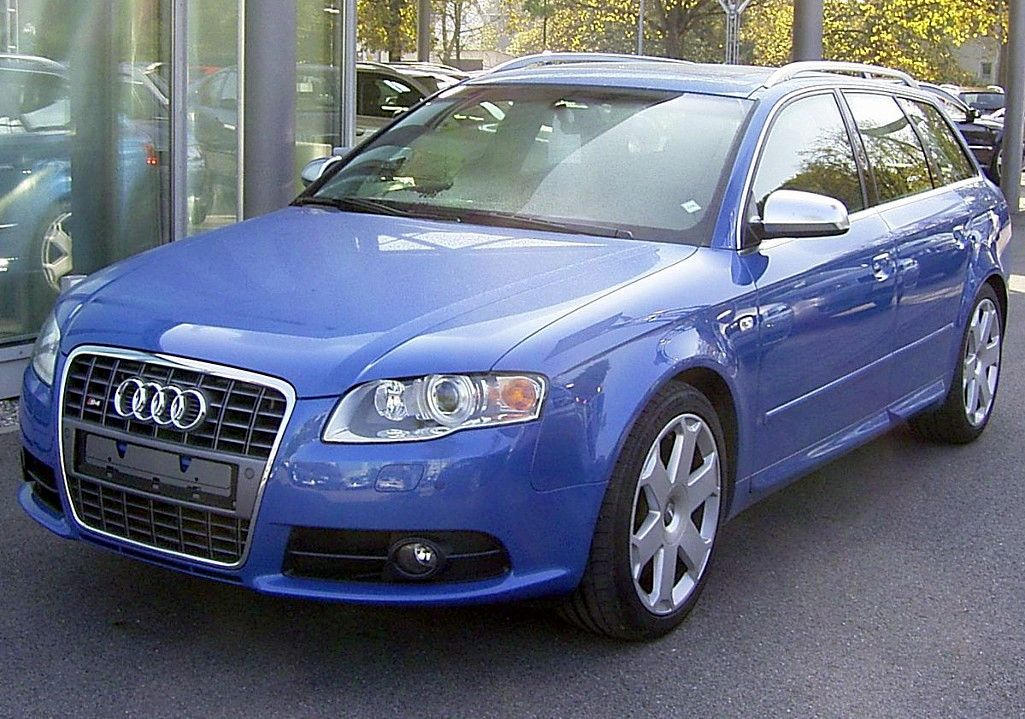
- Audi S4 Avant quattro in Sprint Blue with Avus-III alloy wheels (8ED, Europe)

Overview
- Production: Nov 2004–Jun 2008; Jan 2006–2008 (cabrio)
- Assembly: Germany: Ingolstadt (Sedan & Avant); Germany: Rheine (Karmann: Cabriolet)

Body and chassis
- Body style: 4-door saloon/sedan, 5-door estate/wagon (Avant), 2-door cabriolet
- Platform: Volkswagen Group B7 (PL46)
- Related: Audi B7 A4; Audi B7 RS4; SEAT Exeo

Powertrain
- Engine: 4.2 L V8 40v DOHC
- Transmission: 6-speed Getrag manual, 6-speed ZF 6HP19A tiptronic automatic

Dimensions
- Wheelbase: 2,648 mm (104.3 in); Cabrio: 2,654 mm (104.5 in)
- Length: 4,586 mm (180.6 in); Cabrio: 4,572 mm (180.0 in)
- Width: 1,781 mm (70.1 in); Cabrio: 1,778 mm (70.0 in)
- Height: 1,415 mm (55.7 in); Cabrio: 1,392 mm (54.8 in)

Chronology
- Predecessor: Audi B6 S4
- Successor: Audi B8 S4

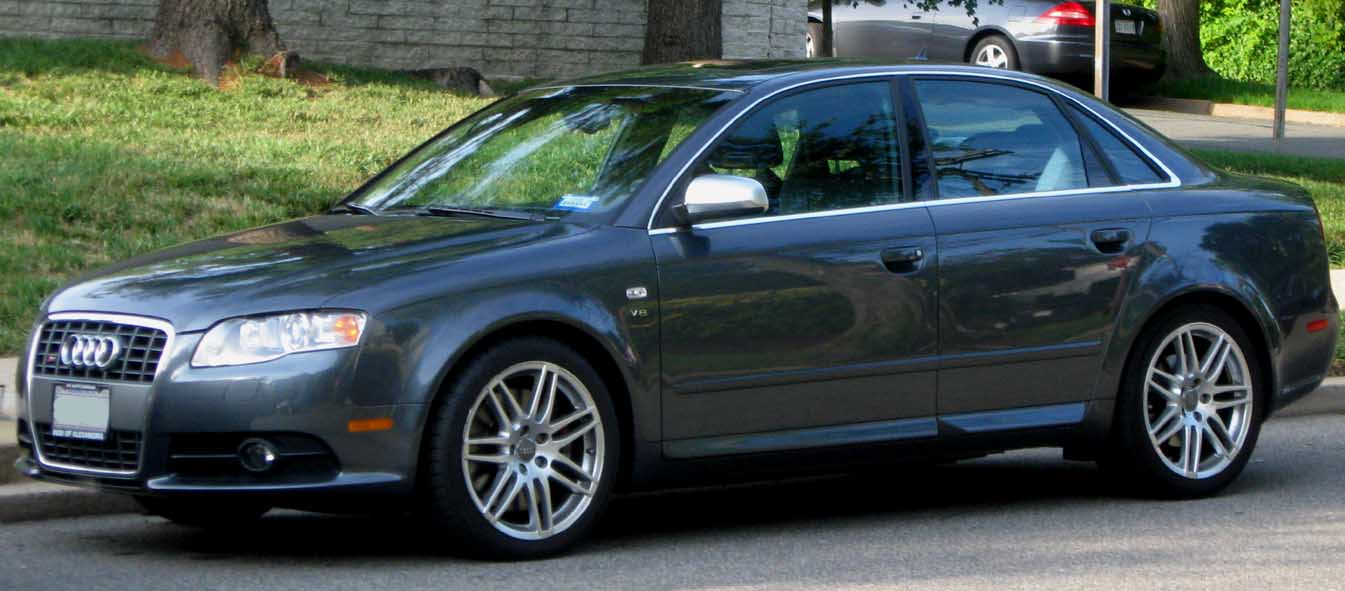
Audi S4 Sedan quattro (8EC, North America)

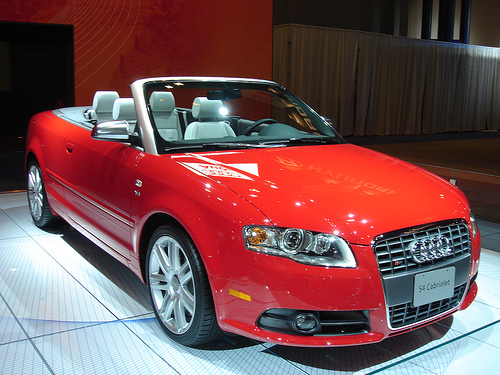
Audi S4 Cabriolet with optional 7-spoke alloy wheels (8HE, U.S.)

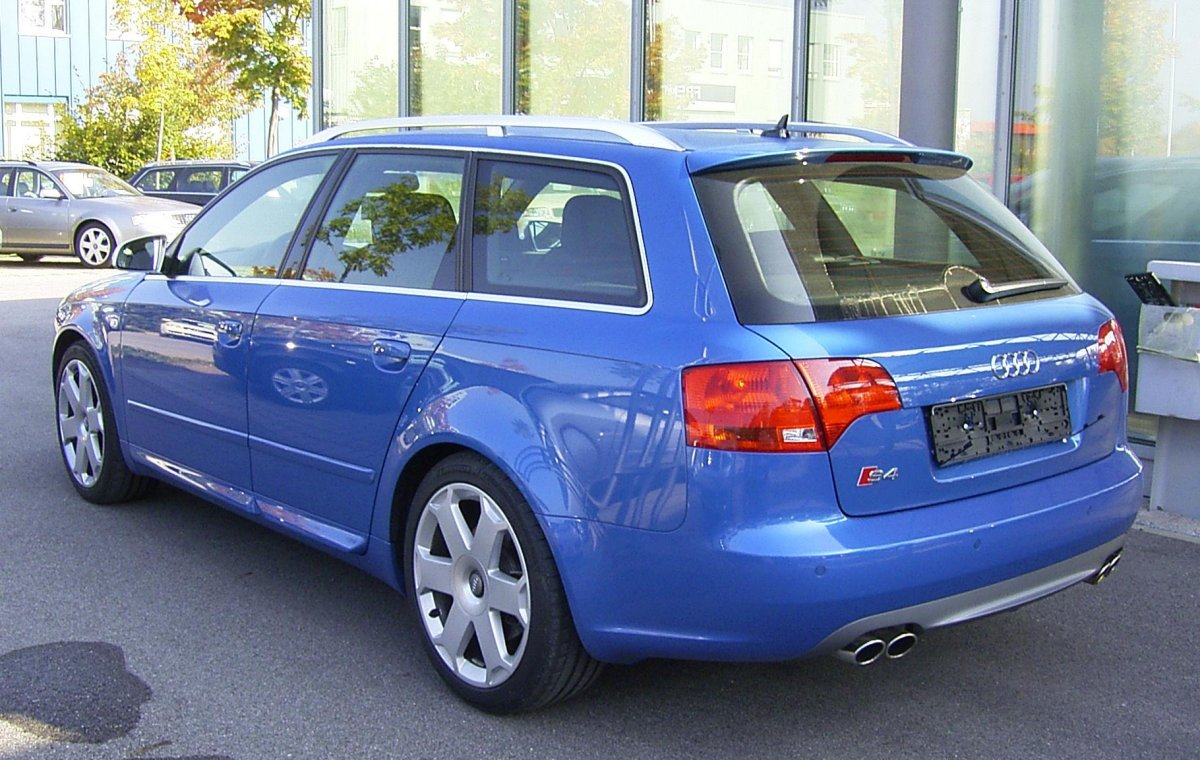
Audi S4 Avant quattro (8ED, Europe)

The Audi B7 platform Audi S4 quattro, based on the Audi B7 A4, debuted in late 2004. Although Audi classifies it as a new car, the differences between it and the outgoing B6 S4 casually appear to be primarily cosmetic, and is still classified by the internal designation: Typ 8E (although with revised sub-designations - saloon: 8EC, Avant: 8ED, and Cabriolet: 8HE). It has the same 4.2-litre V8 engine (identification code: BBK) as the B6 S4, producing a power output of 253 kW (344 PS; 339 bhp) at 7,000 rpm, and 410 N⋅m (302 lbf⋅ft) of torque at 3,500 rpm.

There are a few mechanical changes, such as revised springs and dampers and, from model year 2007, an updated Torsen T-3 automatically biasing centre differential, featuring a 'default' asymmetric 40:60 front-rear torque split on manual transmission models, along with the later Bosch ESP 8.0 Electronic Stability Programme and gloss black painted brake calipers. The 'Avus-III' wheels now became an option, and were replaced by a standard offering 8.0Jx18 inch 'S-design' 7-spoke forged alloy wheel.

A Bose sound system is now standard, whereas it was optional on the B6 S4, and an enhanced optional DVD-ROM-based RNS-E satellite navigation system replaces the previous CD-ROM-based RNS-D option.

The new trapezoidal single-frame grille, Bi-Xenon high-intensity discharge lamp (HID) headlamps, L-shaped tail-lamps, quad exhaust tail pipes, and discrete V8 badging below the side repeater indicators help distinguish the B7 from the previous B6 model.

=== Audi S4 25quattro ===
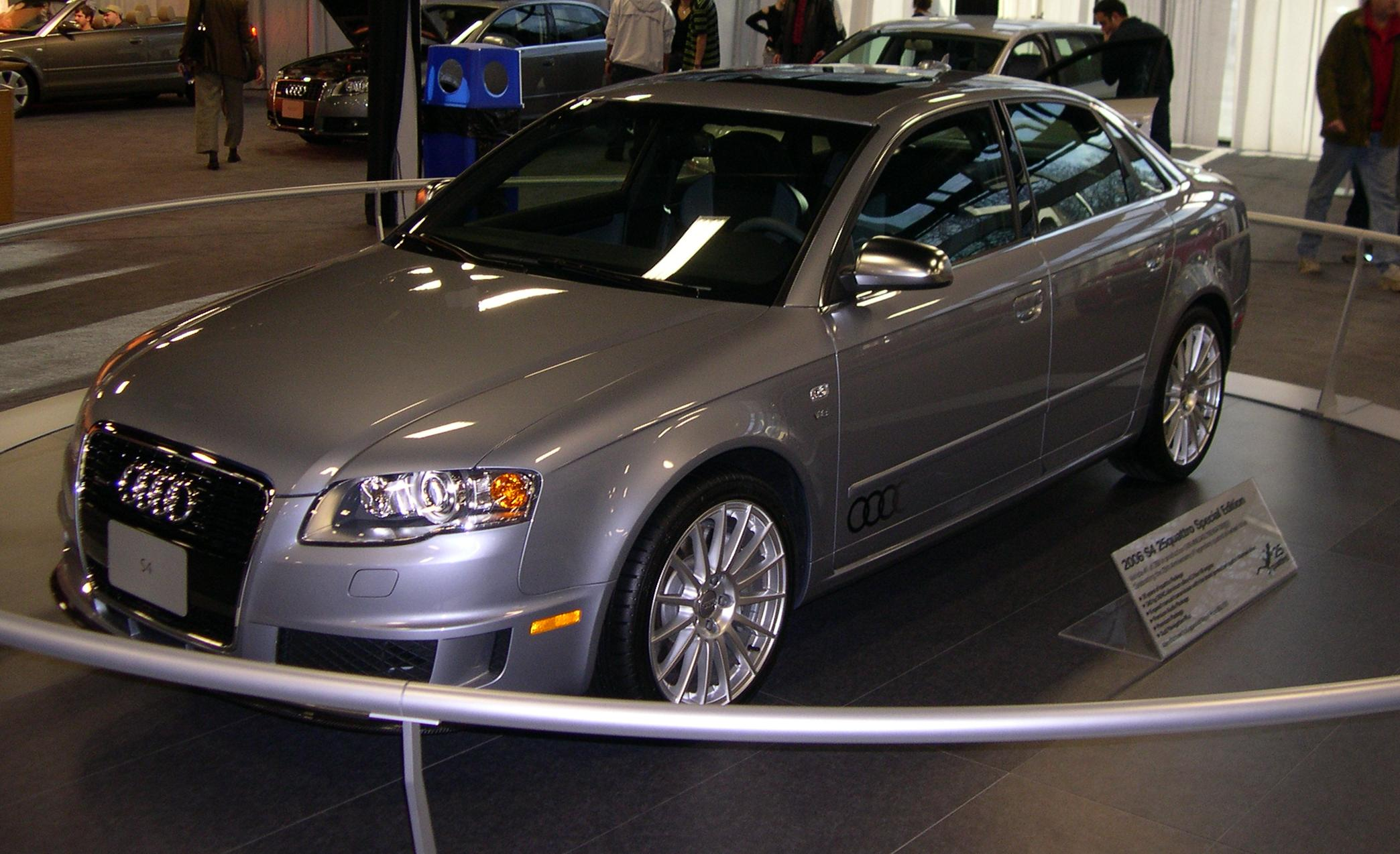
Audi "S4 25quattro" special edition (8EC)

In June 2005, Audi announced a limited edition run of 250 special edition S4 saloon cars, celebrating 25 years of quattro four wheel drive, called the Audi S4 25quattro. Available only in the United States, the exterior has unique front and rear bumpers, a carbon fibre boot lip spoiler and lower front splitter, a rear functional red tow hook, a high gloss Phantom Black painted grille with the "quattro" emblem, and 15-spoke DTM alloy wheels, along with optional dealer-fitted 'Audi four-rings' decals for the front doors. The interior features black and grey contrasting interior leathers, "quattro" embossed into the Recaro seats, and a "1 of 250" exclusive quattro gear shift knob for the manual-only gearbox.

Mechanically, the S4 25quattro was the second Audi, after the B7 RS4, to be fitted with the latest Torsen T-3 asymmetric ATB centre differential for its quattro permanent four-wheel drive system. Under normal grip conditions, this is set with a default rearwards torque distribution bias of 40:60 front to rear, and a maximum of 100% torque can automatically be apportioned to the rear axle (and up to 80% to the front) as conditions warrant. The final drive ratios are 3.889.

== B8 (Typ 8K, 2009–2016) ==
Fifth generation (B8/8K)
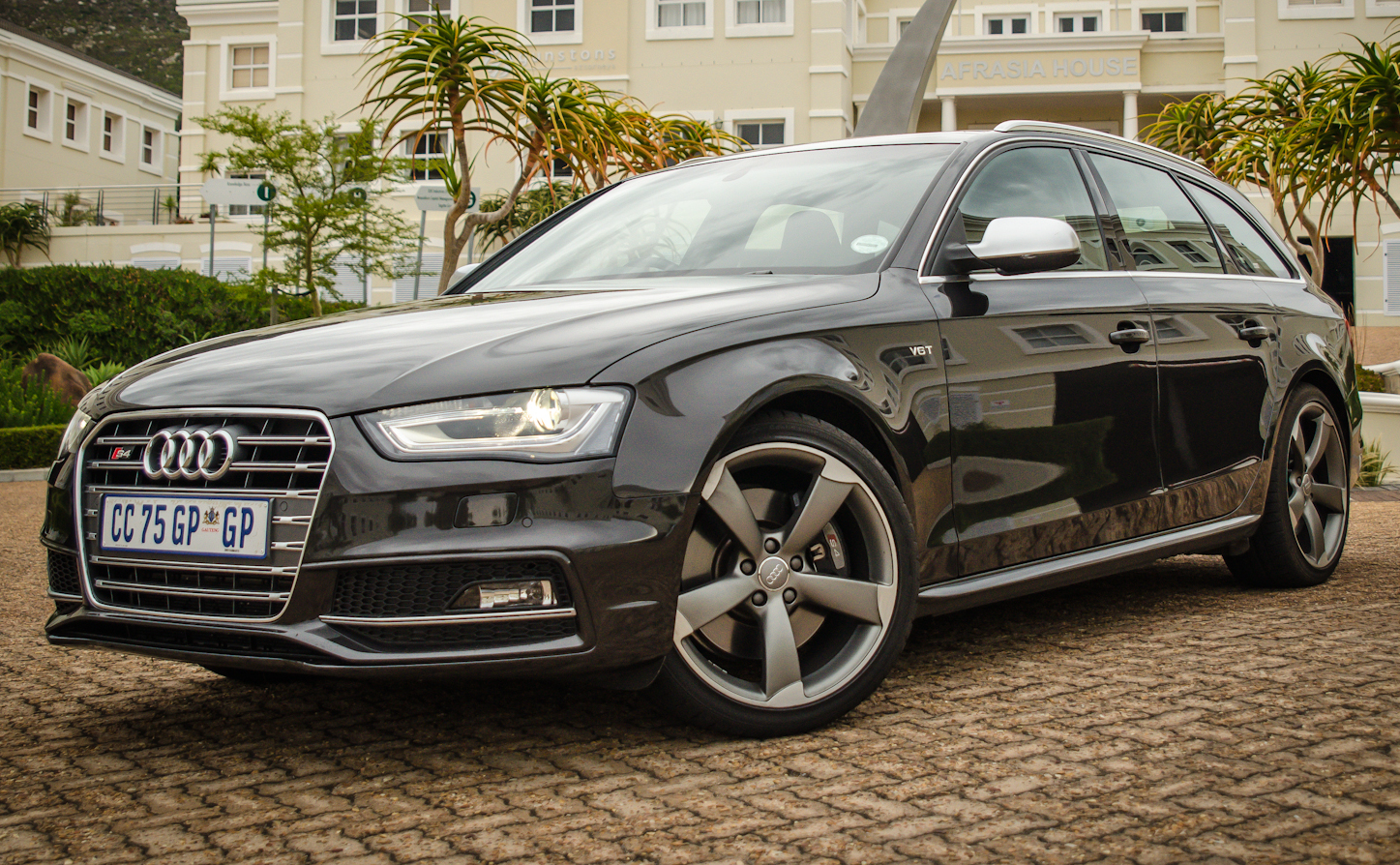

Overview
- Production: Nov 2008–2016
- Assembly: Germany: Ingolstadt

Body and chassis
- Body style: 4-door saloon/sedan, 5-door estate/wagon (Avant)
- Platform: Volkswagen Group MLB/MLP
- Related: Audi B8 A4; Audi B8 RS4; Audi A5

Powertrain
- Engine: 3.0L supercharged V6 TFSI
- Transmission: 6-speed manual, 7-speed Dual-clutch transmission 'S tronic'

Dimensions
- Wheelbase: 2,811 mm (110.7 in)
- Length: 4,717 mm (185.7 in)
- Width: 1,826 mm (71.9 in)
- Height: saloon: 1,406 mm (55.4 in) estate: 1,415 mm (55.7 in)
- Kerb weight: 1,650–1,735 kg (3,638–3,825 lb)

Chronology
- Predecessor: Audi B7 S4
- Successor: Audi B9 S4

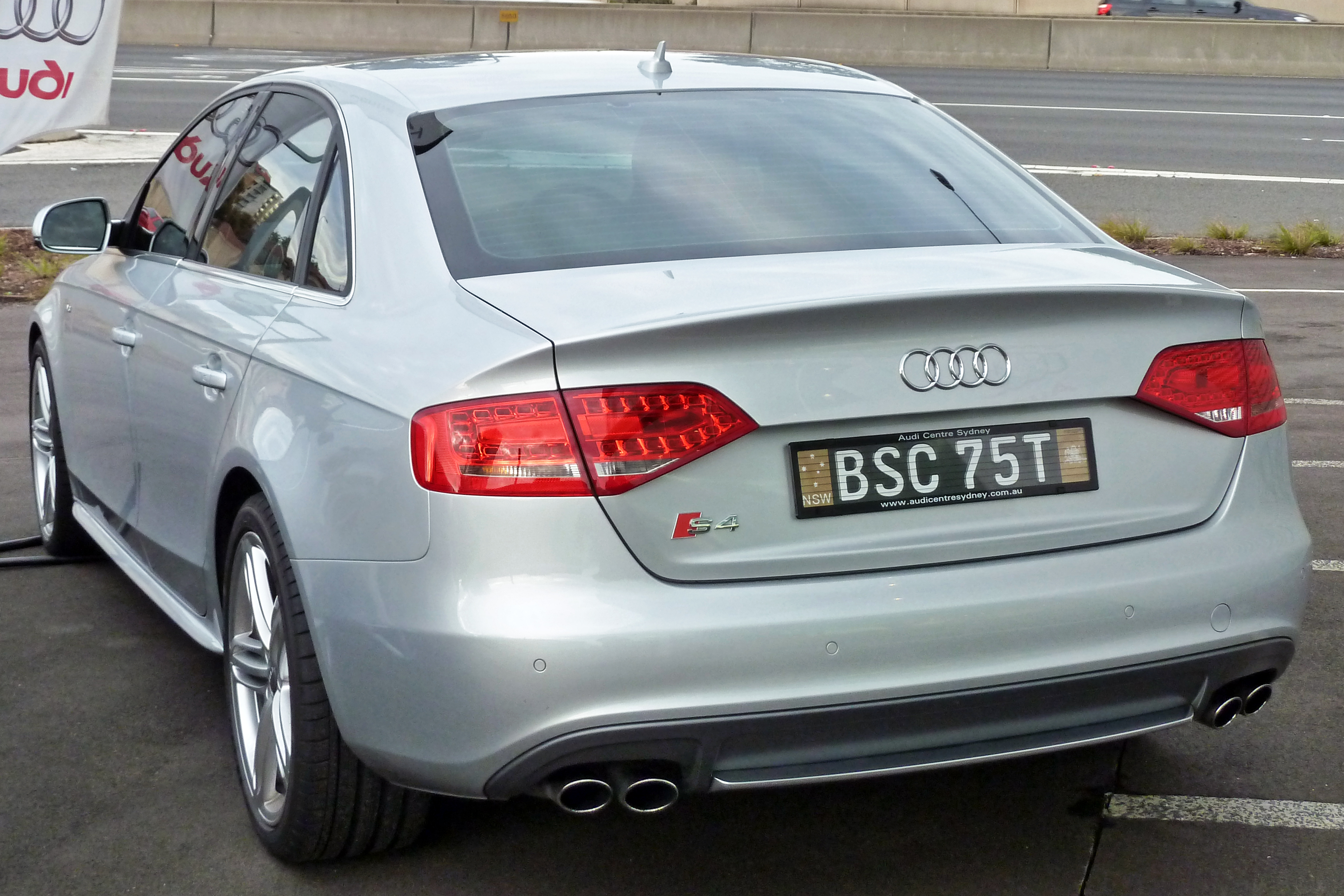
Audi S4 Sedan quattro (B8/8K, Australia)

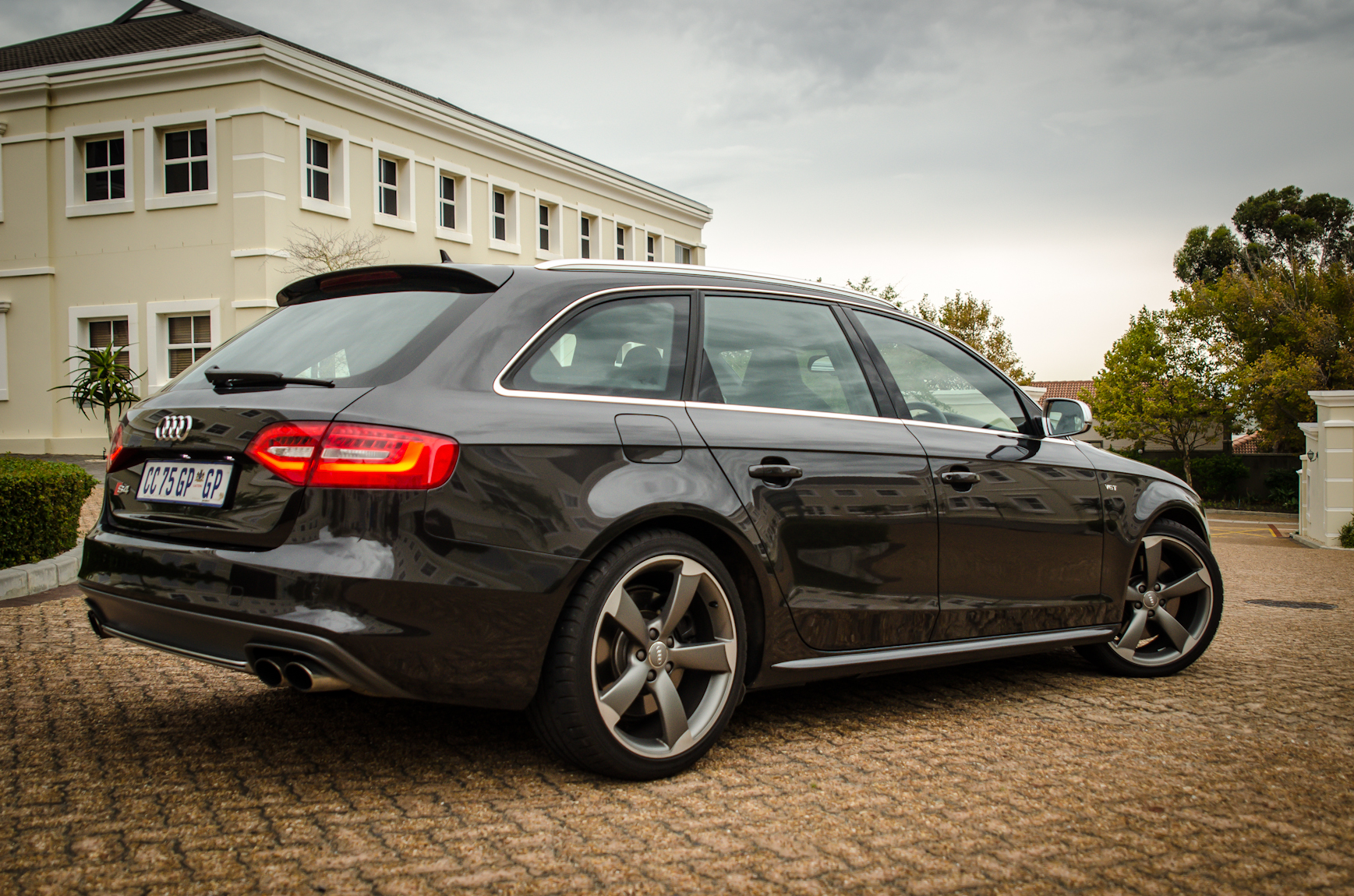
Audi S4 Avant (B8/8K, South Africa)

From November 2008, the fourth generation of the 'Audi S4 quattro' (Typ 8K) entered factory production. It is based on the Audi B8 A4, built on the Volkswagen Group MLB/MLP platform. Unlike the previous B6 and B7 models, the new B8 version was only available as a four-door five-seat saloon (sedan), or a five-door five-seat Avant (estate/wagon). The sport-performance two-door four-seat Cabriolet (convertible) mantle is now taken by the Audi S5 Cabriolet and new Coupe. Unlike previous generations of the S4, only the sedan was imported to the United States and Canada.

Compared to the previous B6/B7 S4 which used a 4.2-litre V8 engine, the B8 S4 uses a smaller displacement 3.0-litre TFSI V6 engine, but now with the addition of forced induction via an Eaton mechanical supercharger.

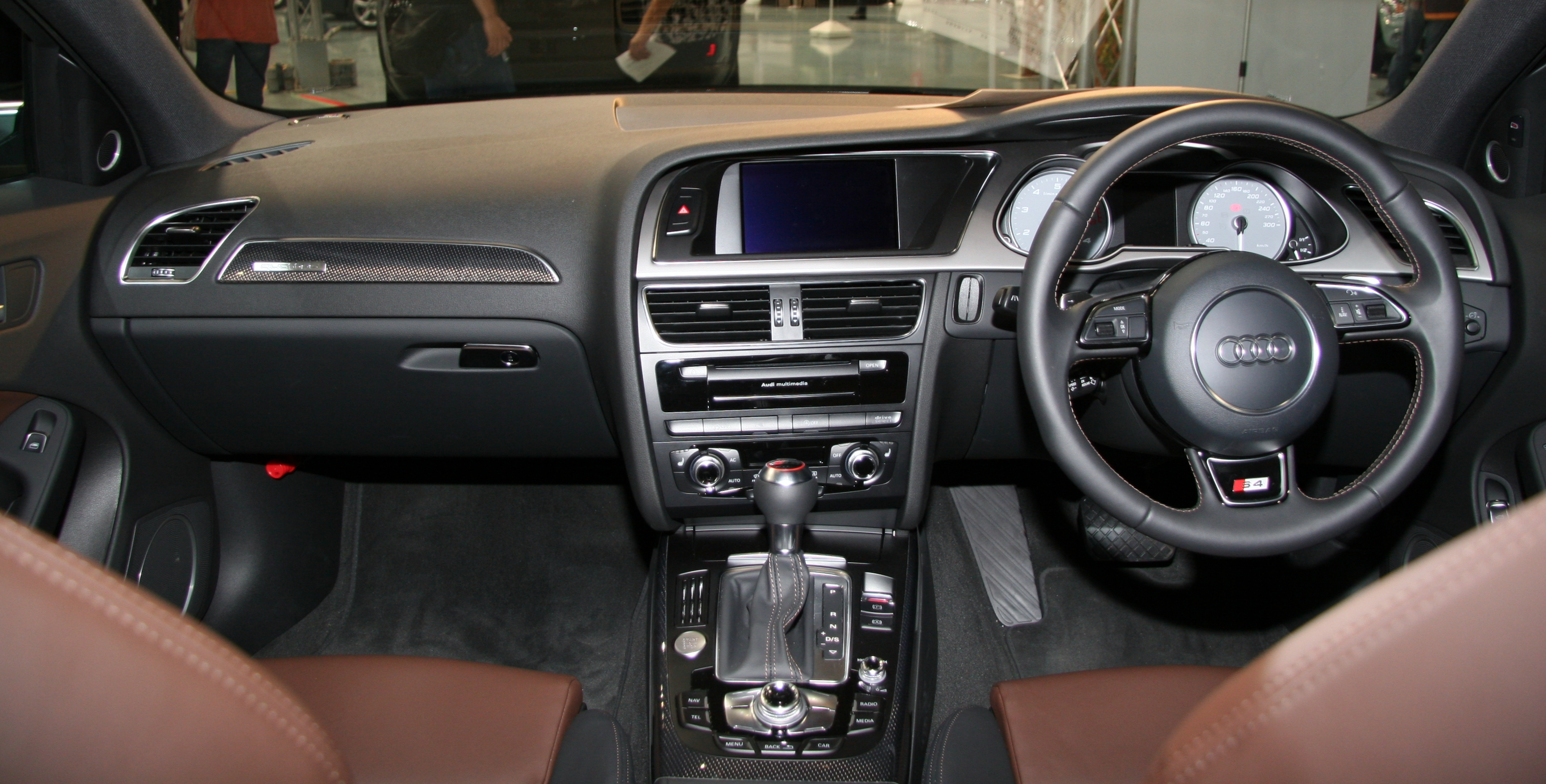
2012 S4 Avant interior

The previous B6/B7 S4s were the top-of-the-line models in North America, ahead of the 3.2L V6 and 4-cylinder 2.0T A4s, and competed with the BMW E46 330 and E90 335 respectively. The 3.0 TFSI V6 engine replaced the 3.2-litre FSI V6 as the upgrade engine in the A4 and A6 lineups starting for 2009; both the 3.2-litre FSI and 3.0 TFSI were offered together until the end of the 2010 model year. The 3.2L V6 engine is no longer offered in the A4 lineup from the 2011 model year onwards, so the recently introduced B8 S4 is now priced 9% lower than its V8 predecessors, and slots directly above the 4-cylinder 2.0T base model. The S4 now compares more closely with the BMW 335i.

Previously unavailable enthusiast driver aids were now optional, such as Audi's Sport Rear Differential, active steering and adaptive damping suspension (part of the Audi Drive Select Package). The front axle was moved by 6.1 inches to the front, which improved the weight distribution of the B8 Platform. Combined with the Sport Rear Differential Audi was able to greatly improve the weight balance and dynamics of the S4 over previous models.

A new designed wheel was included on the B8 S4, an 8.5Jx18" '5-double-spoke S' design alloy wheel with 245/40 ZR18 high performance tyres. Optional 19 inch wheel and tyre packages were also available, sized at 8.5Jx19" alloy wheels with 255/35 ZR19 tyres. LED tail lights were standard fitment, along with Audi's now-trademark LED daytime running lights at the front.

The S4 along with the other B8 models received a facelift in early 2012 for the European market and early 2013 for the Australasian market. This included a revised front-end with new headlights and grille, an updated interior, and upgraded MMI options. Mechanically, the facelift B8 (known colloquially as the B8.5) changed to electromagnetic steering and a lighter crown gear center differential.

=== B8 powertrain ===
At the heart of the B8 S4 powertrain is an all-new, all aluminium-alloy 3.0-litre TFSI Supercharged (TFSI) V6 engine (parts code prefix: 06E, identification code: CAKA), and like the rest of the B8 model range, now with Fuel Stratified Injection (FSI). This petrol engine displaces 2,995 cubic centimetres (182.8 cu in), and it is rated by Audi to a power output of 245 kW (333 PS; 329 bhp) from 5,500 to 7,000 rpm. Torque is rated at 440 N⋅m (325 lbf⋅ft) from 2,900 to 5,300 rpm. This power output is achieved by using forced induction – and specifically, an all-new Eaton 'Twin Vortices Series' (TVS) Roots-type positive displacement compressor. This new supercharger features twin four-lobe rotors, which are axially twisted 160 degrees. It is mounted on top of the engine, within the 'Vee', pumping air directly into the inlet manifold, and incorporates two separate water-cooled intercoolers. This new design of supercharger is said to reduce the noise, vibration, and harshness (NVH) of the engine.

This engine is mated to either a six-speed manual transmission (identification code: KMR) or a seven-speed 'S tronic' DL501 dual clutch transmission (identification code: LHK), the latter with steering wheel mounted paddle-shifters for tiptronic gear selection, which replaces the Tiptronic automatic transmissions found in the B6/B7 iterations. The 'Audi quattro Sports differential' fitted in the rear axle final drive unit is available as an option.

Acceleration from 0-100 km/h (62 mph) takes 5.1 seconds for the saloon with the manual gearbox, with the Avant one tenth of a second slower at 5.2 seconds. The same dash to 100 km/h (62 mph) in the saloon with S tronic takes 5.3 seconds, and the Avant at 5.4 seconds. The top speed is electronically limited to 250 km/h (155 mph). However, a comparison in the American automotive magazine Road & Track showed the acceleration from 0 to 60 mph (97 km/h) in 4.5 seconds for the 6-speed manual transmission. The B8.5 generation with only minor differences (2013-2016) tested a 4.4 second 0-60 mph (97 km/h). With figures like these, the B8 S4 accelerates more quickly than its V8-engined predecessors. Audi of America claims that the version of the S4 achieves 28 highway miles per gallon, and a 0 to 60 mph (97 km/h) acceleration time of 4.9 seconds with the manual transmission and 5.1 seconds with the S tronic. Fuel consumption is rated at a combined 24.2 miles per US gallon (9.7 L/100 km; 29.1 mpg_{‑imp}). Therefore, the B8 S4, unlike the V8-powered B6/7 models, avoids the US gas guzzler tax. The B8 S4's 3.0 TFSI engine also gets only 1 m.p.g. less than the base 2.0 TFSI engine. This is one of the most important reasons for Audi to downsize their engines, while keeping the output equivalent better, by using forced-induction such as supercharging or turbocharging.

The 3.0-litre TFSI Supercharged (TFSI) V6 engine is shared with the Audi S5 Cabriolet (though the 7-speed S Tronic is the sole transmission) and the 2013 Audi S5 Coupe. The 2012–2015 (B8.5 generation) Audi A4 3.0 TFSI quattro has a lower-output version of this engine making 272 PS (200 kW; 268 hp) at 4780-6500 rpm and 400 N⋅m (295 lb⋅ft) at 2150–4780 rpm.

Detuned versions of this engine making 310 PS (228 kW; 306 hp) are found in the 2009-11 Audi A6 3.0 TFSI (C6) mated to a 6-speed Tiptronic automatic transmission, the 2012 Audi A6 3.0 TFSI (C7) and 2012 Audi A7 3.0 TFSI, the latter two which are paired with an 8-speed Tiptronic automatic.

=== Motorsport ===
In motor racing, APR Motorsport has currently entered a B8 S4 in the Grand-Am Continental Tire Sports Car Challenge Grand Sport (GS) class.

== B9 (Typ 8W, 2017–2025) ==
Sixth generation (B9/8W)
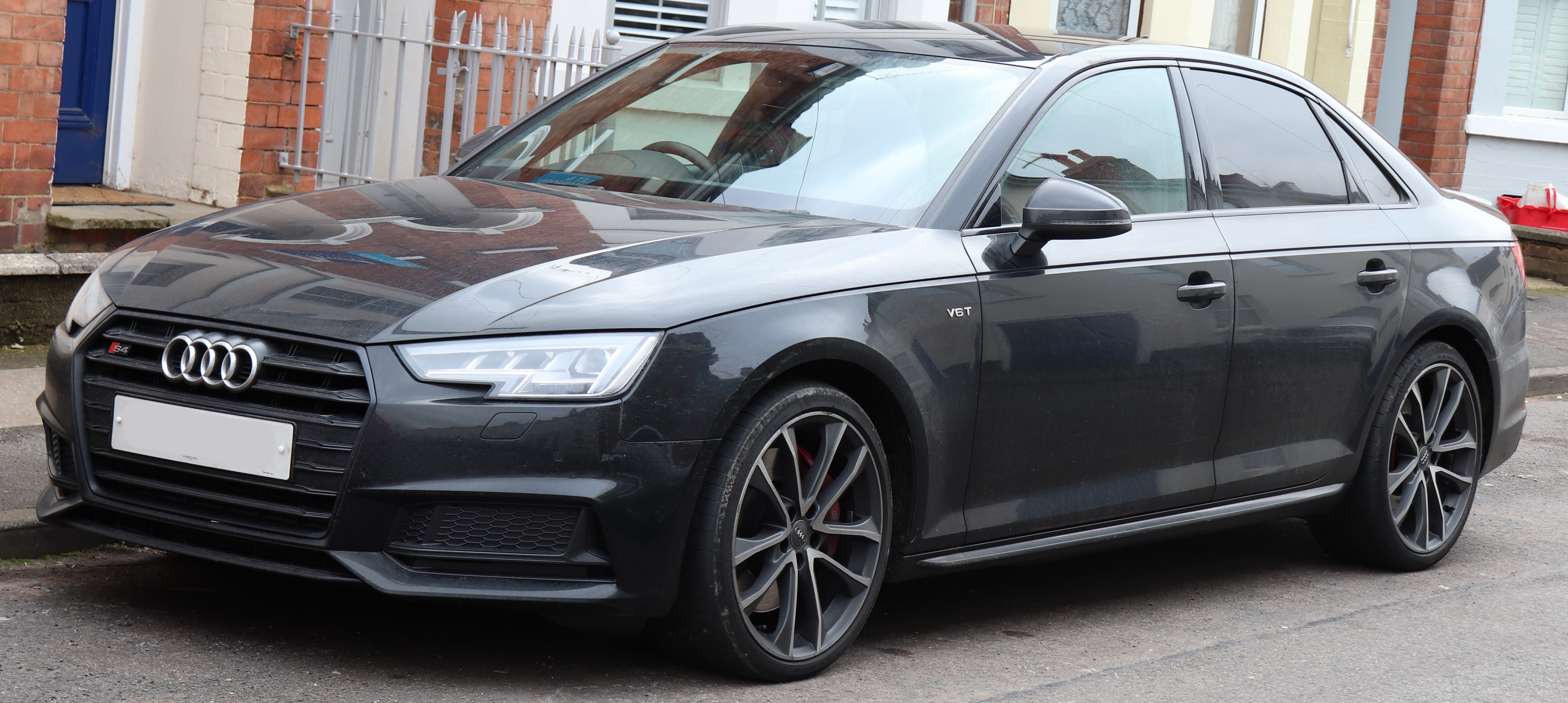
- 2017 Audi S4 quattro 3.0 TFSI (UK)

Overview
- Production: 2017–2025
- Assembly: Germany: Ingolstadt

Body and chassis
- Body style: 4-door saloon/sedan, 5-door estate/wagon (Avant)
- Platform: Volkswagen Group MLB/MLP
- Related: Audi A4; Audi B9 RS4; Audi A5

Powertrain
- Engine: 3.0L Turbocharged V6 TFSI; 3.0L V6 TDI (2019-2025, European markets only)
- Transmission: 8-speed ZF 8HP tiptronic automatic

Dimensions
- Wheelbase: 2,820 mm (111.0 in)
- Length: 4,726 mm (186.1 in); 4,745 mm (186.8 in) (Avant)
- Width: 1,842 mm (72.5 in)
- Height: 1,427 mm (56.2 in)
- Kerb weight: 1,750 kg (3,858 lb)

Chronology
- Predecessor: Audi S4 B8
- Successor: Audi S5 B10

Audi announced the B9 S4 in 2015, with the official unveiling of the European-spec model at the 2015 Frankfurt Motor Show. Noticeable changes to the B9 included a modern, more angular exterior, newly designed wheels, and a new turbocharged V6 engine co-developed by Porsche. Unlike the pre-facelift B8 S4, the announced European-spec model is only available with an eight-speed torque converter automatic (ZF 8HP55a).

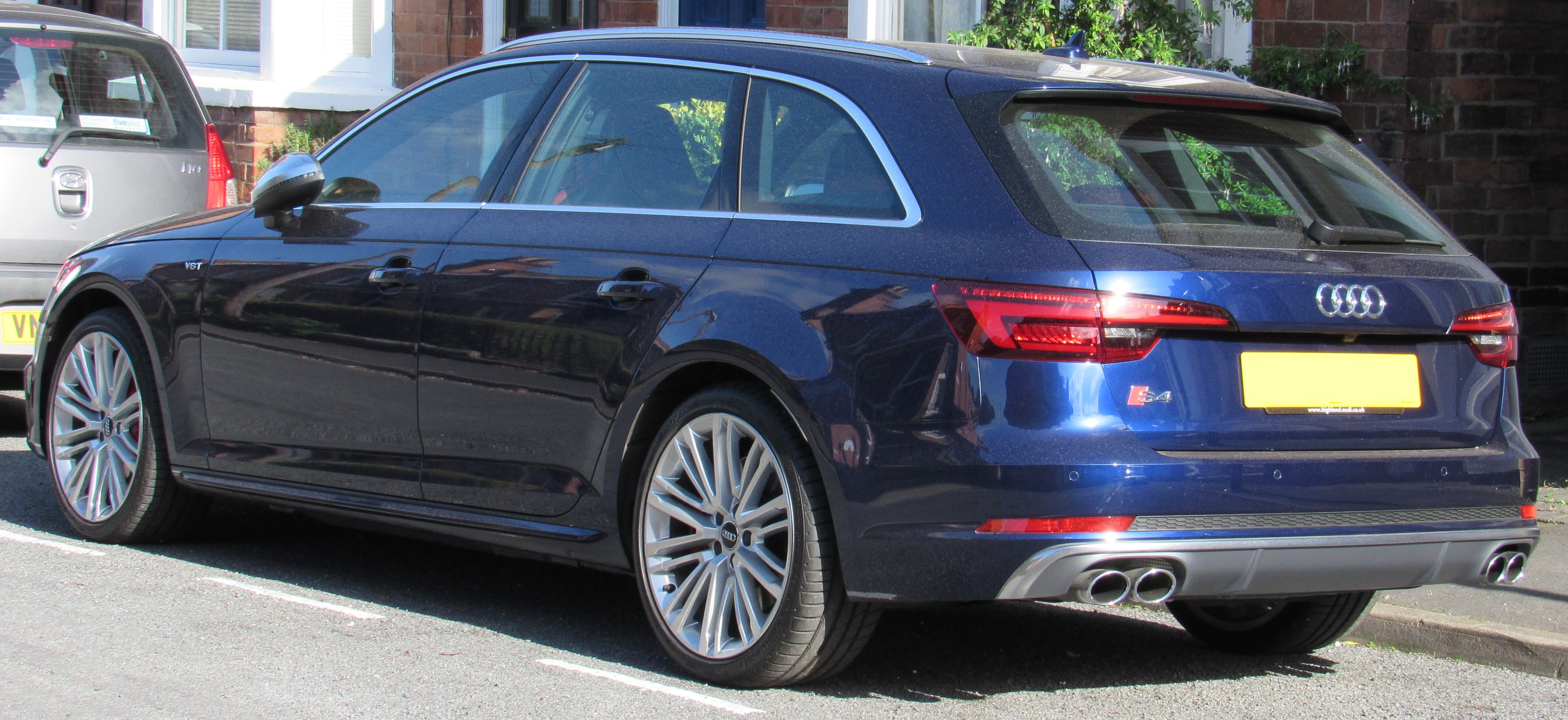
Audi S4 Avant quattro 3.0 TFSI (UK)

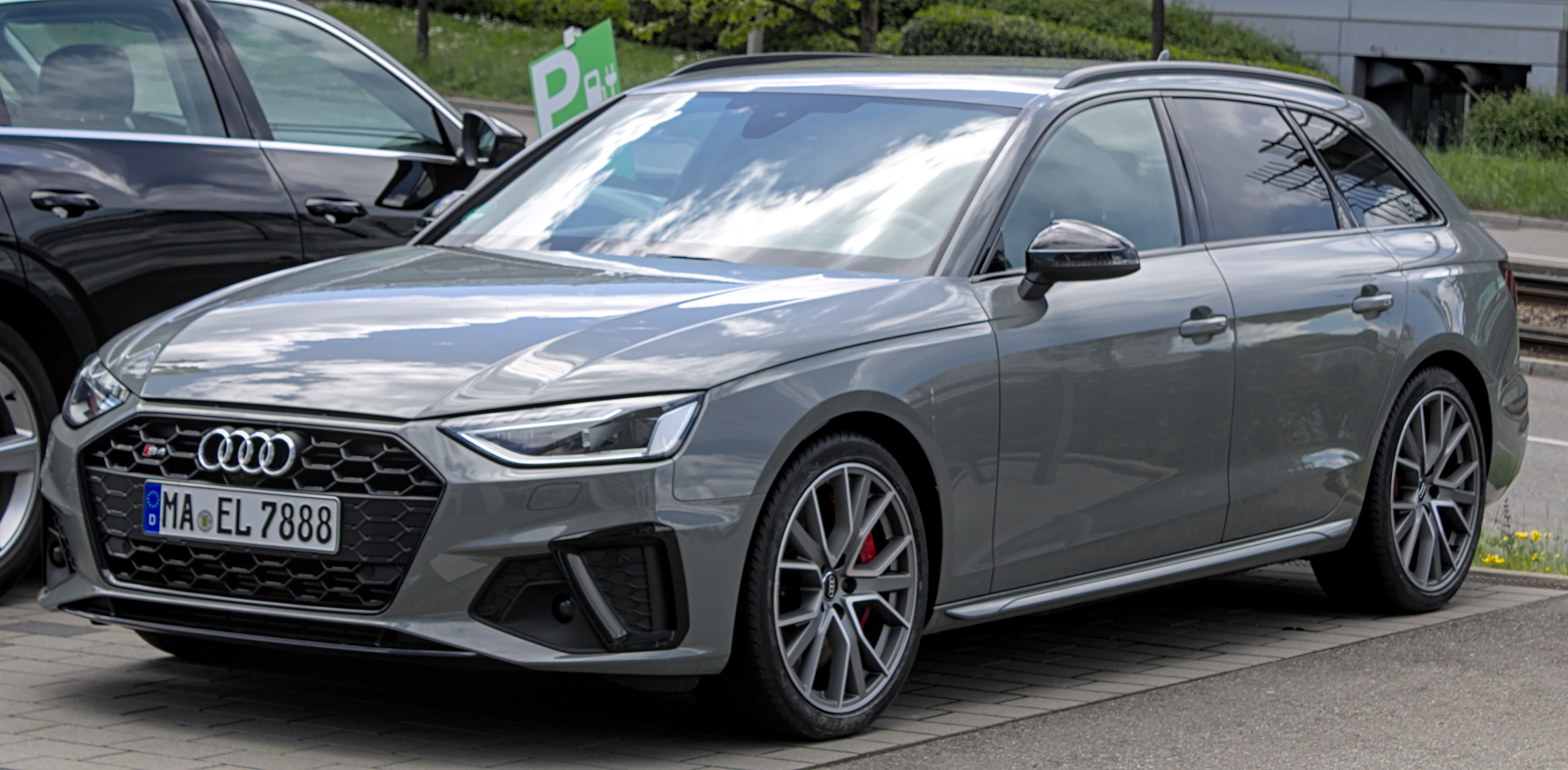
Audi S4 Avant facelift (Germany)

The new model uses LED main-beam and LED daytime running lights as standard, alongside dynamic turn signals and LED tail-lights. Like other Audi models, the notable feature in the new S4 is Virtual Cockpit which has Classic Layout and Sports Layout in displaying speedometer and tachometer.

The B9 S4 features standard 18-inch 5 double-spoke wheels with summer tires, or optional 19-inch 5 V-spoke wheels.

The B9's brakes use multi-piston calipers, replacing the single-piston sliding calipers of earlier models. LED headlights are standard while a flat-bottomed steering wheel, "S" embossed seats, and quad tailpipes differentiate the S4 from the B9 A4.

=== B9 powertrain ===
The current generation S4 is powered by a 3.0 L V6 with petrol direct injection and a single twin-scroll turbo powering the EA839 engine with 354 PS (260 kW; 349 hp) and 500 N⋅m (369 lbf⋅ft). The engine uses a hot inside V layout, which places the cylinder head exhaust ports, exhaust manifolds, and turbocharger inside the V of the engine; this is a similar arrangement to the twin-turbo V8 engines used in Audi's C7/C8 RS6 and RS7 (including C7 S6/S7).

As a result of the powertrain upgrades in the new S4, it now can accelerate from 0 to 60 mph (97 km/h) in 4.2 seconds. It is electronically limited to a top speed of 155 mph (249 km/h).

In European markets, the facelifted B9 S4 - launched in 2019 - is now powered by a 3.0-litre turbocharged diesel V6 with 347 PS (255 kW; 342 hp) and 700 N⋅m (516 lbf⋅ft), mated to a ZF 8-speed torque converter automatic gearbox and all-wheel-drive. For outside of European markets, however, it still retains the 3.0-litre petrol turbo V6.

== See also ==
- Audi S and RS models
