= TEMA =

Tema is a city in Ghana.

Tema or TEMA may also refer to:

== Arts and media ==
- Gazeta Tema, an Albanian newspaper
- Tema (magazine), a Bulgarian magazine
- The Theme (Russian: Тема), a 1979 Soviet film

== People ==
- Tema (son of Ishmael), mentioned in the Torah
- Tema Mursadat (born 1978), Indonesian footballer
- Tema (Jewish name)
- Muzaffer Tema (1919–2011), Turkish actor

== Places ==
- Tayma, an oasis in Saudi Arabia
- Tema, Togo
- Tema Reef, in the Cook Islands
- Land of Tema, mentioned in the Bible and identified with Tayma

== Other uses ==
- TEMA Foundation, a Turkish environmental organization
- Tennessee Emergency Management Agency, an agency of the state government of Tennessee, United States
- The East Manchester Academy, a secondary school in England
- Toyota Motor Engineering & Manufacturing North America
- The Tubular Exchanger Manufacturers Association, an association of fabricators of shell and tube type heat exchangers
- Triple-entry bookkeeping and momentum accounting
- Triple exponential moving average

== See also ==
- Theme (disambiguation)
- topic — common translation of same combination of Cyrillic letters
- Tima (name)
- Yle Teema
