= Ohmstede Limited =

Ohmstede Industrial Services
- Ohmstede Industrial Services
- Founded: 1905
- Headquarters: Beaumont, Texas
- Products: Heating Exchangers
- Parent: Emcor
- Website: Ohmstede.com

Ohmstede Industrial Services is a field service company headquartered in League City, Texas. It was founded in 1905 by German immigrant August Ohmstede. It was originally a machine and auto repair shop. In the 1940s, Ohmstede began specializing in the repair and maintenance of heat exchangers. Specifically, Ohmstede performs much field maintenance on shell and tube heat exchangers commonly found in petroleum refineries and petrochemical plants.

Today, Ohmstede has offices throughout the Gulf Coast region, with over 500 employees. Texas offices are located in Beaumont, Corpus Christi, and La Porte. Louisiana offices are located in Sulphur and St. Gabriel.

Ohmstede was acquired by Emcor in September, 2007, for approximately $455 million.

Ohmstede is a member of the Tubular Exchanger Manufacturers Association (TEMA).
