= Tima (name) =

Tima is both a given name and a surname. Notable people with the name include the following

== Given name ==
=== Female given name ===
- Tima Džebo (1963–2025), Yugoslav and Bosnian basketball player
- Tima Pouye (born 1999), French basketball player
- Tima Shomali (born 1985), Jordanian producer, director, writer, and comedy actress
- Tima Turieva (born 1992), Russian weightlifter

=== Male given name ===
- Tima Fainga'anuku (born 1997), New Zealand rugby union player

== Surname ==
- Ana José Tima (born 1989), Dominican triple jumper
- Ferenc Tima (1919 – 1976), Hungarian sprinter
- Raffy Tima (born 1975), Filipino journalist
- Tima Kumkum, Ghanaian TV and radio presenter

== See also ==
- Tima (disambiguation)
- TEMA (disambiguation)
