= Baffle (heat transfer) =

Fluid-flow-directing vane or panel

Cross-sectional diagram of stirred tank reactor

Baffles are flow-directing or obstructing vanes or panels used to direct a flow of liquid or gas. It is used in some household stoves and in some industrial process vessels (tanks), such as shell and tube heat exchangers, chemical reactors, and static mixers.

Baffles are an integral part of the shell and tube heat exchanger design. A baffle is designed to support tube bundles and direct the flow of fluids for maximum efficiency. Baffle design and tolerances for heat exchangers are discussed in the standards of the Tubular Exchanger Manufacturers Association (TEMA).

== Use of baffles ==
The main roles of a baffle in a shell and tube heat exchanger are to:

- Hold tubes in position (preventing sagging), both in production and operation
- Prevent the effects of steam starvation, which is increased with both fluid velocity and the length of the exchanger
- Direct shell-side fluid flow along the tube field. This increases fluid velocity and the effective heat transfer coefficient of the exchanger

In a static mixer, baffles are used to minimize the tangential component of velocity which causes vortex formation, and thus promotes mixing.

In a chemical reactor, baffles are often attached to the interior walls to promote mixing and thus increase heat transfer and possibly chemical reaction rates.

In household stoves such as Handölkassetten and similar stoves a baffle is used to prevent the gas from going directly up in the chimney and possibly causing a chimney fire and direct the gas towards the front of the oven before it continues upwards into the chimney. In this case the baffle helps increase the efficiency of the stove as more heat leaves the gas before it exits.

- The baffles prevent the rotational flow without affecting radial or longitudinal flow. The tank is provided with baffles which prevent swirling and vortex formation. Except in very large tanks, four(4) baffles are placed.

== Types of baffles ==
Implementation of baffles is decided on the basis of size, cost and their ability to lend support to the tube bundles and direct flow:

- Longitudinal Flow Baffles (used in a two-pass shell)
- Impingement Baffles (used for protecting bundle when entrance velocity is high)
- Orifice Baffles
- Single segmental
- Double segmental
- Support/Blanking baffles
- Deresonating (detuning) baffles used to reduce tube vibration(Anish Apw)

== Installation of baffles ==
As mentioned, baffles deal with the concern of support and fluid direction in heat exchangers. In this way it is vital that they are spaced correctly at installation. The minimum baffle spacing is the greater of 50.8 mm or one fifth of the inner shell diameter. The maximum baffle spacing is dependent on material and size of tubes. The Tubular Exchanger Manufacturers Association sets out guidelines. There are also segments with a "no tubes in window" design that affects the acceptable spacing within the design. An important design consideration is that no recirculation zones or dead spots form – both of which are counterproductive to effective heat transfer.
