= Thema =

Thema may refer to:

== Music ==
- Thema, a composition for bass saxophone & computer-generated tape by Horacio Vaggione
- Thema (Omaggio a Joyce), an electroacoustic composition by Luciano Berio
- Thema (rapper), Italian rapper

== Other uses ==
- Lancia Thema, an executive car produced by Italian automaker Lancia
- Thema, a subsidiary of Canal+ Group
- Thema (moth), a genus of concealer moths in the subfamily Oecophorinae
- Thema International Fund, an Irish investment fund
- Theme (Byzantine district) or Thema, a Byzantine military-civilian province

== See also ==
- Themma, the name of a genus of moths now considered a synonym of Doryodes
- Theme (disambiguation)
