= Tima =

Tima may refer to:

== Places ==
- Tima, Bhutan, Bhutanian town
- Tima, Egypt, Egyptian city
- Bayt Tima, former Palestinian village

== Other ==
- Tima (name)
- Tima people
- Tima language
- Tima (cnidarian), a genus of hydrozoans
- Tima (moth) a synonym of the moth genus Acontia
