= Theme =

Theme or themes may refer to:

- Theme (Byzantine district), an administrative district in the Byzantine Empire governed by a Strategos
- Theme (computing), a custom graphical appearance for certain software.
- Theme (linguistics), topic
- Theme (narrative), the unifying subject or idea of a work
- Theme Building, a landmark building in the Los Angeles International Airport
- Theme music a piece often written specifically for a radio program, television program, video game, or film, and usually played during the intro, opening credits, or ending credits
- Theme vowel or thematic vowel, a vowel placed before the word ending in certain Proto-Indo-European words
- Subject (music), sometimes called theme, a musical idea, usually a recognizable melody, upon which part or all of a composition is based
- Thematic elements, a term used by the Motion Picture Association and other film ratings boards to highlight adult themes in film, television and video games

== Media ==
- Theme (album), by Leslie West
- Theme (magazine)
- The Theme, a 1979 Soviet film
- "Theme", a song by Flying Lotus, from You're Dead!
- "Theme", a song by Loathe from I Let It In and It Took Everything
- "The Theme", a 1989 song by Unique 3
- "The Theme (It's Party Time)", a 1997 song by Tracey Lee
- Themes (Clannad album), 1992
- Themes (Vangelis album), 1989
- Themes (Silent Stream of Godless Elegy album), 2000

== See also ==
- Thema (disambiguation)
