= Varity =

Canadian manufacturing company

Varity Inc
- Traded as: NYSE: VRT TSE: VRT
- Industry: Automotive
- Founded: 1986
- Defunct: 1996
- Fate: Merged
- Successor: LucasVarity plc (non agricultural); AGCO (agricultural equipment under MF banner)
- Headquarters: Toronto, Canada and later Buffalo, New York, United States
- Key people: Victor A. Rice and Vincent D. Laurenzo
- Products: Braking, diesel engines and electrical systems
- Number of employees: 9,000
- Subsidiaries: Massey Ferguson and Perkins Engines

Varity was a Canadian multinational manufacturing company, created in 1986 from the remains of Massey Ferguson (MF) of Toronto, Ontario, Canada. Varity also owned Perkins Engines, headquartered in Peterborough, England, and Kelsey-Hayes Company, headquartered in Romulus, Michigan, as well as subsidiaries in many countries. After a period of corporate losses left MF insolvent, Varity was formed to detach the ownership of insolvent Massey Ferguson from its liabilities, including pension plans, and enable the Massey Ferguson brand and several subsidiaries to continue as working entities. By the year 2000, Varity itself was defunct, having successfully sold off its divisions.

== Decline of Massey Ferguson ==
In the 1970s, Massey Ferguson, based in a large Toronto complex dating from the 1850s, was one of few Canadian multinational companies, profitable on sales on over CA$1 billion annually. It had started a program of investments in industries other than farm implements, and outside of North America. It was one of the companies controlled by the Canadian Argus Corporation holding company. When Conrad Black obtained control of Argus and Massey in 1978, he proceeded on a program of cost-cutting with a plan to make MF more profitable and recession-resistant. In its history, Massey Ferguson generally only provided a profit of under four per-cent per year and Black's plan was to improve the balance sheet. Black installed Victor A. Rice as the new president. The year was disastrous, with an operating loss of CA$200 million, and the closure of its Akron, Ohio plant. However, recovery efforts, including the closing of plants and off-shore subsidiaries were ineffective. By 1980, the company was insolvent, heavily in debt, and Black exited his involvement from the company, donating his shares to the MF pension plan.

Rice closed a further seven plants (laying off 12,000 workers) and fired 15 vice-presidents. In 1981, the company completed a US$715 million refinancing plan with lenders in Canada, France and Britain. The company continued to lose money, but reduced its losses. Its third-quarter of 1983 saw a loss of $11.9 million, compared to $227 million in 1982. While divesting and closing farm equipment plants, it made a move to beef up its Perkins Engines Division, completing the purchase of Rolls-Royce Diesels International Division for US$28.5 million.

The Massey Ferguson complex in Toronto, dating to the 1850s, by this time is little used and is being prepared for redevelopment. In 1985, Massey Ferguson proposes a $400 million redevelopment plan and gets the site rezoned for commercial, industrial and residential uses. In 1988, the 8 hectares (20 acres) site is sold to Counsel Property Corp of Toronto.

== Rebirth as Varity ==
In 1986, the Government of Canada and the Government of Ontario provided CA$250 million relief on the condition that Massey Ferguson remain in Canada and operate manufacturing in Canada. The company is renamed Varity in honor of Victor A. Rice's initials (VAR) but should have been called VANity. At one time, the company made the Verity Plow, after its owner William Verity sold his farm equipments firm to Massey-Harris in 1892. However, the company cannot use Verity and modifies its choice to Varity (VANity would have been more appropriate) (where the first three letters of the name might refer to Victor A. Rice). The company is restructured into Massey-Ferguson, Perkins Engines and Varity Enterprises. The company has reduced debt to CA$400 million and has annual sales of $1.3 billion and 18,000 employees, a reduction from $3.2 billion and 68,000 employees in 1975. Massey-Ferguson has annual sales of $400 million and remains the world's largest supplier of tractors.

In 1988, the company closed its Massey Ferguson Combines manufacturing facilities in Brantford, Ontario, a facility connected with the operations of A Harris, Son and Company's operations in Brantford. A Harris, Son and Company had merged with Massey Manufacturing in 1891 to form Massey-Harris. In 1986, when Varity restructured, its corporate debt was transferred to Massey Ferguson Combines, and the combines maker closure writes off the debt including its pension obligations.

In 1989, Varity buys a majority interest in automotive parts supplier Fruehauf, the parent of Kelsey-Hayes for US$700 million. The Kelsey-Hayes company has 21 factories: four in Canada, 12 in the U.S. and five in Europe. The company manufactures wheels, wheel-end components and anti-lock braking systems for cars and trucks. Combined, the company has annual sales of $4.2 billion.

Despite its promise to the Canadian governments, in 1991, Rice moved the company to Buffalo, New York, setting up in the Williams-Butler House at 672 Delaware Avenue in the Millionaire Row area of Buffalo. and ceased to be a Canadian corporation.

In 1994, in a deal for US$300 million in cash and $18 million in stock, the farm equipment divisions of Varity were sold to the US-based AGCO Corporation. AGCO continued the Massey Ferguson brand and contracted with Perkins as its engine supplier. Massey Ferguson exists today as a brand name within AGCO Corporation of Duluth, Georgia, USA.

In August 1996, the remaining electrical, brake and diesel engine divisions of Varity merged with Birmingham, England based Lucas Industries (Automotive & Aerospace) to become British-based LucasVarity. Rice became the CEO of the new LucasVarity.

In 1998, following the LucasVarity merger, Perkins Engines was sold to Caterpillar.

In March 1999, LucasVarity was purchased by US automotive company TRW for US$6.53 billion. TRW closed the Buffalo, New York head office. TRW was itself acquired in 2002 becoming TRW Automotive and since 2015 as ZF-TRW, a unit of ZF Friedrichshafen.

Victor Rice, the CEO of Varity and LucasVarity, died on June 5, 2022, in Buffalo, New York. Rice was a British native, and had moved in 1975 to Toronto to join Massey Ferguson's head office as an executive. He and his family moved to Buffalo in 1991 with the relocation of Varity. After the sale to TRW, Rice retired in Buffalo and worked with various business associations and the Olmsted Parks Conservancy.
