= LucasVarity =

Defunct UK automotive parts manufacturer

LucasVarity plc
- Traded as: LSE: LCV NYSE: LCV TSE: LCV
- Industry: Automotive and aerospace
- Founded: 1996
- Defunct: 1999
- Fate: Acquired
- Successor: TRW Inc.
- Headquarters: United Kingdom
- Key people: Victor A. Rice
- Products: Braking, diesel systems, diesel engines electrical, aftermarket and aerospace systems
- Number of employees: 55,000
- Subsidiaries: Lucas CAV/Simms/RotoDiesel/Condiesel, Girling, Lucas Automotive, Lucas Aerospace, VarityPerkins

LucasVarity plc was a UK automotive parts manufacturer, created by a merger of the British Lucas Industries plc, and the North American Varity Corporation in August 1996.

== History ==
LucasVarity traces its history back to the 1850s when Joseph Lucas, a jobless father of six, sold paraffin oil from a barrow cart around the streets of Hockley. In 1860, he founded the firm and his 17-year-old son Harry joined the firm around 1872. At first it made general pressed metal merchandise, including plant pot holders, scoops and buckets, and later in 1875 lamps for ships. Together with the historic Canadian farm equipment maker Massey Ferguson the company was formed in August 1996, by the merger between what was then called Lucas Industries plc and the North American Varity Corporation, successor to Massey Ferguson.

=== Foundation ===
At the time of the merger, Lucas employed 46,000 people compared with Varity's 9,000. LucasVarity announced plans for a £65 million pound savings programme. The areas streamlined included the treasury, communications and marketing departments, as well as divisional managers. "The merger created a unique opportunity to reassess the skills and competencies we require in the senior management team", said LucasVarity Chief Executive Victor A. Rice.

=== Attempted relocation to the United States ===
In 1998, the management attempted to shift the company's head office and primary listing to the United States. The company suffered an embarrassing defeat in a shareholder vote, amid claims that its directors were looking to cash in on the much higher pay packets available in the United States. Victor Rice suffered a barrage of criticism from shareholders and the British media.

=== Sale to TRW ===
Following this defeat, an offer was made by TRW, an American company specializing in satellites, defence and automotive parts, to purchase the company in an all-cash offer, which was accepted in March 1999.

=== Subsequent history ===
TRW quickly sold Lucas Diesel Systems to Delphi, which was then a USA based automotive parts and systems manufacturer with a large presence in Europe, during January 2000. The diesel fuel injection equipment research, engineering and manufacturing business of Lucas, known in later years as Lucas Diesel Systems Ltd (and previously CAV Ltd) continues at all of its original worldwide sites (with the exception of those in Japan and South Carolina, USA which had closed by this time). The business name has been changed to Delphi and the business is a major part of its Powertrain Division.

Lucas Aerospace (by then called TRW Aeronautical Systems) was sold to Goodrich Corporation, which itself is now part of UTC Aerospace Systems.

TRW itself was later acquired by Northrop Grumman, who sold the automotive assets of Lucas, Varity and TRW's own automotive group to the Blackstone Group as TRW Automotive.

In September 2004 Elta Lighting Ltd., a UK-based automotive electrical components supplier, acquired a license from TRW Automotive to use the Lucas name and logo on products in the UK and Europe. This saw the familiar green and white 'Lucas' logo return to the UK after several years absence. In September 2018, following a management buy‑out, ELTA relinquished its UK & Ireland Lucas licence for engine management (which includes ignition components such as coils, sensors, etc.). That engine management license was transferred to Standard Motor Products Europe (SMPE), who already held the wider European rights. Elta now only hold the license for switch gear.

2018 also heralded the beginning of the Lucas Classic Parts programme.

The ethos of the Lucas Classic parts programme is built around one core idea: Preserving authenticity while delivering reliable, usable parts for classic vehicles today.

The original style of red and black boxes were re-instated to differentiate the difference between the two brands.

The Lucas Classic parts programme is officially split between three licensed manufacturers, each covering a different vehicle segment.

The 3 Lucas Classic licence holders

Britpart

Licence: 4×4 / off‑road vehicles Focus: Land Rover and related 4x4 applications

SNG Barratt Group

Licence: Classic car parts Focus: Jaguar, MG, Triumph, Rover, Aston Martin, Rolls Royce, Bentley, etc. Role: Main producer of Lucas Classic car components

Wassell

Licence: Motorcycle parts Focus: Classic British motorcycles

These three companies are the global licensed manufacturers of Lucas Classic parts, producing authentic components using original tooling and specifications.

== Operations ==
At formation LucasVarity was managed in seven divisions. The current ownership of these divisions is detailed below.

Division	Original Buyer	Year Sold	Current Owner
Lucas Aerospace	Goodrich Corporation	2002	Collins Aerospace (part of RTX); Safran Flight Controls; Rolls-Royce Engine Controls
Light Vehicle Braking System	TRW	2002	ZF Friedrichshafen
Heavy Vehicle Braking System	ArvinMeritor	1999	Meritor
Lucas Diesel Systems	Delphi	2000	PHINIA
VarityPerkins (Diesel Engines)	Caterpillar, Inc.	1998	Caterpillar, Inc.
Electronic & Electrical Systems	Prestolite & TRW	1998 & 2002	Prestolite & ZF Friedrichshafen
Lucas Aftermarket Operations	Prestolite, ArvinMeritor, TRW, Delphi & Elta Lighting	1998, 1999, 2000 & 2006	Prestolite, Meritor, ZF Friedrichshafen, PHINIA & Elta Lighting
