= Theme (magazine) =

- Editor in Chief: John H Lee
- Frequency: Quarterly
- Publisher: John H Lee, Jiae Kim
- First issue: Spring 2005
- Country: United States
- Website: thememagazine.com

Theme is a quarterly lifestyle magazine that focuses on contemporary creative culture. In collaboration with a guest curator, the publishers collect stories based on a theme, which allows them to provide a coherent lens onto a topic. Initially covering contemporary Asian culture around the world, they opened their content to expanded topics in 2009. Started by the husband and wife team, Jiae Kim and John H. Lee, in Spring 2005, it was initially published four times a year. In 2008, Theme magazine started publishing bimonthly. In 2009 they returned to a quarterly schedule. The editor-in-chief of the magazine is John H. Lee who also publishes it with Jiae Kim.

In 2006 Theme won many design awards, including the Society of Publication Designers annual competition, and Print's Regional Design Competition. It has been featured in Adobe's advertising for its CS2 line of products.

Theme publishers operate a creative agency, called EMEHT. The agency provides creative services to clients like Dickies, Scion, Nike and fashion brands like Tess Giberson, Doo.Ri, Diane von Fürstenberg, Inhabit, and (capsule) tradeshow. EMEHT also created the logo and branding for Brooklyn Machine Works, a cult brand in the bicycling world.
