= Tubular Exchanger Manufacturers Association =

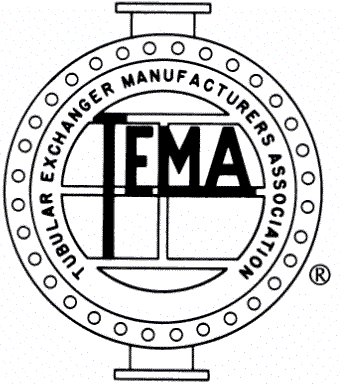
TEMA logo

The Tubular Exchanger Manufacturers Association (also known as TEMA) is an association of fabricators of shell and tube type heat exchangers. TEMA has established and maintains a set of construction standards for heat exchangers, known as the TEMA Standard. TEMA also produces software for evaluation of flow-induced vibration and of flexible shell elements (expansion joints). TEMA was founded in 1939, and is based in Tarrytown, New York. The association meets regularly to revise and update the standards, respond to inquiries, and discuss topics related to the industry.

== The TEMA Standard ==
The current edition of the TEMA Standard is the Tenth Edition, published in 2019. Worldwide, the TEMA Standard is used as the construction standard for most shell and tube heat exchangers. The standard is composed of ten sections:

1. Nomenclature (see below)
2. Fabrication Tolerances
3. General Fabrication and Performance Information
4. Installation, Operation, and Maintenance
5. Mechanical Standards
6. Flow Induced Vibration
7. Thermal Relations
8. Physical Properties of Fluids
9. General Information
10. Recommended Good Practice

== TEMA Classifications of Heat Exchangers ==
TEMA's standard recognizes three separate classifications of exchangers. Each class has different mechanical construction requirements, based on the expected service. Those classes are:

- Class R – for refinery and petroleum service
- Class C – for general commercial service
- Class B – for chemical process service

In general, Class C is the least restrictive class, and Class R is the most stringent, insuring more robust designs for longer life in harsher service conditions.

== TEMA Exchanger Nomenclature ==
Because heat exchangers can be configured many different ways, TEMA has standardized the nomenclature of exchanger types. A letter designation is used for the front head type, shell type, and rear head type of an exchanger. For example, a fixed tubesheet exchanger with bolted removable bonnets is designated as a 'BEM' type. A kettle type reboiler with a removable U-tube bundle is a 'BKU' type. Many different letter combinations are possible.

== Member Companies of TEMA ==
The member companies of TEMA must demonstrate high quality exchanger fabrication standards, and possess in-house engineering capability for mechanical and thermal design of shell and tube type heat exchangers. Companies may fabricate other equipment in addition to heat exchangers. The current member companies of TEMA (in alphabetical order) are:

- Brask, Inc.
- Cust-O-Fab, Inc.
- Dunn Heat Exchangers, Inc.
- Energy Exchanger Corp.
- Fabsco Shell and Tube
- Graham Corporation
- Heat Transfer Equipment Company
- Hughes-Anderson Heat Exchangers, Inc.
- Kennedy Tank and Manufacturing Co.
- Krueger Engineering & Mfg.
- Joseph Oat Corp.
- Ohmstede, Inc
- Perry Products
- R.A.S. Process Equipment
- Southern Heat Exchanger
- Struthers-Wells
- Ward Vessel and Exchanger
