= Audi A6 =

Executive car

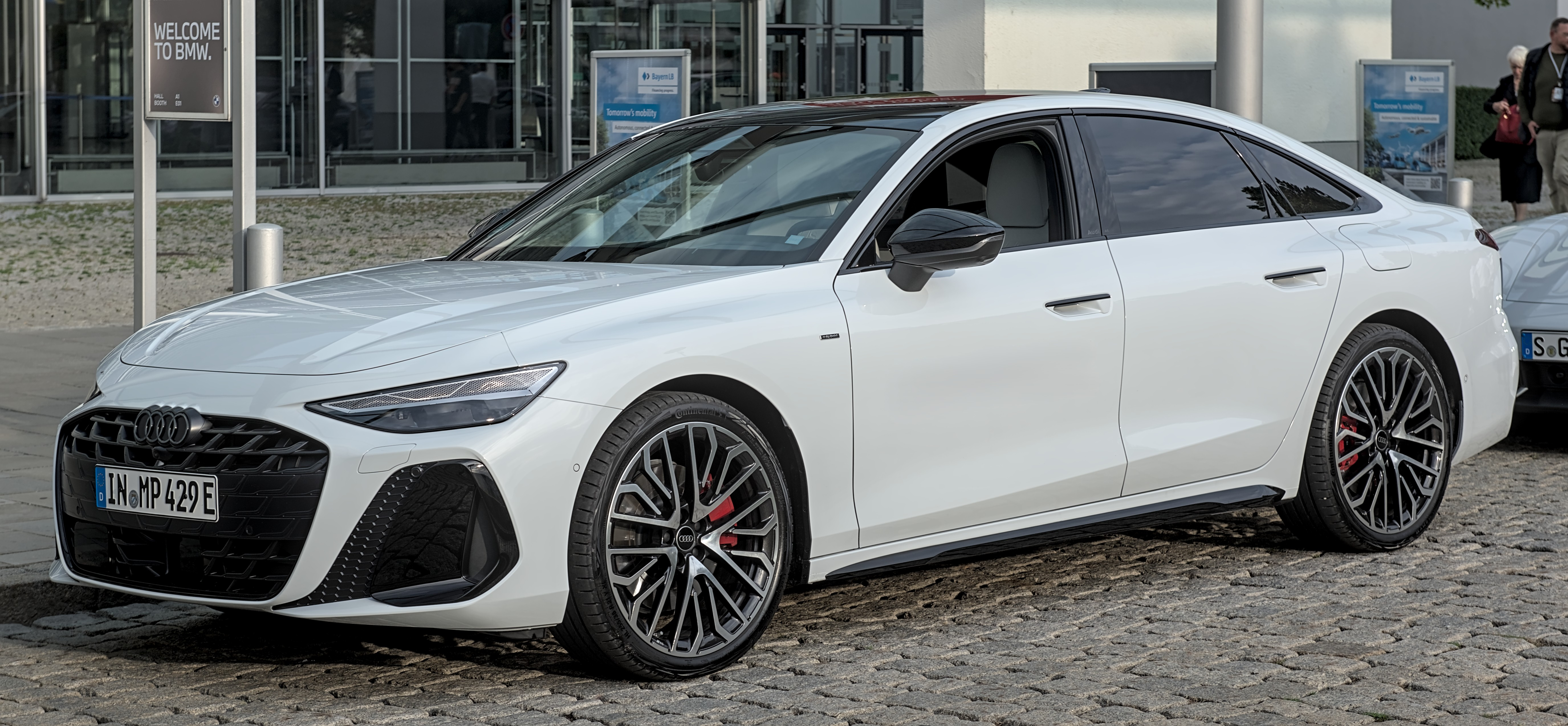
- 2025 Audi A6 (C9)

Overview
- Manufacturer: Audi AG
- Production: 1994–present 2000–present (China)

Body and chassis
- Class: Executive car (E)
- Body style: 4-door saloon/sedan 5-door Avant (estate)
- Layout: Longitudinal FF / F4 layout (quattro)

Chronology
- Predecessor: Audi 100

The Audi A6 is an executive car manufactured by the German company Audi since 1994. Now in its sixth generation, the successor to the Audi 100 is manufactured in Neckarsulm, Germany, and is available in saloon and estate configurations, the latter marketed by Audi as the Avant. Audi's internal numbering treats the A6 as a continuation of the Audi 100 lineage, with the initial A6 designated as a member of the C4-series, followed by the C5, C6, C7, C8 and the C9. The related Audi A7 is essentially a Sportback (liftback) version of the C7-series and C8-series A6 but is marketed under its own separate identity and model designation.

All generations of the A6 have offered either front-wheel-drive or Torsen-based four-wheel-drive, marketed by Audi as their quattro system. The A6 has also been used as the basis for the company's Allroad models since 1999.

The battery-electric model is sold as the A6 e-tron.

== C4 (Typ 4A, 1994) ==
First generation (C4)
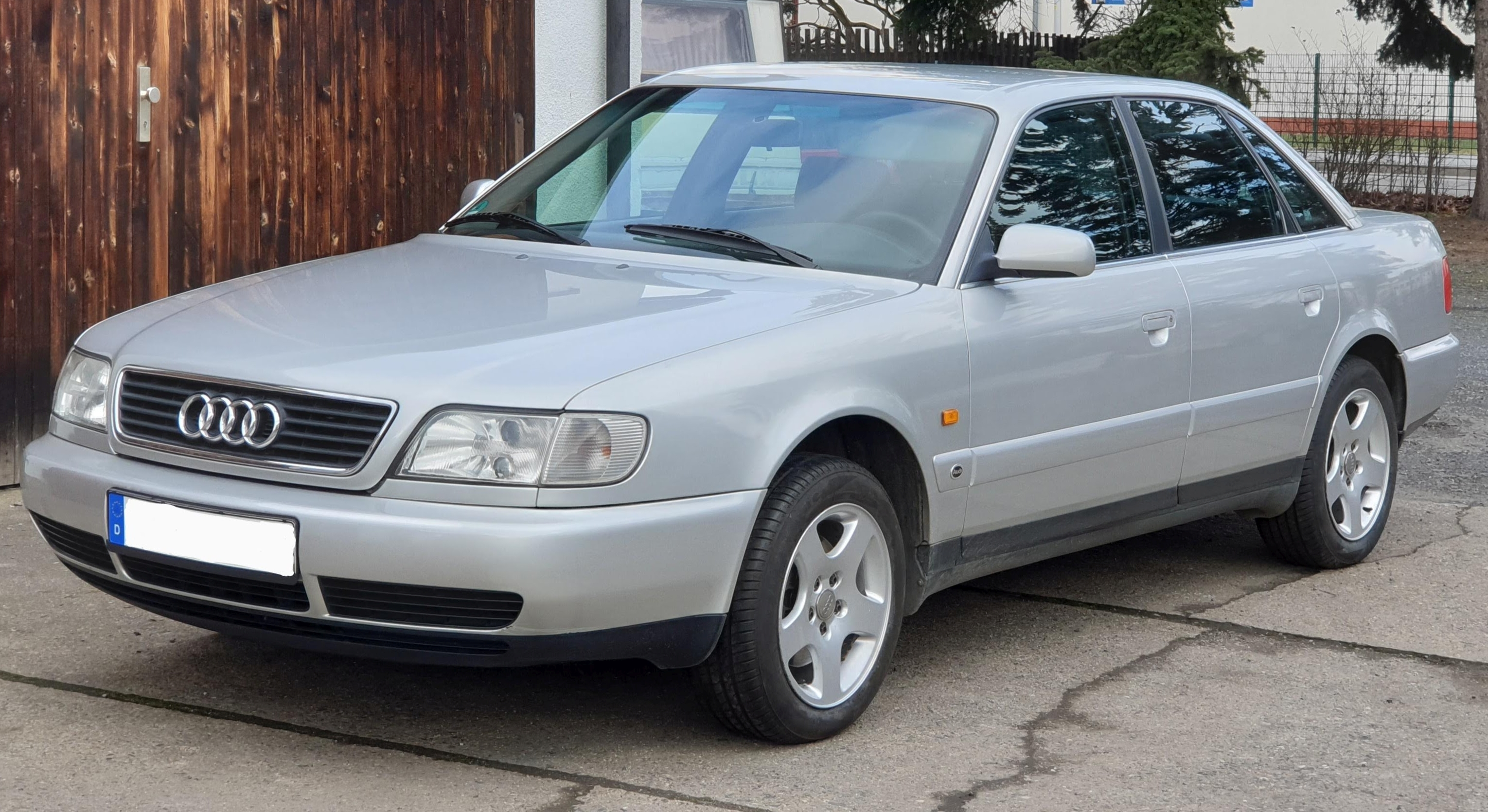
- Audi A6 sedan (Europe)

Overview
- Model code: 4A
- Production: 1994–1998 (Germany); 2000–2003 (China)
- Assembly: Germany: Neckarsulm; China: Changchun (FAW-VW)
- Designer: Hartmut Warkuß (1992)

Body and chassis
- Platform: Volkswagen Group C4
- Related: Audi 100 (1990–1994); Audi S4 (UrS4) (1991–1994); Audi S6 (UrS6) (1994–1997, a renamed Audi S4)

Powertrain
- Engine: petrol: 1.8 L 20V I4; 2.0 L 8V/16V I4; 2.2 L 20V turbo I5; 2.3 L 10V I5; 2.6 L 12V V6; 2.8 L 12V/30V V6; 4.2 L 32V V8; diesel: 1.9 L TDI 8V I4; 2.5 L TDI 10V I5
- Transmission: 5/6-speed manual 4/5-speed automatic

Dimensions
- Wheelbase: 2,687 mm (105.8 in) (FWD); 2,692 mm (106.0 in) (AWD)
- Length: 4,797 mm (188.9 in)
- Width: 1,783 mm (70.2 in)
- Height: 1,430 mm (56.3 in)

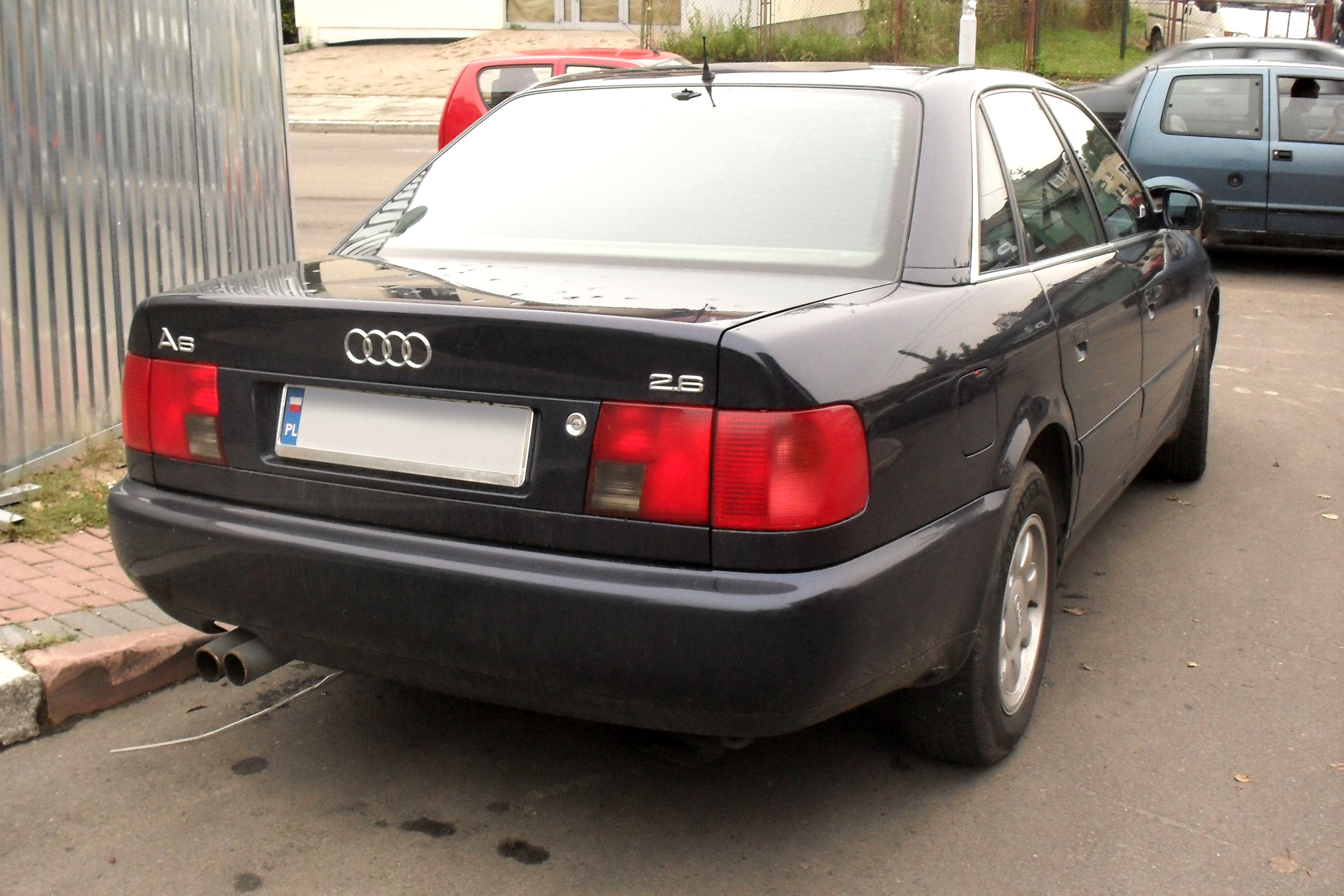
Sedan

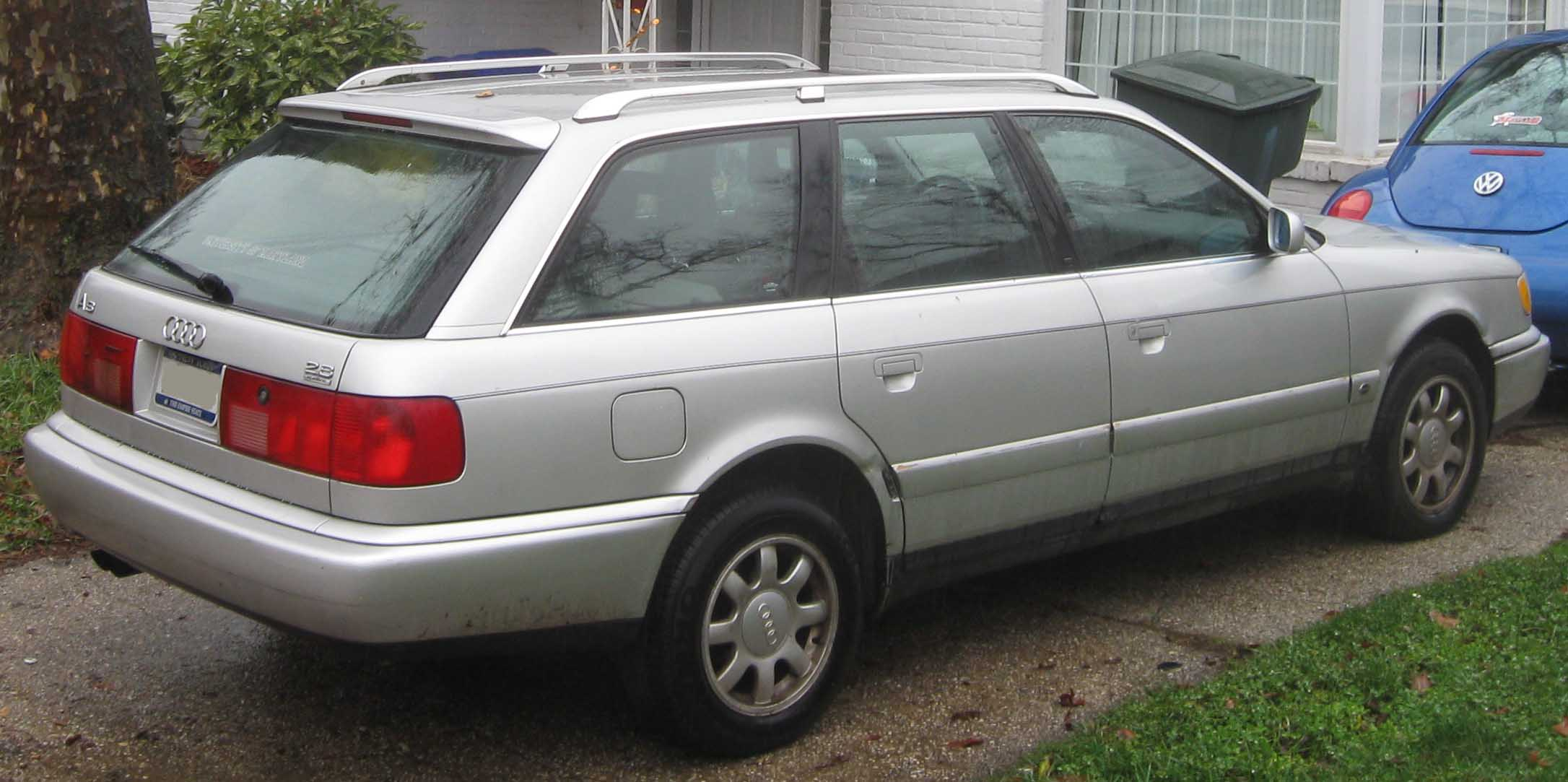
Avant

Audi's executive car was previously named the Audi 100 (or Audi 5000 in the United States), and was released in three successive generations (Audi C1, Audi C2 and Audi C3). In 1994, the latest generation (C4) of the Audi 100 received a facelift and was renamed as the Audi A6, to fit in with Audi's new alphanumeric nomenclature (as the full-size A8 had just been introduced). The exterior was changed only slightly from the "C4" Audi 100 – new front and rear lights, new radiator grille, similarly with chassis and engine and transmission choices. The United Kingdom was the first market to receive the A6, as stock of RHD Audi 100s had run out before expected, and before the rest of mainland Europe.

The new engines for the A6 were 1.8-litre 20v inline four-cylinder, 2.0-litre 8v inline-four, 2.6-litre 12V V6 and 2.8-litre 30v V6 petrol engines, with the 2.3-litre inline-five engine being dropped on most markets. For the diesel engines, an inline-four 1.9 Turbocharged Direct Injection (TDI), and the inline-five (R5) 2.5 TDI with 103 kW (140 PS; 138 bhp) were available.

Most of the engine options were also available with Audi's Torsen-based quattro permanent four-wheel-drive system. Amongst enthusiasts, the torsen-based Quattro system was the superior choice, offering better handling and consistent full-time all wheel drive. The A6 was available with saloon and Avant bodies.

=== C4 engines ===
The C4 design was available with the following engines:

engine	configuration	Max. power
petrol engines
1.8 20v (ADR)	Inline 4 DOHC	92 kW (125 PS; 123 bhp)
2.0 8v SPFI (ABK)	Inline 4 SOHC	74 kW (101 PS; 99 bhp)
2.0 8v MPFI	Inline 4 SOHC	85 kW (115 PS; 113 bhp)
2.0 16v (ACE)	Inline 4 DOHC	103 kW (140 PS; 138 bhp)
2.2 20v Turbo (AAN; S6)	Inline 5 DOHC	169 kW (230 PS; 227 bhp)
2.3 10v (AAR)	Inline 5 SOHC	98 kW (133 PS; 131 bhp)
2.4 12v (AFM - Only in Thailand, for tax reasons)	V6 SOHC	110 kW (150 PS; 148 bhp)
2.6 12v (ABC)	V6 SOHC	110 kW (150 PS; 148 bhp)
2.8 12v (AAH)	V6 SOHC	128 kW (174 PS; 172 bhp)
2.8 30v (ACK)	V6 DOHC	142 kW (193 PS; 190 bhp)
4.2 32v (AEC) (S6)	V8 DOHC	213 kW (290 PS; 286 bhp)
4.2 32v (AHK) (S6 Plus)	V8 DOHC	240 kW (326 PS; 322 bhp)
diesel engines
1.9 TDI 8v	Inline 4 SOHC	66 kW (90 PS; 89 bhp)
2.5 TDI 10v	Inline 5 SOHC	85 kW (115 PS; 113 bhp)
2.5 TDI 10v	Inline 5 SOHC	103 kW (140 PS; 138 bhp)

Crash testing
NHTSA Frontal impact; Driver side:	5/5 stars
NHTSA Frontal impact; Passenger side:	5/5 stars
Folksam overall frontal crash test:	Good

=== S6 ===
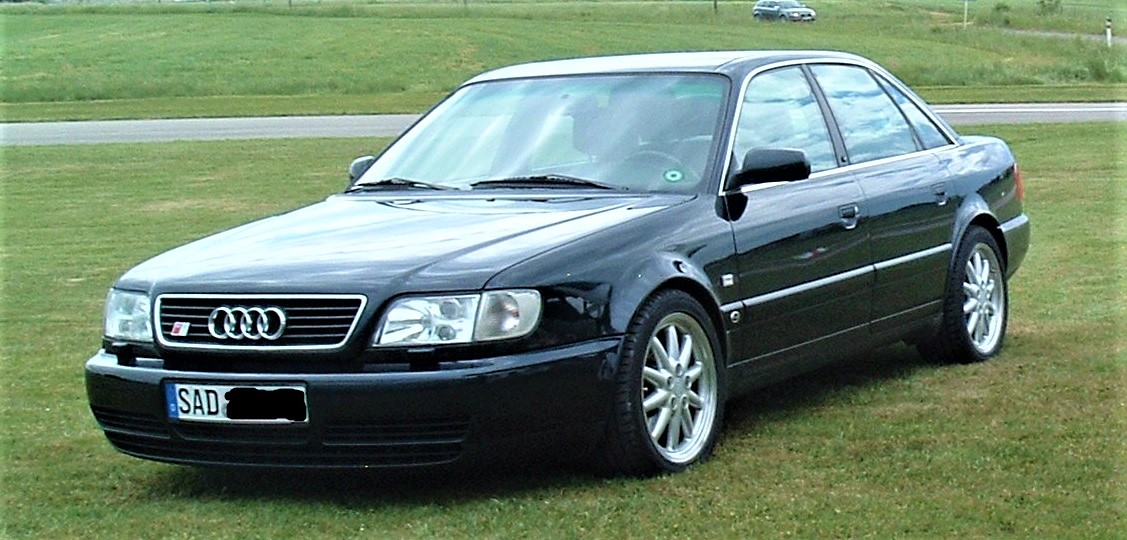
Audi S6

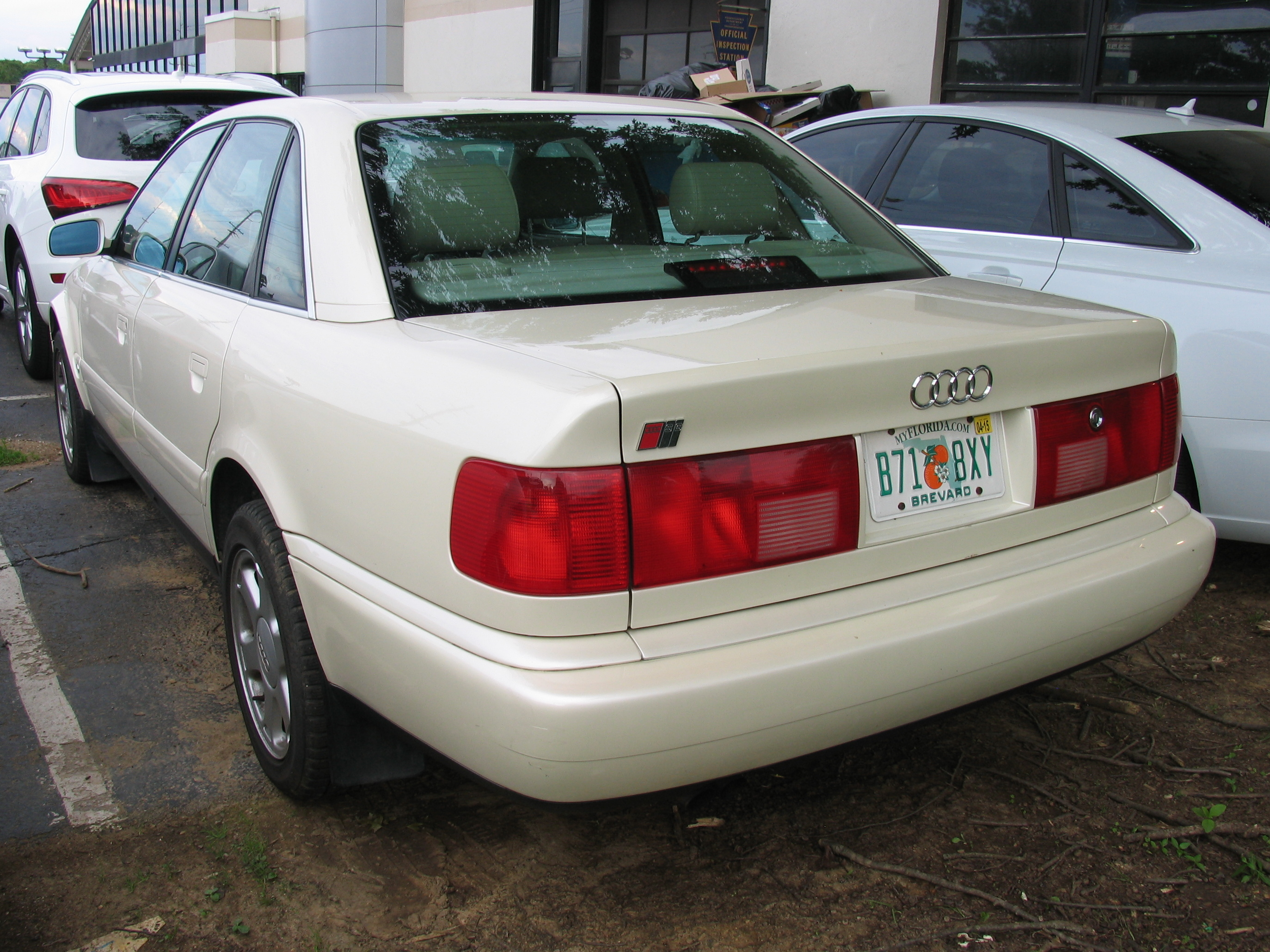
Audi S6

Upon introducing the C4 series A6, Audi made small revisions to what was previously known as the Audi S4, renaming it the Audi S6; the S4 name would eventually be re-used for a completely different model derived from Audi's smaller Volkswagen Group B platform-based Audi A4. As this was the first S6 model from Audi, it is commonly referred to as the Ur-S6, derived from the German augmentative, "Ursprünglich" (meaning: original). It was available as both a saloon/sedan (type 4A5), and an "Avant" (type 4A9) (estate/wagon) to European and United States customers, but only as a saloon in Canada, Asia and Australia.

From its launch in late 1994, the Audi S6 was powered by a 2,226 cubic centimetres (135.8 cu in) turbocharged inline five-cylinder petrol engine (parts code prefix: 034, identification code: AAN) with a Bosch Motronic electronic engine control unit (ECU), producing a motive power output of 169 kW (230 PS; 227 bhp) at 5,900 rpm and 350 N⋅m (258 lb⋅ft) at around 1,950 rpm, on high octane "Super Plus" 98RON unleaded petrol. This engine gave the S6 a top speed of 241 km/h (149.8 mph), and allowed it to accelerate from 0 to 100 km/h (62.1 mph) in 6.7 seconds; with 160 km/h (99.4 mph) being reached in 17.5 seconds. The vehicle was available with a standard six-speed manual transmission (five-speed only in North America), and Audi's dynamic Torsen T-1 Quattro permanent four-wheel-drive system.

Audi made a 4.2-litre V8 engine (parts code prefix: 077, identification code: AEC) with a Bosch KE-Motronic ECU available as an option in the original European S4s, and made the decision to continue to do so with the S6, making a 213 kW (290 PS; 286 bhp) version of the 4.2 available as an optional upgrade over the 2.2-litre inline five-cylinder turbo. Unlike the five-cylinder turbocharged version, the V8-powered S6 was supplied with a four-speed automatic transmission as standard but kept the Quattro four-wheel-drive. A six-speed manual gearbox was also available as an option.

=== Audi S6 PLUS ===
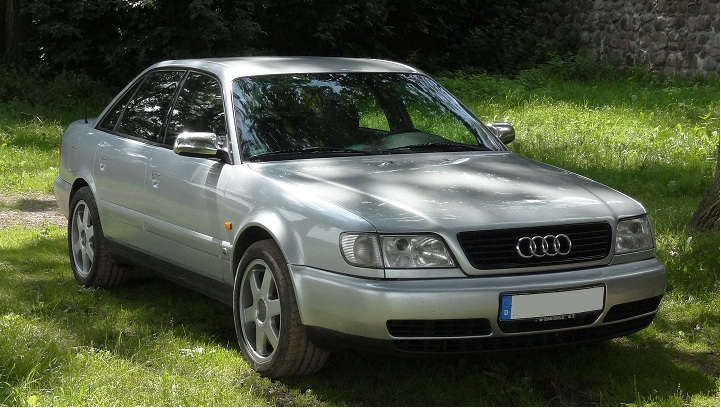
Audi S6 Plus

As a swan song to the C4 platform, an even more powerful, and very limited-production Audi S6 Plus was briefly available to European customers. The S6 Plus, developed by Audi's wholly owned high-performance subsidiary, quattro GmbH, was available for sale during the 1997 model year only (production from June 1996 to October 1997). A total of 952 cars were produced; 855 Avants and 97 saloons.

It was powered by another version of the 32-valve (four valves per cylinder) 4.2-litre V8 engine (parts code prefix: 077, identification code: AHK, later to be seen in the Audi S8 as AKH). Audi's performance division reworked key parts of the engine, increasing the maximum power to 240 kW (326 PS; 322 bhp). It was only available with a revised six-speed manual transmission (parts code prefix: 01E, identification code: DGU) (gear ratios – 1st: 3.500, 2nd: 1.889, 3rd: 1.320, 4th: 1.034, 5th: 0.857, 6th: 0.730), with a final drive ratio of 4.111.

Further revisions were made to the suspension, brakes, and wheels. The front brake discs were enlarged to 323 mm (12.7 in) in diameter by 30 mm (1.18 in) thick. Standard wheels were 8Jx17 "Avus" cast aluminium alloy wheels, with an optional 7Jx16 alloy wheel for use with winter tyres was also available.

The S6 Plus saloon could reach 100 km/h (62.1 mph) from a standstill in 5.6 seconds, with the Avant a tenth of a second slower at 5.7 seconds.

== C5 (Typ 4B, 1997) ==
Second generation (C5)
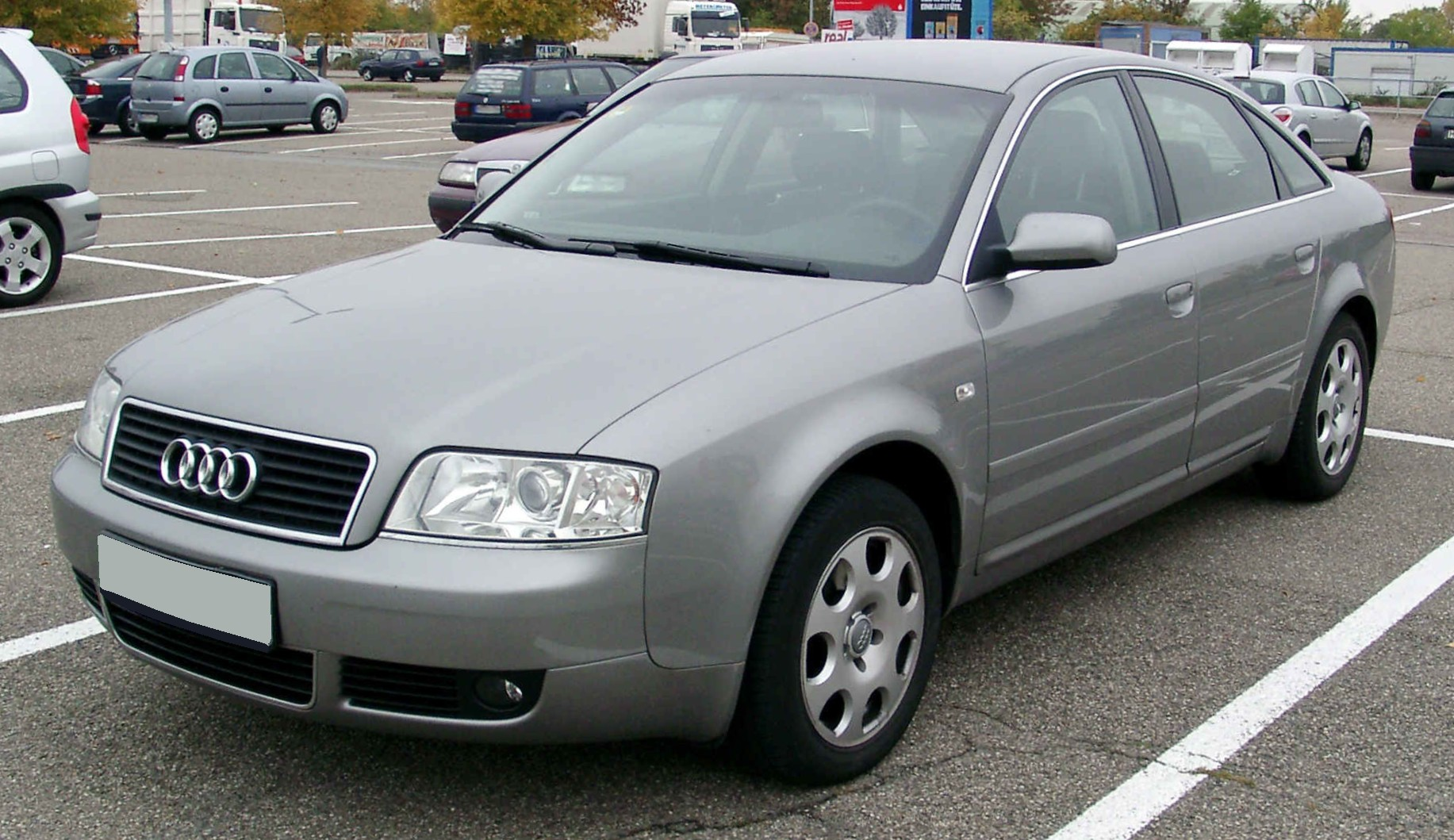

Overview
- Model code: 4B
- Production: 1997 – 2005
- Assembly: Germany: Neckarsulm; Poland: Poznań; China: Changchun (FAW-VW); Thailand: Bangkok
- Designer: Claus Potthoff (1992, 1994); Hartmut Warkuß (1994)

Body and chassis
- Platform: Volkswagen Group C5
- Related: Audi S6 (Typ 4B, 2001–2003); Audi RS6 (Typ 4B, 2002–2004)

Powertrain
- Engine: petrol; 1.8 L 20v I4; 1.8 L turbo 20v I4; 2.0 L 20v I4; 2.4 L 30v V6; 2.7 L turbo 30v V6; 2.8 L 30v V6; 3.0 L 30v V6; 4.2 L 40v V8; 4.2 L turbo 40v V8 (RS6); diesel; 1.9 L TDI I4; 2.5 L TDI 24v V6
- Transmission: 5-speed manual 6-speed manual 4-speed automatic 5-speed automatic multitronic CVT; 5-speed automatic with tiptronic

Dimensions
- Wheelbase: 2,760 mm (108.7 in)
- Length: 4,805 mm (189.2 in)
- Width: 1,810 mm (71.3 in)
- Height: saloon: 1,453 mm (57.2 in); Avant: 1,479 mm (58.2 in)
- Kerb weight: 1,480 kg (3,262.8 lb)

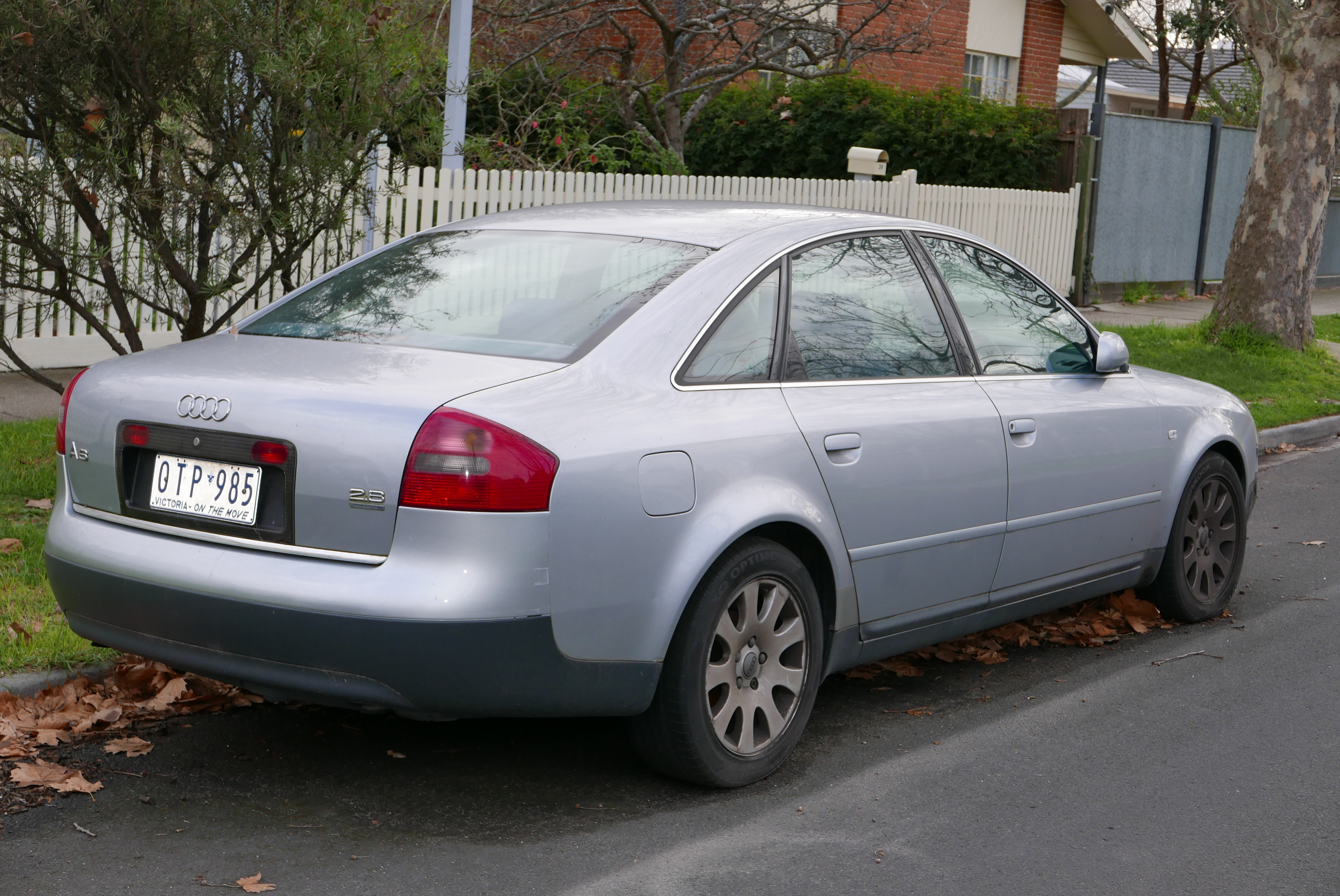
Sedan

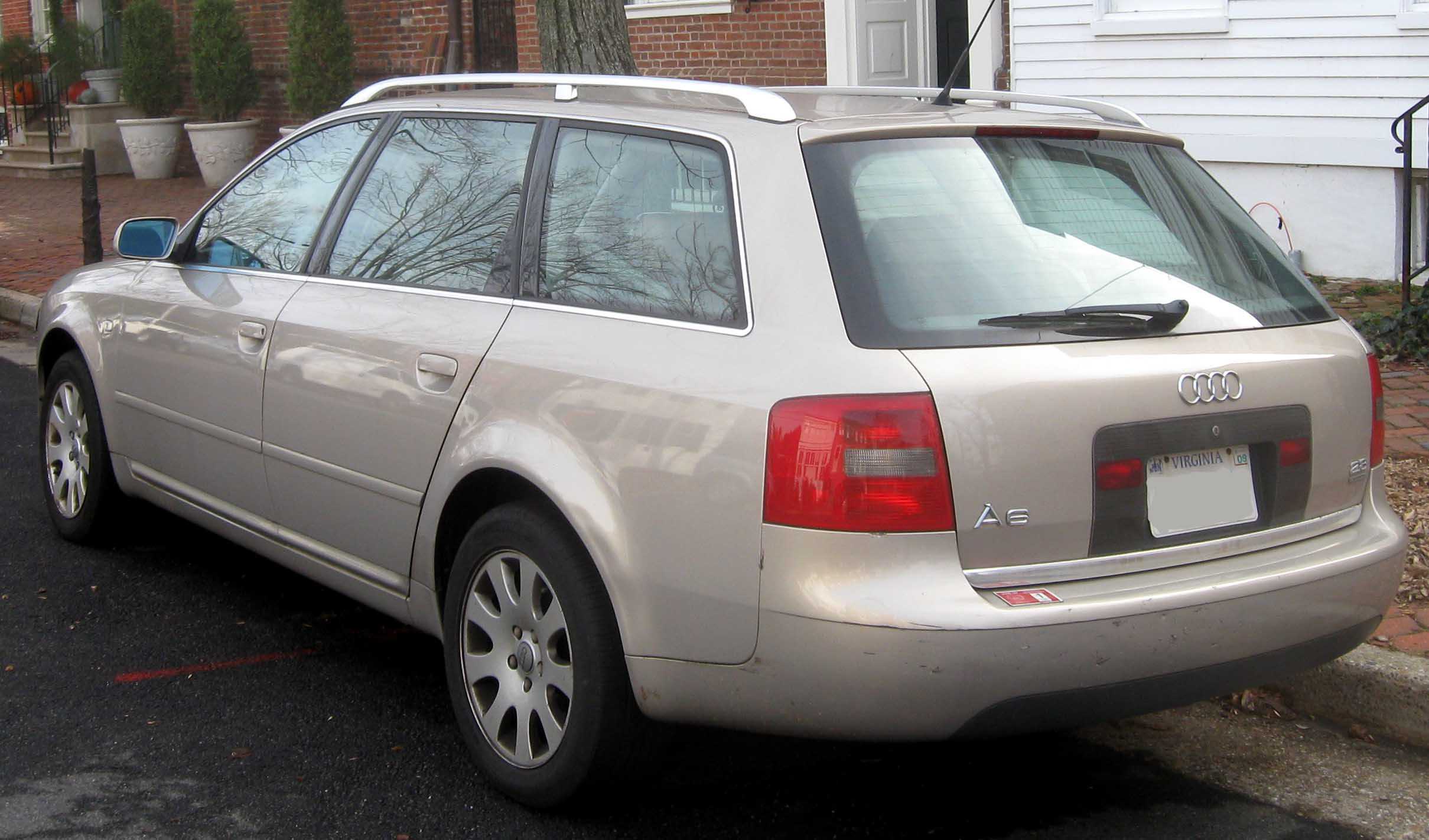
Avant

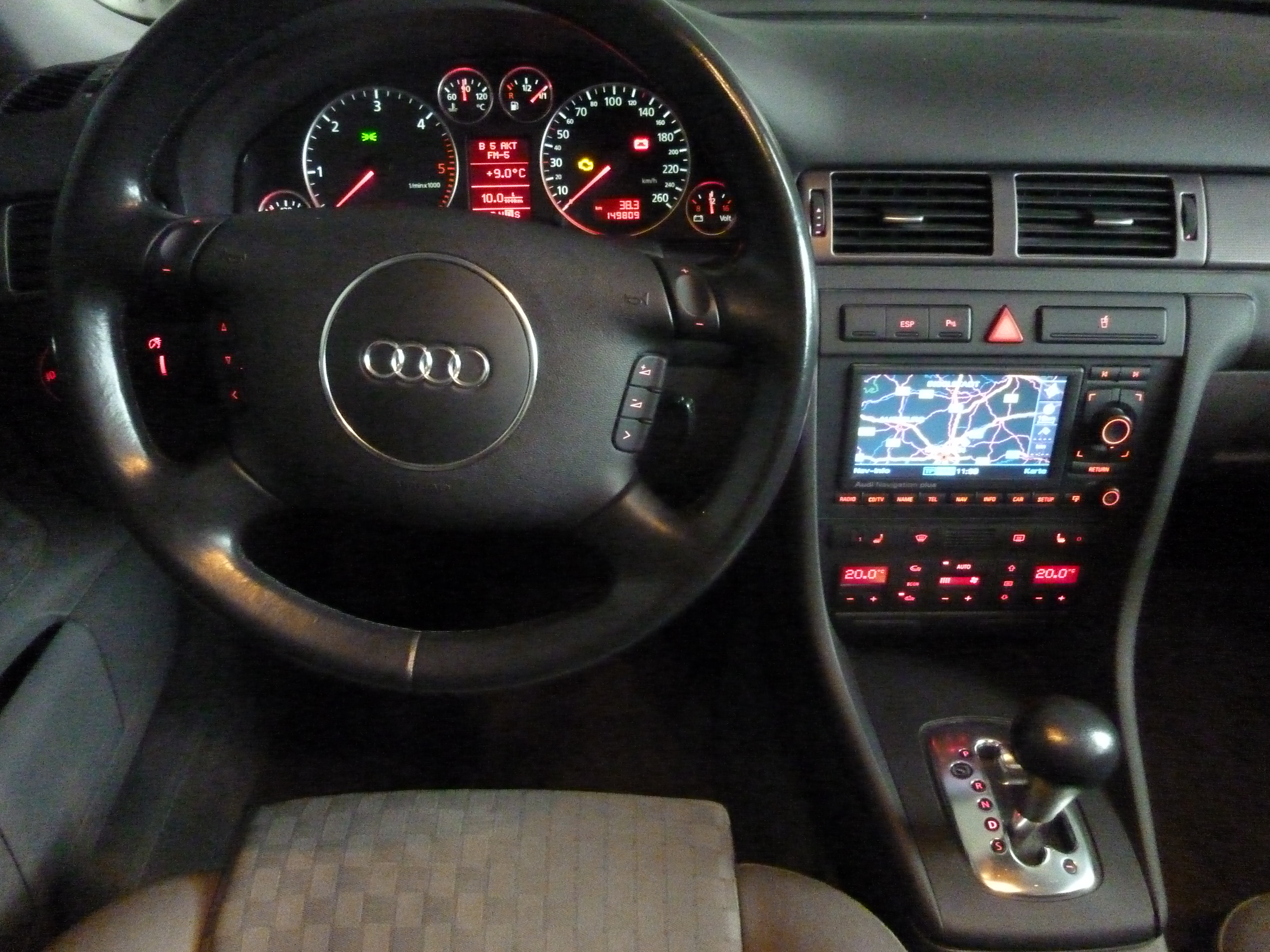
Interior

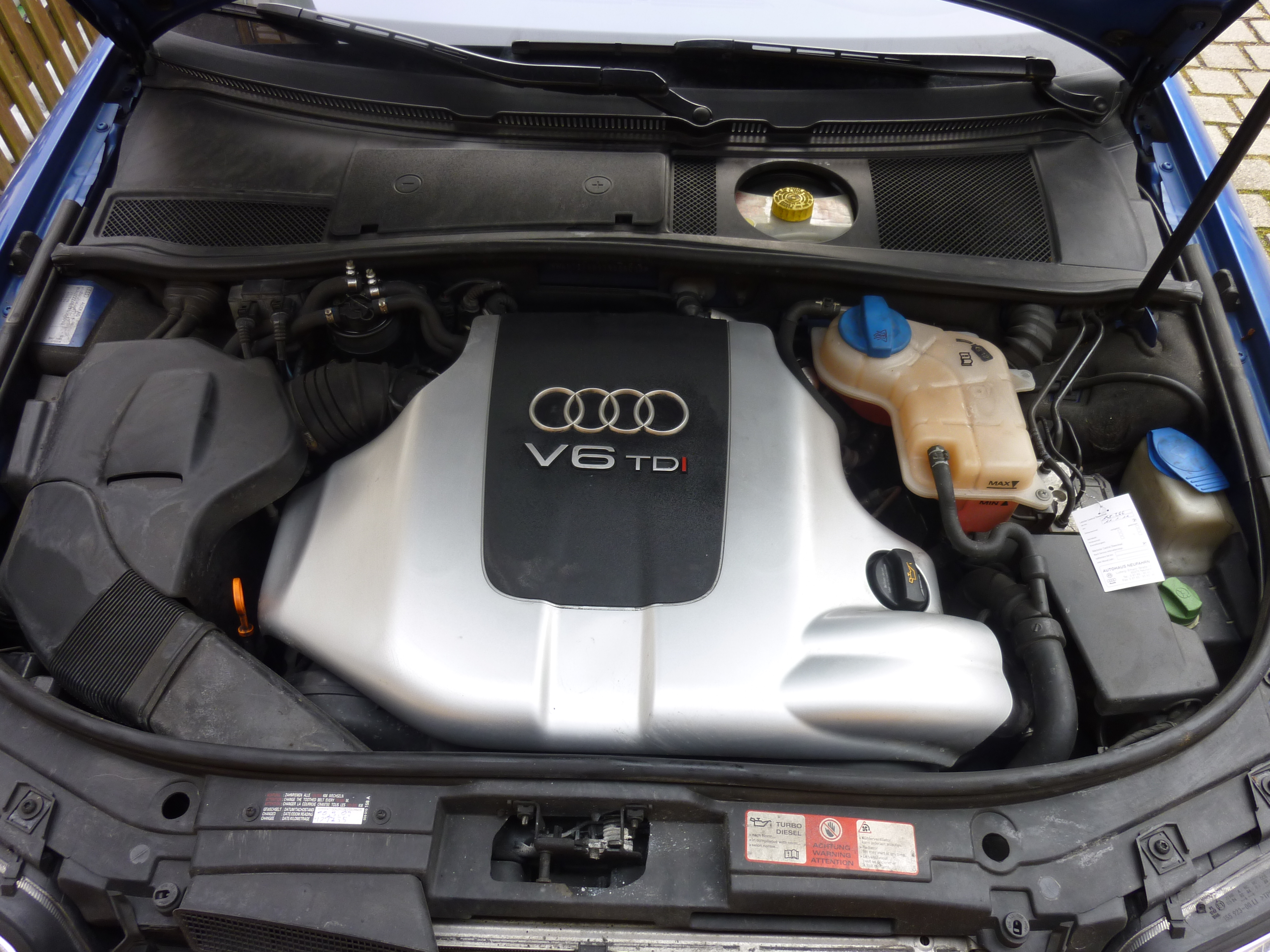
2.5 V6 TDI

In February 1997, the introduction of a new A6 (Typ 4B), based on a new design automobile platform – the Volkswagen Group C5 platform, with a new range of engines was announced and appeared in March at the 1997 Geneva Motor Show. This A6 was marketed in the same categories as the BMW 5 Series and the Mercedes-Benz E-Class. The redesigned body had a coefficient of drag of 0.28.

In 2000 and 2001, the "C5" A6 was on Car and Driver magazine's Ten Best list. This A6 was available with 30-valve 2.4- and 2.8-litre V6 engines, with numerous other engine configurations available globally. As an alternative to the manual transmission, a five-speed tiptronic automatic transmission was also available.

The C5 saloon variant arrived in mid-1997 in Europe, late 1997 in North America and Australia, and the Avant in 1998. In Canada, there was no Avant (Audi's name for an estate/wagon) available at all in 1998 – Audi dropped the C4 Avant at the end of the 1997 model year, and jumped straight to the C5 Avant in 1998 in conjunction with its release in the US. In compliance with federal standards, North American models were equipped with front and rear bumpers that protruded several inches further than their European counterparts, with modified brackets and bumper suspension assemblies as result, and child-seat tethers for occupant safety. In compliance with Canadian law, Canadian models received daytime running lights as standard equipment. North American C5 A6 models received the 2.8-litre, 30-valve V6 engine, the 2.7-litre "Biturbo" V6 also found in the B5 platform S4, developing 250 PS (184 kW; 247 hp), and the 4.2-litre 40-valve V8 petrol engine with 221 kW (300 PS; 296 hp); the two more powerful engines were only offered with quattro permanent four-wheel drive. The V8 models arrived with significantly altered exterior body panels, with slightly more flared wheel arches (fenders), revised headlamps and grille design (before being introduced in 2002 to all other A6 models), larger wheels (8Jx17-inch), larger brakes, and Torsen-based Quattro permanent four-wheel-drive as standard.

In 2002, the A6 received a facelift, with revised headlight and grille design, exposed exhaust tips, and slight changes to accessory body moldings, and tail light colour from red to amber in North American models. A new host of engines were also introduced. The 1.8-litre engine was deleted and replaced by a 2.0-litre powerplant with 96 kW (130 PS; 128 hp). The 1.9-litre Turbocharged Direct Injection (TDI) was tweaked to produce a maximum power output of 96 kW (130 PS; 128 hp), and 310 N⋅m (229 lb⋅ft) of torque, and was mated to a six-speed manual gearbox. The 2.4-litre V6 was named the BDV 30 valves and gained an extra 5 hp and better balancing, and the 2.8-litre V6 engine was replaced by a 3.0-litre engine with 162 kW (220 PS; 217 bhp). The turbocharged 2.7-litre was revised, resulting in 184 kW (250 PS; 247 bhp) and 330 N⋅m (243 lb⋅ft), controlled by standard quattro system. The V6 diesel was also slightly modified resulting in 120 kW (163 PS; 161 bhp) (after the second modification) and 350 N⋅m (258 lb⋅ft). A new more powerful V6 diesel was also introduced with 132 kW (180 PS; 178 hp) and 370 N⋅m (273 lb⋅ft). The 4.2-litre V8 engine which arrived in 2001 remained unchanged.

Also new was the multitronic continuously variable transmission, available in most front-wheel drive models. All models, except the 2.0-litre petrol and 1.9-litre TDI, were available with Audi's trademark four-wheel-drive system, Quattro. A four-wheel-drive version of the Avant, with raised ground clearance and slightly altered styling, was sold as the Audi allroad quattro.

The second-generation A6 was on Car and Driver magazine's Ten Best list for 2000 and 2001. The updated 2005 A6 won the World Car of the Year award for 2005. In addition, the facelifted third-generation A6 3.0T won two Car and Driver "comparos" that pitted it against other sedans like the BMW 5 Series, Mercedes-Benz E-Class, Jaguar XF, and Infiniti M.

A long wheelbase version of the A6 C5 was available in China for the first time, making this model the first stretched German sedan developed especially for that country.

Crash testing
EuroNCAP adult occupant:	3/5 stars
IIHS overall frontal offset crash test:	Acceptable

=== S6 and RS 6 ===
The Audi S6 is a high-powered variant of the A6, featuring a modified version of the 4.2-litre V8 engine producing 250 kW (340 PS; 335 bhp) and 420 N⋅m (310 lb⋅ft). It was available as a saloon and Avant although the Avant version was the only one sold in North America.

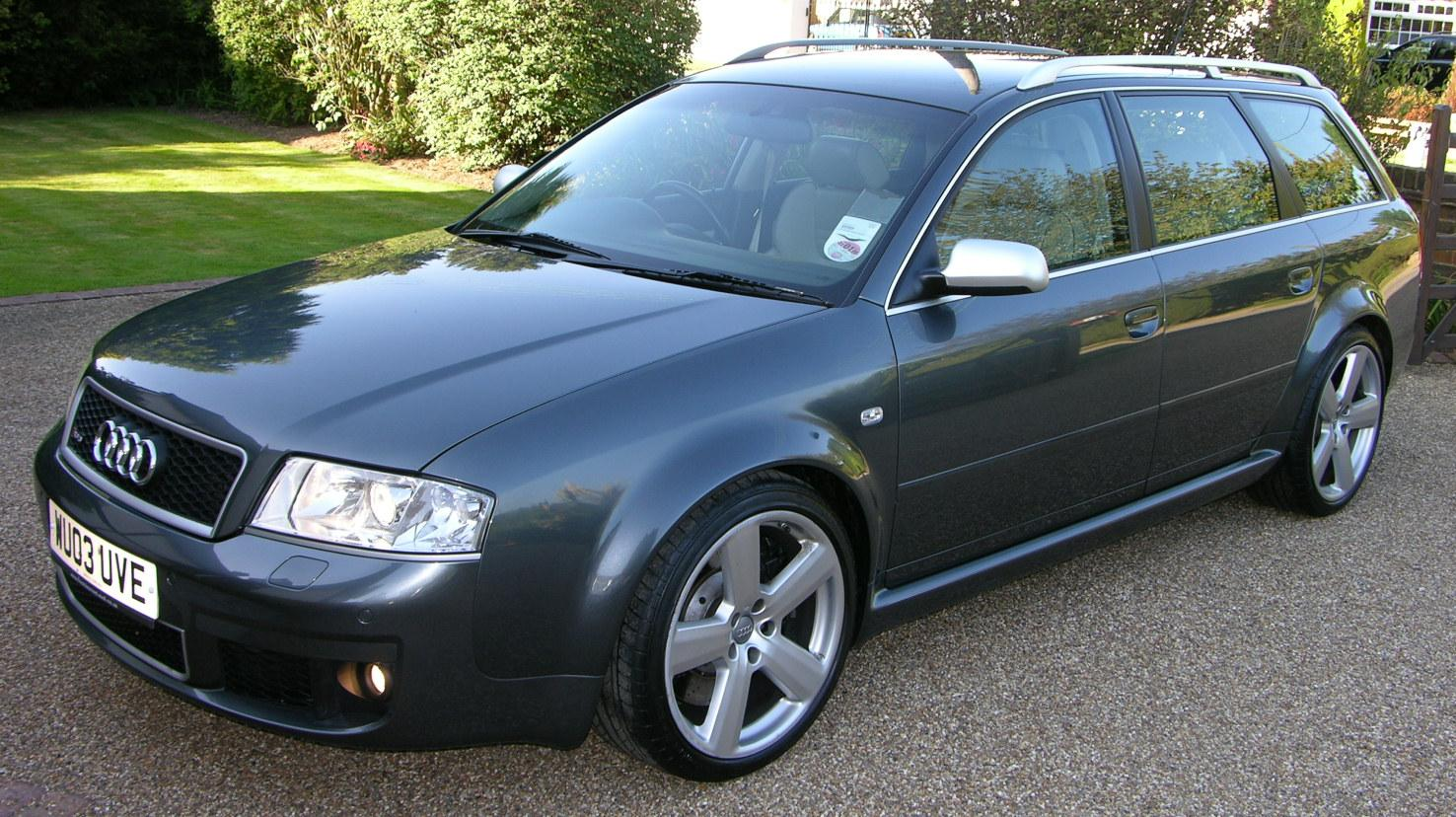
Audi RS 6 Avant

In the late years of the A6 C5 design, a higher-performance limited-run Audi RS 6 model was presented. Weighing in excess of 1,840 kg (4,057 lb) and producing 331 kW (450 PS; 444 bhp) and 560 N⋅m (413 lbf⋅ft), the RS 6 was capable of 0-100 km/h (62.1 mph) in 4.5 seconds, and on to 200 km/h (124.3 mph) in under 17 seconds. Initially available as only an Avant, a saloon variant was later added; the saloon version being the only version available to the North American market. The RS 6 saloon finished first in a May 2003 Car and Driver comparison test against the BMW M5 (E39), Mercedes-Benz E 55 AMG (W211), and Jaguar S-Type R.

=== allroad quattro (1999–2005) ===
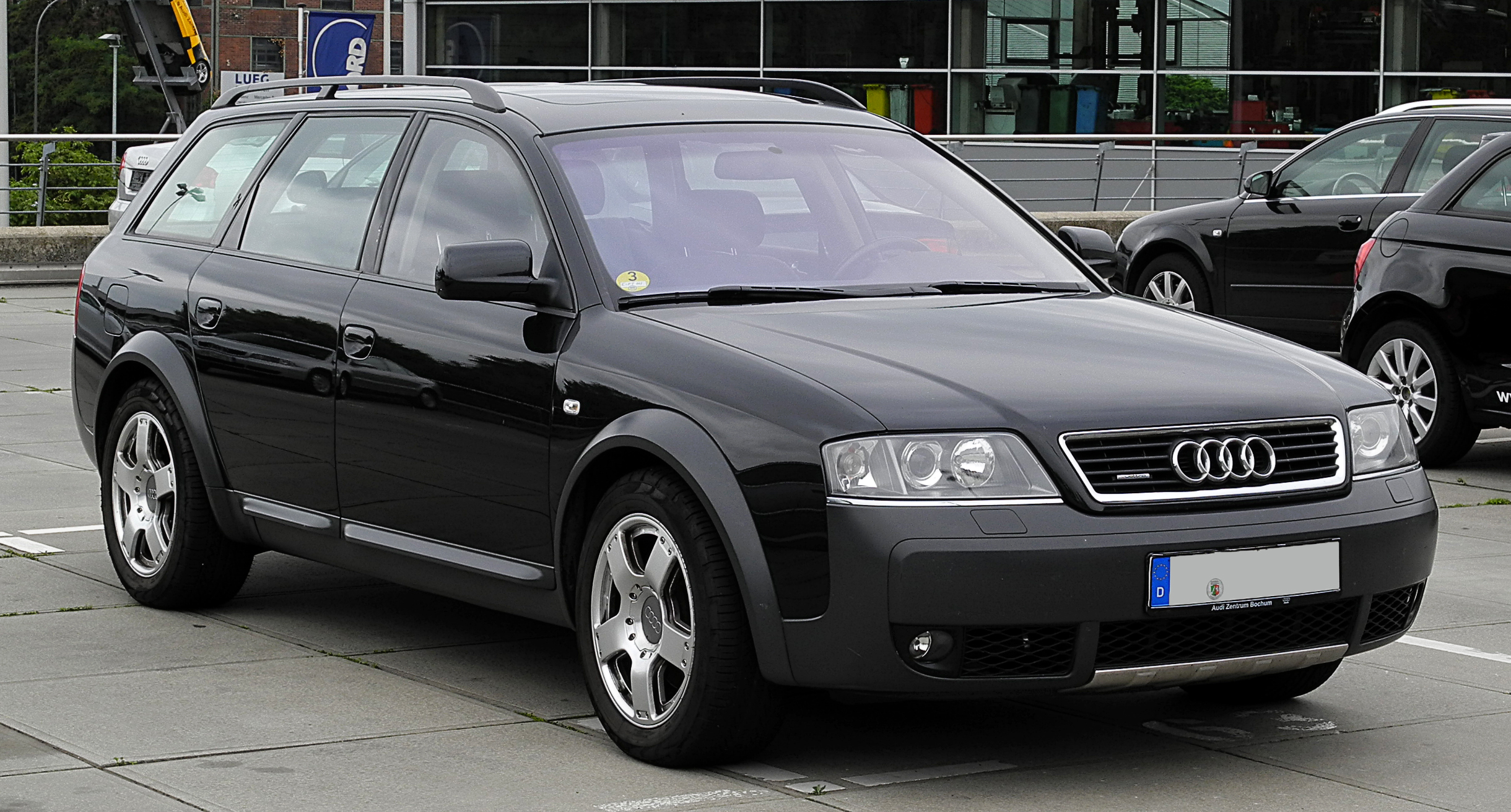
Audi allroad quattro 2.5 TDI (Germany)

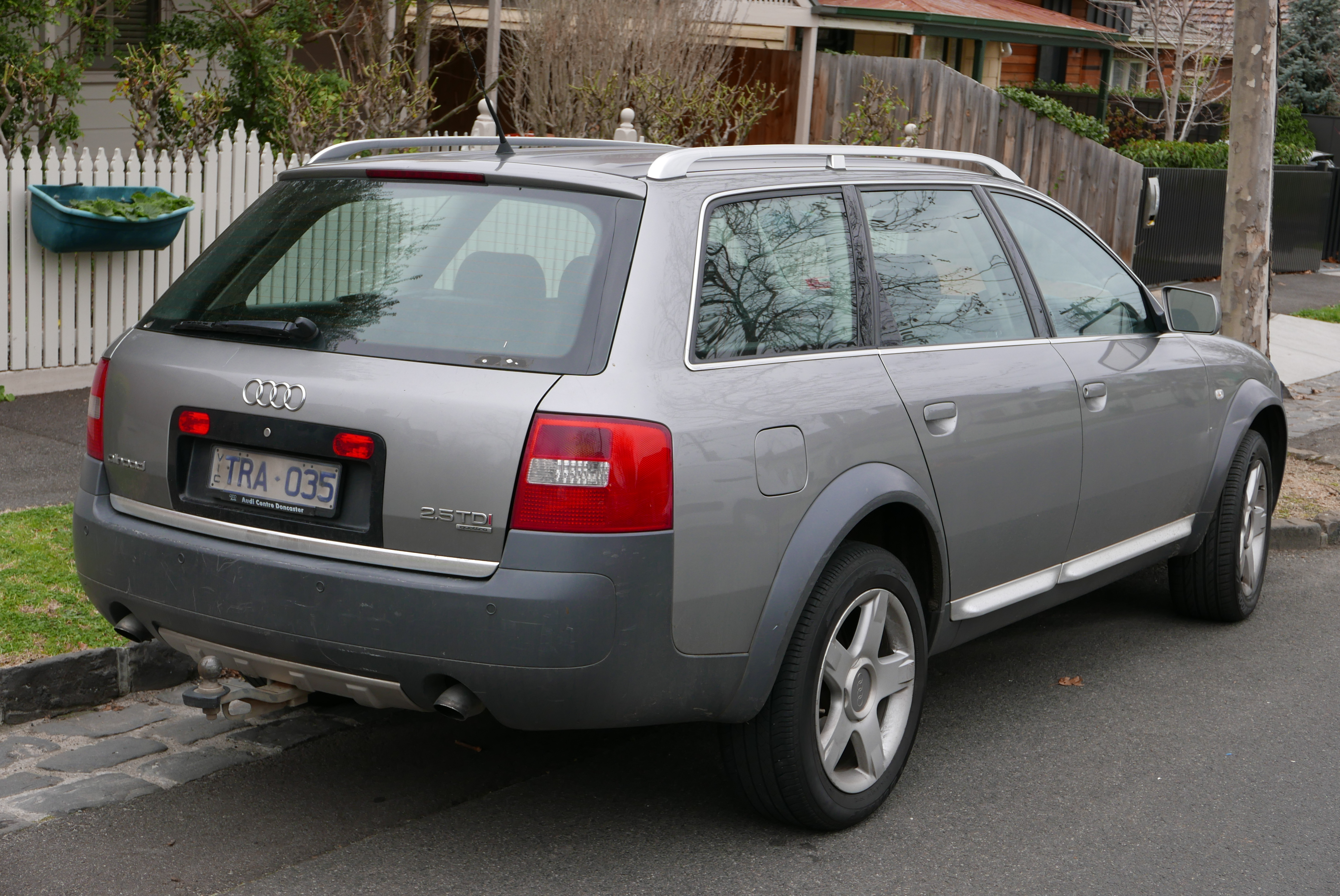
Audi allroad quattro 2.5 TDI (Australia)

Audi's C5 series A6 Avant formed the basis for a semi-offroad model in 1999, labeled "Audi allroad quattro". Compared to the regular A6, the allroad featured an advanced air suspension system, allowing for increased ground clearance; larger diameter all-terrain tyres, and flared fenders and bumpers with matte finish, giving it a distinct appearance and more overall flexibility over varying terrain. The allroad's ride height was also increased with 25 mm subframe spacers; and overall frame stiffness increased with reinforced welds on the subframe mounts and A, B, and C pillars, the floor pan being produced with 20% thicker steel. As the name "allroad Quattro" suggests, Audi's Torsen-based quattro permanent four-wheel-drive system was standard equipment for all versions.

The standard adjustable air suspension system can lift the car high enough to provide 208 mm (8.2 in) of ground clearance; a low-range mode (an option with manual transmission), absent from other Quattro-equipped vehicles, can be selected with the touch of a button. When used together, the two systems made it possible for the allroad to complete an official Land Rover test-course, thus far it is the only car-based SUV that has been proven capable of doing so in testing. Conversely, the air suspension can lower the vehicle down to only 142 mm (5.6 in) above road level, and simultaneously stiffen the spring and damper rates to provide a sporty driving experience, much like that of the conventional A6 with the sports suspension.

Audi's 2.7-litre, biturbo V6 petrol engine with 250 PS (184 kW; 247 hp) and 350 N⋅m (258 lb⋅ft) of peak torque was available initially, alongside the 2.5-litre TDI diesel unit with 180 PS (132 kW; 178 hp) and 370 N⋅m (273 lb⋅ft) of torque. A variant of the corporate 4.2-litre V8 petrol engine was made available in 2003, and a less powerful TDI (163 bhp) followed in 2004.

Audi stopped production of the allroad in July 2005. Although the model continued to be available for sale throughout 2006 in Europe, there was no 2006 model year for North America.

With the return of the "allroad" nameplate to North America, in the form of the 2013 A4 allroad Quattro, the C5-Platform allroad Quattro has begun to take the name "Ur-allroad." The 'Ur-' is used in the German language, as a prefix to signify 'ancient' or 'early ancestor' (e.g., great-grandmother is Urgroßmutter), and is used informally by car enthusiasts worldwide to refer to the original Audi Quattro that was produced from 1980 to 1991 (the "Ur-Quattro"). The use of the term was then extended to the original S4 and S6 models to differentiate them from later models with the same name, and more recently to the C5 allroad models ("Ur-allroad").

=== C5 engines ===
The C5 design was available with the following engines:

Model designation	Engine code	Displacement	engine configuration	Max. motive power at rpm (Directive 80/1269/EEC)	Max. torque at rpm	0–100 km/h (62 mph)	Top speed (saloon)	Years
Petrol engines all multi-point sequential fuel injection
1.8	AJP, AQE, ARH	1,781 cc (108.7 cu in)	I4 DOHC 20v	92 kW (125 PS; 123 hp) at 5,800	168 N⋅m (124 lb⋅ft) at 3,500	11.3 sec	203 km/h (126 mph)	1997–2001
1.8 T	AEB, APU, ANB, AWT, ARK	1,781 cc (108.7 cu in)	I4 DOHC 20v	110 kW (150 PS; 148 hp) at 5,700	210 N⋅m (155 lb⋅ft) at 1,750–4,600	9.4 sec	217 km/h (135 mph)	1997–2005
1.8 T	AJL	1,781 cc (108.7 cu in)	I4 DOHC 20v	132 kW (180 PS; 178 hp) at 5,500	230 N⋅m (170 lb⋅ft) at 1,750–4,600	8.5 sec	230 km/h (143 mph)	1997–2001
2.0	ALT	1,984 cc (121.1 cu in)	I4 DOHC 20v	96 kW (130 PS; 128 hp) at 5,700	195 N⋅m (144 lb⋅ft) at 3,300	10.5 sec	205 km/h (127 mph)	2001–2005
2.4	AGA, AML, APS, ALF, ARJ	2,393 cc (146.0 cu in)	V6 DOHC 30v	121 kW (165 PS; 162 hp) at 6,000	230 N⋅m (170 lb⋅ft) at 3,200	9.1 sec	222 km/h (138 mph)	1997–2001
2.4	BDV	2,393 cc (146.0 cu in)	V6 DOHC 30v	125 kW (170 PS; 168 hp) at 6,000	230 N⋅m (170 lb⋅ft) at 3,200	9.3 sec	224 km/h (139 mph)	2001–2005
2.7 T	AJK, AZA	2,671 cc (163.0 cu in)	V6 DOHC 30v	169 kW (230 PS; 227 hp) at 5,800	310 N⋅m (229 lb⋅ft) at 1,700–4,600	7.3 sec	245 km/h (152 mph)	1999–2001
2.7 T	ARE, BES, APB, BEL	2,671 cc (163.0 cu in)	V6 DOHC 30v	184 kW (250 PS; 247 hp) at 5,800	350 N⋅m (258 lb⋅ft) at 1,800–4,500	6.8 sec	248 km/h (154 mph)	2000–2005
2.7 T	ARE, BES, APB, BEL	2,671 cc (163.0 cu in)	V6 DOHC 30v	195 kW (265 PS; 261 hp) at 5,800	380 N⋅m (280 lb⋅ft) at 1,800–4,500	6.6 sec	248 km/h (154 mph)	2004
2.8	ACK, APR, AMX, AQD, ALG	2,771 cc (169.1 cu in)	V6 DOHC 30v	142 kW (193 PS; 190 hp) at 6,000	280 N⋅m (207 lb⋅ft) at 3,200	8.1 sec	236 km/h (147 mph)	1997–2001
3.0	AVK	2,976 cc (181.6 cu in)	V6 DOHC 30v	162 kW (220 PS; 217 hp) at 6,300	300 N⋅m (221 lb⋅ft) at 3,200	7.5 sec	243 km/h (151 mph)	2001–2005
4.2	ARS, ASG, BAS	4,172 cc (254.6 cu in)	V8 DOHC 40v	221 kW (300 PS; 296 hp) at 6,200	400 N⋅m (295 lb⋅ft) at 3,000–4,000	6.9 sec	250 km/h (155 mph) (elec. limited)	1999–2005
S6	AQJ, ANK	4,172 cc (254.6 cu in)	V8 DOHC 40v	250 kW (340 PS; 335 hp) at 7,000	420 N⋅m (310 lb⋅ft) at 3,400	5.7 sec	250 km/h (155 mph) (elec. limited)	1999–2005
RS6	BCY	4,172 cc (254.6 cu in)	V8 DOHC 40v	331 kW (450 PS; 444 hp) at 5,700–6,400	560 N⋅m (413 lb⋅ft) at 1,950–5,500	4.9 sec	287 km/h (178 mph) (unlimited)	2002–2005
RS6 plus	BRV	4,172 cc (254.6 cu in)	V8 DOHC 40v	353 kW (480 PS; 473 hp) at 6,000–6,400	560 N⋅m (413 lb⋅ft) at 1,950–6,000	4.5 sec	294 km/h (183 mph) (unlimited)	2004–2005
Diesel engines
1.9 TDI	AFN, AVG	1,896 cc (115.7 cu in)	I4 SOHC 8v	81 kW (110 PS; 109 hp) at 4,150	235 N⋅m (173 lb⋅ft) at 1,900	12.3 sec	194 km/h (121 mph)	1997–2001
1.9 TDI	AJM	1,896 cc (115.7 cu in)	I4 SOHC 8v	85 kW (116 PS; 114 hp) at 4,000	285 N⋅m (210 lb⋅ft) at 1,900	11.6 sec	196 km/h (122 mph)	1998–2001
1.9 TDI	AWX	1,896 cc (115.7 cu in)	I4 SOHC 8v	96 kW (130 PS; 128 hp) at 4,000	285 N⋅m (210 lb⋅ft) at 1,750–2,500	10.5 sec	203 km/h (126 mph)	2001–2005
1.9 TDI	AVF	1,896 cc (115.7 cu in)	I4 SOHC 8v	96 kW (130 PS; 128 hp) at 4,000	310 N⋅m (229 lb⋅ft) at 1,900	10.5 sec	203 km/h (126 mph)	2001–2005
2.5 TDI	AFB, AKN	2,496 cc (152.3 cu in)	V6 DOHC 24v	110 kW (150 PS; 148 hp) at 4,000	310 N⋅m (229 lb⋅ft) at 1,500–3,200	9.7 sec	218 km/h (135 mph)	1997–2001
2.5 TDI	AYM	2,496 cc (152.3 cu in)	V6 DOHC 24v	114 kW (155 PS; 153 hp) at 4,000	310 N⋅m (229 lb⋅ft) at 1,400–3,500	9.7 sec	219 km/h (136 mph)	2001–2002
2.5 TDI	BFC, BCZ	2,496 cc (152.3 cu in)	V6 DOHC 24v	120 kW (163 PS; 161 hp) at 4,000	310 N⋅m (229 lb⋅ft) at 1,400–3,600	9.3 sec	222 km/h (138 mph)	2002–2005
2.5 TDI	BDG	2,496 cc (152.3 cu in)	V6 DOHC 24v	120 kW (163 PS; 161 hp) at 4,000	350 N⋅m (258 lb⋅ft) at 1,500–3,000	9.3 sec	222 km/h (138 mph)	2003–2005
2.5 TDI	AKE, BDH, BAU	2,496 cc (152.3 cu in)	V6 DOHC 24v	132 kW (180 PS; 178 hp) at 4,000	370 N⋅m (273 lb⋅ft) at 1,500–2,500	8.9 sec	221 km/h (137 mph)	1999–2005

== C6 (Typ 4F, 2004) ==
Third generation (C6)
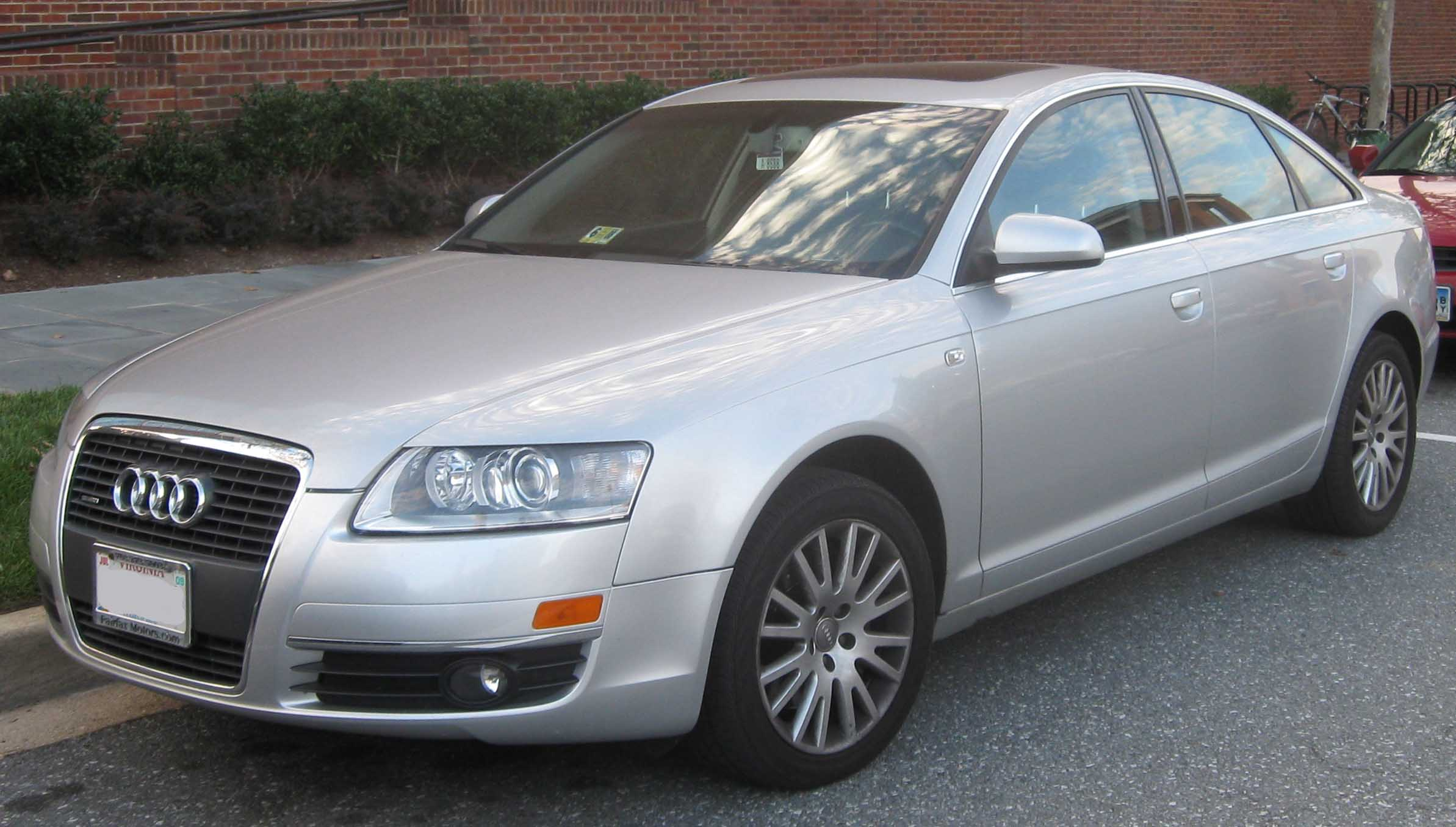
- Pre-facelift Audi A6 3.2 sedan (US)

Overview
- Model code: 4F
- Production: February 2004 – June 2011 (Germany); 2006–2012 (China)
- Model years: 2005–2011
- Assembly: Germany: Neckarsulm; India: Aurangabad (Audi India); China: Changchun (FAW-VW)
- Designer: Satoshi Wada (2001)

Body and chassis
- Platform: Volkswagen Group C6 platform
- Related: Audi S6 (2006–2011); Audi RS6 (2008–2010)

Powertrain
- Engine: 2.0 L I4 Turbo; 2.4 L V6; 2.8 L V6 FSI; 3.0 L V6 (China); 3.0 L V6 Supercharged; 3.2 L V6 FSI; 4.2 L V8; 5.0 L V10 biturbo 5.2 L V10; 2.0 L I4 TDI; 2.7 L V6 TDI; 3.0 L V6 TDI
- Transmission: 6-speed manual 6-speed tiptronic automatic multitronic CVT

Dimensions
- Wheelbase: 2,843 mm (111.9 in); LWB: 2,945 mm (115.9 in)
- Length: 4,927 mm (194.0 in); LWB: 5,035 mm (198.2 in)
- Width: 1,855 mm (73.0 in)
- Height: saloon: 1,459 mm (57.4 in); Avant: 1,463 mm (57.6 in); LWB: 1,485 mm (58.5 in)
- Kerb weight: 1,520–1,845 kg (3,351.0–4,067.5 lb)

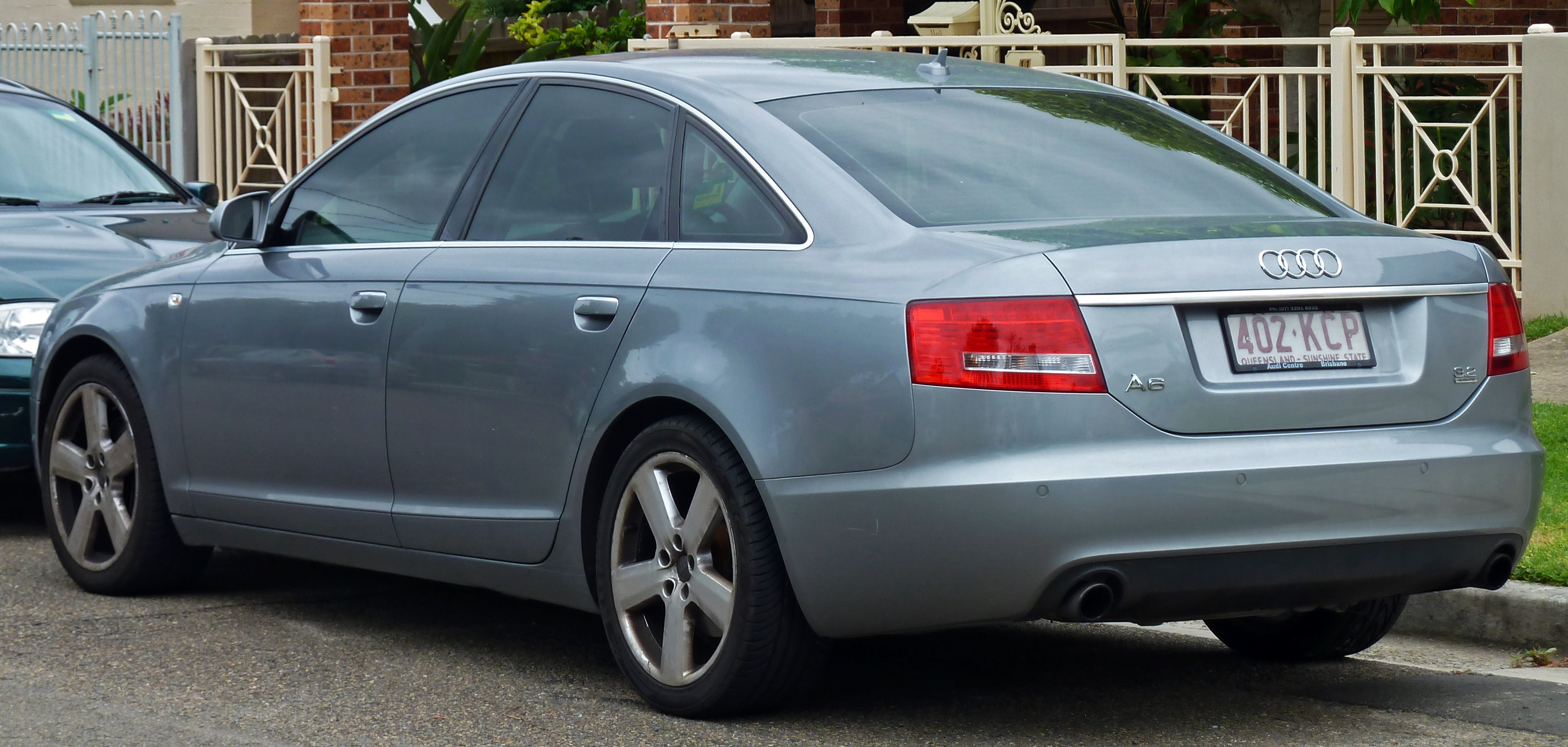
Sedan (pre-facelift)

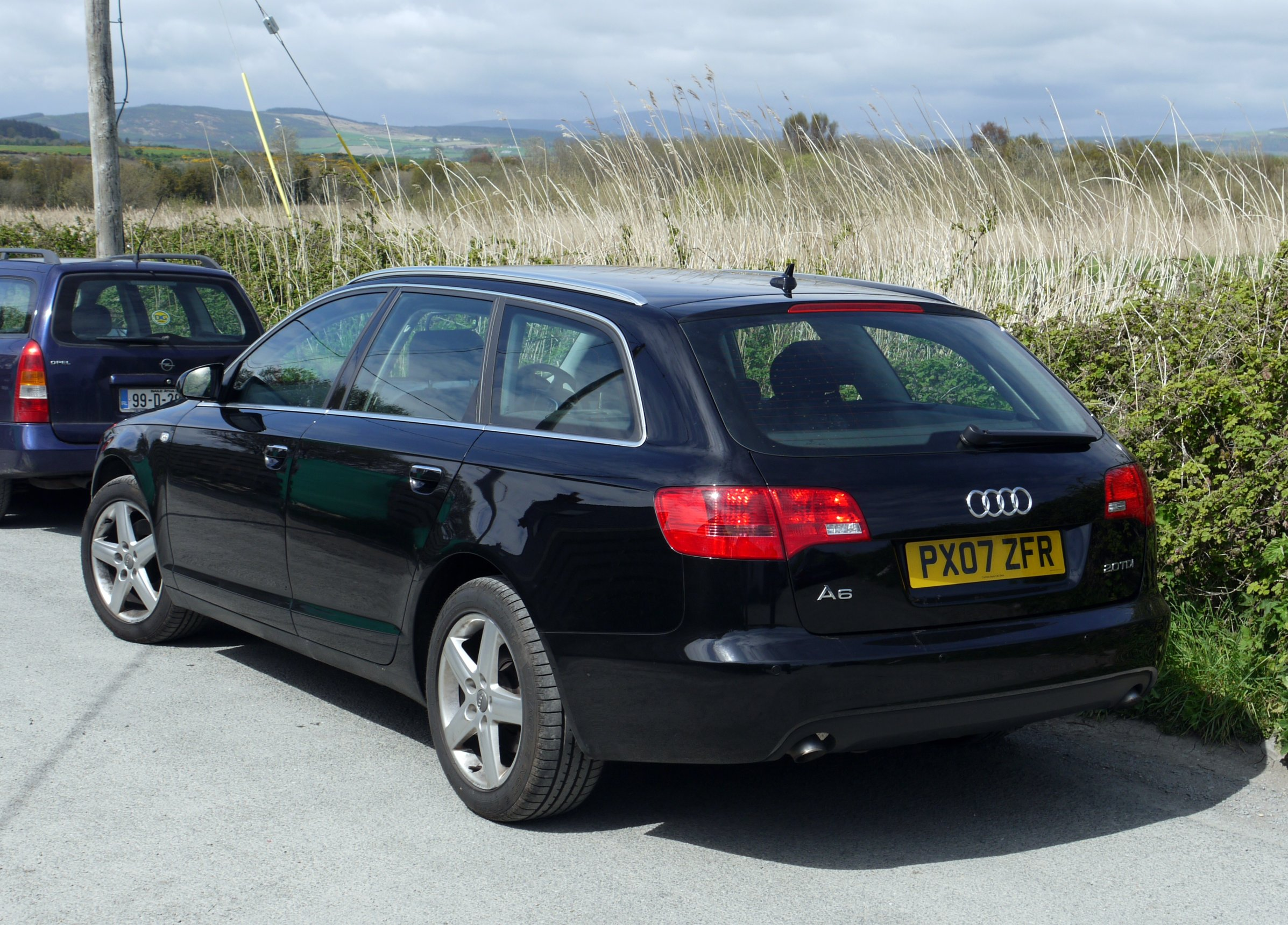
Avant (pre-facelift)

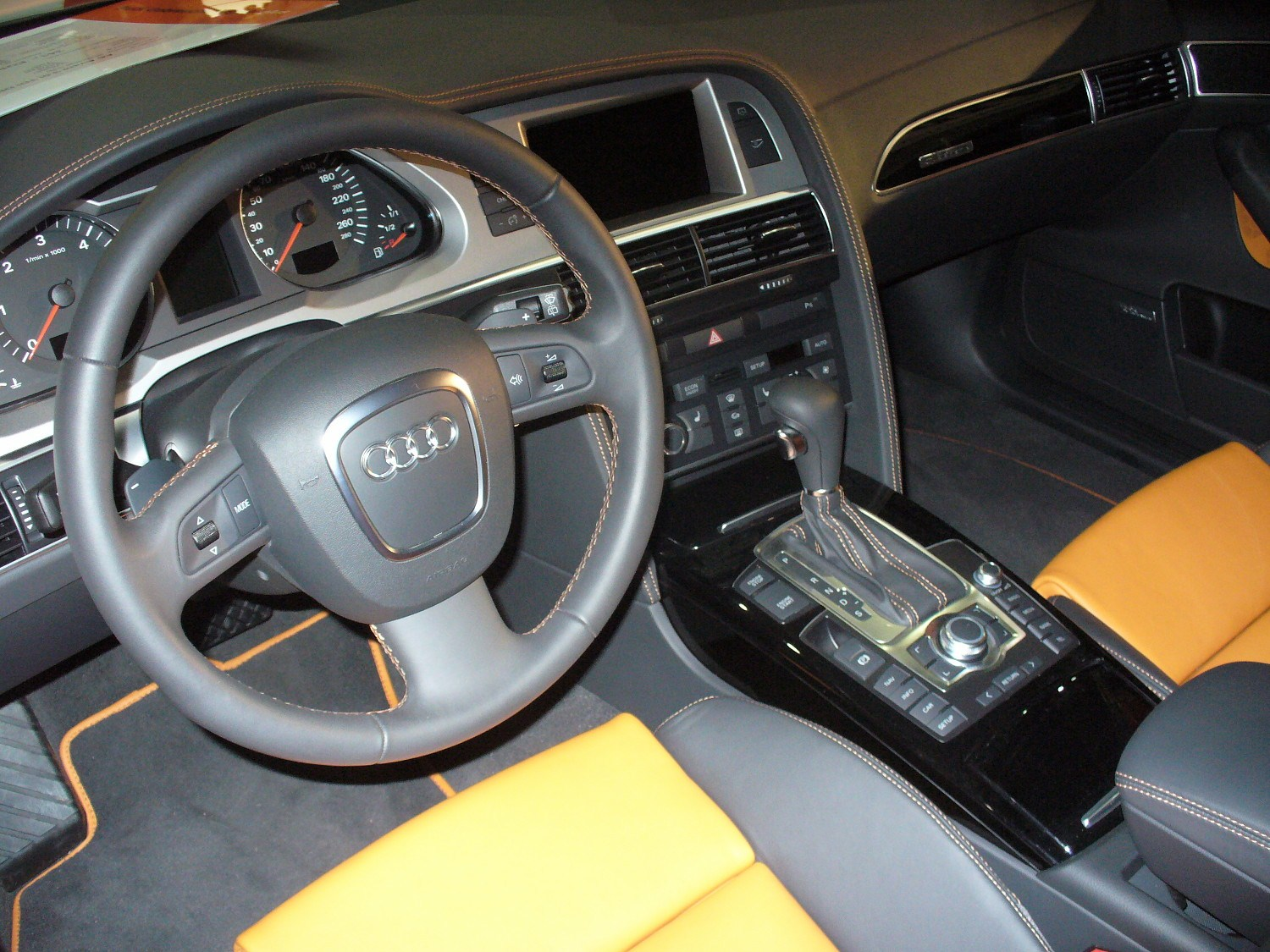
Interior (pre-facelift)

=== Initial release ===
The Typ 4F A6 was released in 2004. Designed by Satoshi Wada in 2001, this model is visually an evolution of the C5, but was lengthened to 4,927 mm (194.0 in), and has the new Audi "single-frame grille". Like other contemporary Audis, the A6 has a "tornado line" that runs from the front lights to the rear lights just below the body shoulders.

The C6 iteration of the A6 features more sophisticated technology. Most notable is the Multi Media Interface (MMI), which is a system controlling in-car entertainment, satellite navigation, climate control, car settings such as suspension configuration and optional electronic accessories through a central screen interface. This has the advantage of minimising the number of buttons normally found on a dashboard by replacing them with controls that operate multiple devices using the integrated display.

On the engines, the new Fuel Stratified Injection (FSI) direct injection technology was introduced. Although the line of engines represents the same progression as the former model, all engines were new. The multitronic continuously variable transmission continues as an alternative for front-wheel-drive models, alongside a new six-speed tiptronic automatic transmission model 09E available in the four-wheel-drive models. Audi's "trademark" Torsen-based Quattro permanent four-wheel-drive is available in most of the lineup, and standard in the most powerful models. Quattro is not available on the Multitronic variants of the A6, but is available on the manual and Tiptronic gear systems. Conversely, the Tiptronic system is not available on the front-wheel-drive variants of the car. The six-speed manual gearbox is available with the 3.2-litre V6 engine, but not for the North American market.

The Avant was previewed by the Audi Avantissimo concept in 2001 and arrived during the course of 2005. The A6 All-road Quattro made its debut in 2006, and as before, is an off-road-ready version of the Avant, available with either a 2.7-litre V6 or 3.0-litre V6 Turbocharged Direct Injection diesel engines, or a 3.2-litre V6 or 4.2-litre V8 petrol engine.

=== A6L (2005–2009) ===
The A6L is a long wheelbase version of the A6 sedan for the Chinese market. The vehicle was unveiled in 2005 at the Shanghai Motor Show.

The vehicles went on sale in the middle of 2005. Early models include A6L 2.4, with A6L 2.0 TFSI (170 PS) followed shortly after. A6L 3.0 Quattro (218 PS) and A6L 4.2 Quattro (335 PS) were introduced in 2005. Other models include A6 3.0.

=== S6 ===
The Audi S6 performance variant was introduced in the Frankfurt Motor Show, and produced from early 2006 until 2011. It is powered by a 5.2-litre Fuel Stratified Injection (FSI) V10 engine producing 320 kW (435 PS; 429 bhp) and 540 N⋅m (398 lbf⋅ft) of torque, a de-tuned engine taken from the Lamborghini Gallardo. The S6 reaches 100 km/h (62.1 mph) from a standstill in 5.2 seconds and a quarter mile in 13.5 seconds.

=== A6 allroad quattro (2006–2011) ===
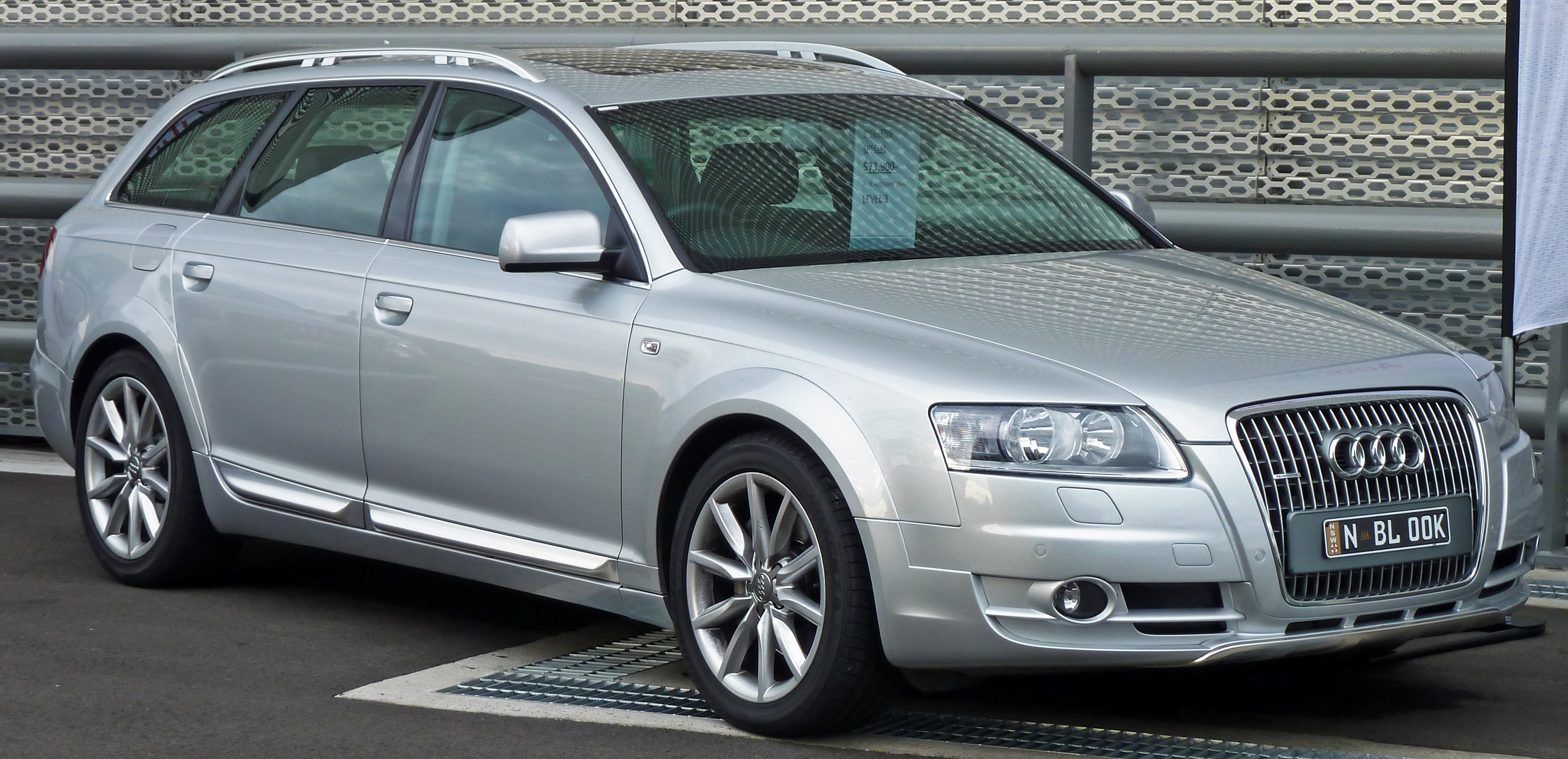
Pre-facelift A6 allroad quattro 3.0 TDI

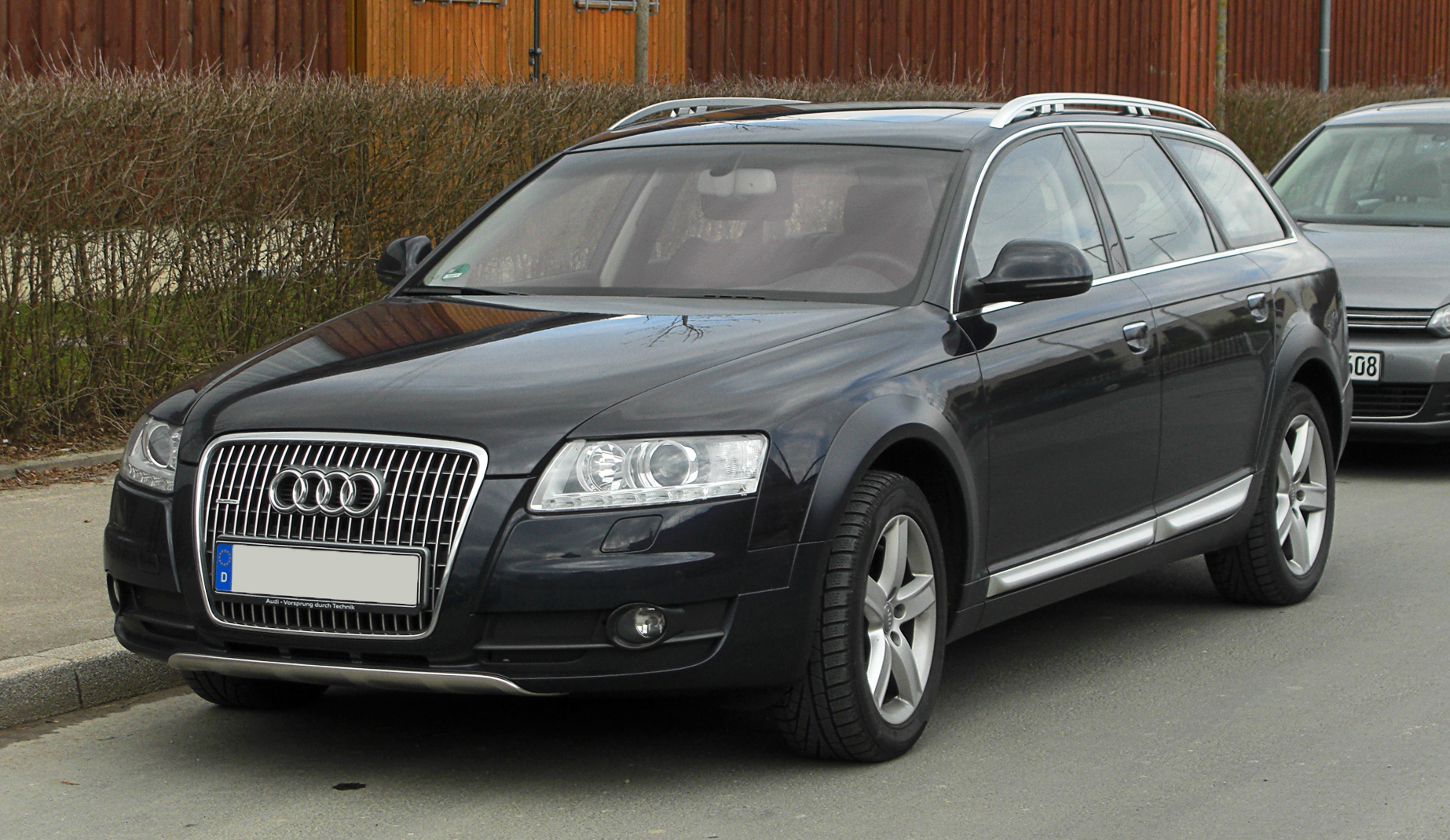
Facelift A6 allroad quattro 3.0 TFSI

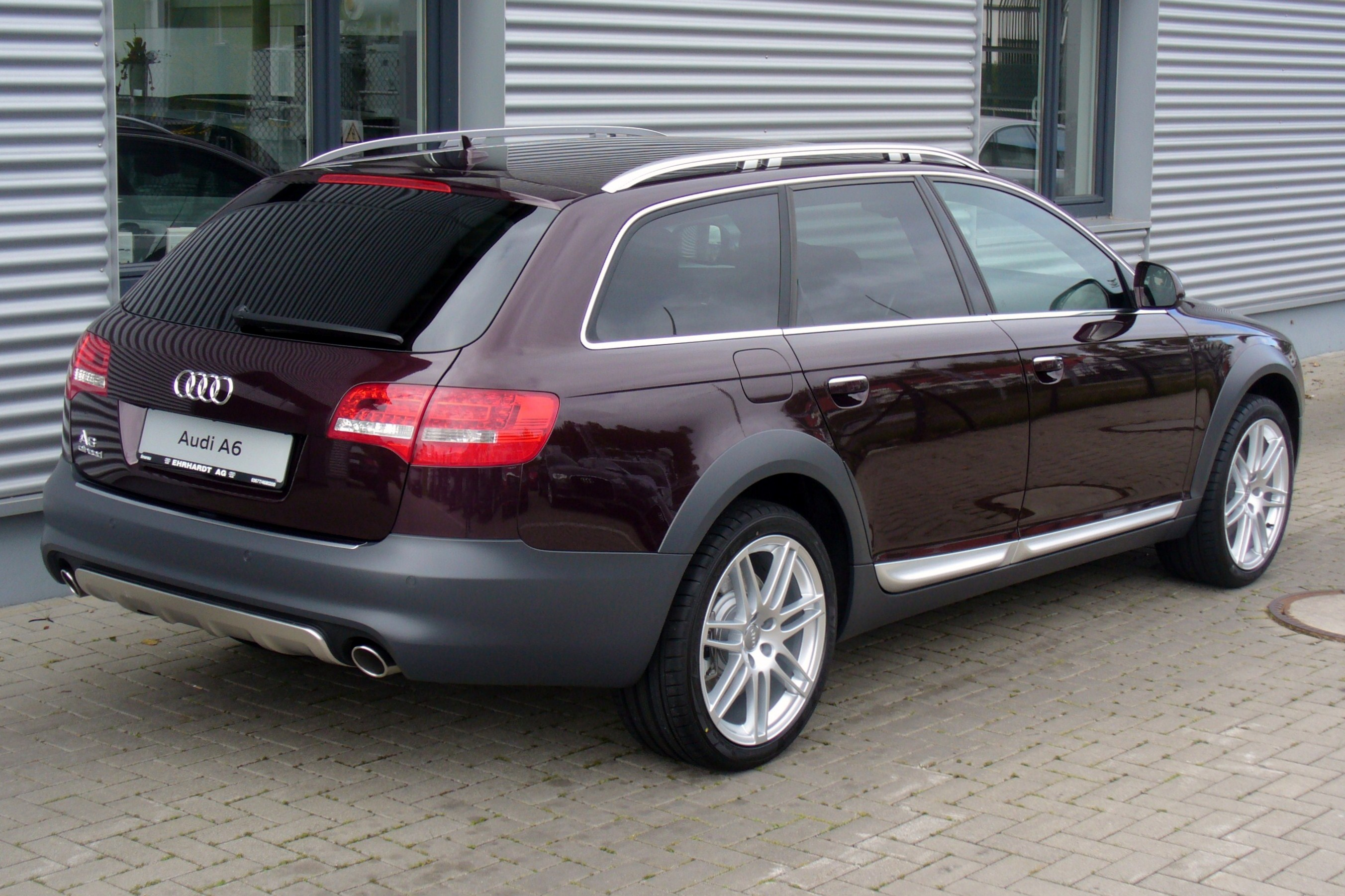
Facelift A6 allroad quattro 3.0 TDI

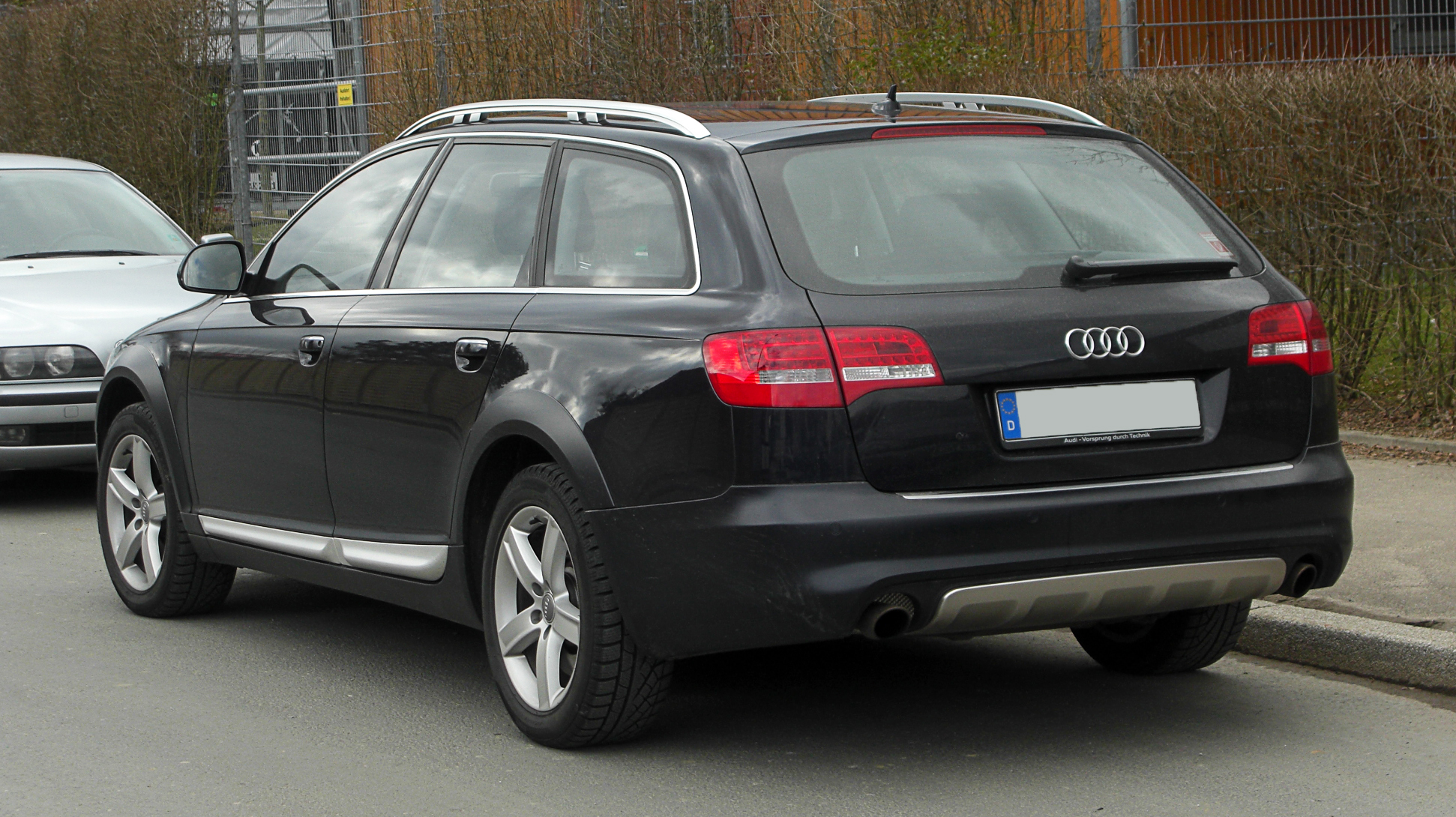
Facelift A6 allroad quattro 3.0 TFSI

Audi announced the C6 series allroad in 2005 and released it the following year. This model was called the Audi A6 allroad quattro (unlike the previous version, the Audi allroad quattro, with no reference to the A6 nomenclature).

The Audi A6 allroad quattro again featured adaptive air suspension and quattro permanent four-wheel drive system. The A6 allroad was powered by a choice of two Fuel Stratified Injection (FSI) petrol engines, a 3.2-litre V6 and a 4.2-litre V8, and two TDI diesel engines, a 180 PS (132 kW) 2.7 L and a 225 PS (165 kW) (233 only in the US) 3.0 L. The tiptronic gearbox is standard on the 4.2 V8 and the 2.7 TDI, but optional on the 3.2 FSI and 3.0 TDI.

The five-mode air suspension can be raised by up to 60 mm (2.36 in) to provide ground clearance of 185 mm (7.28 in) which is better than the older four-mode.

The car featured a number of off-road styling cues including larger bumpers and sills.

=== Engines ===
Model	configuration	Max. motive power	Max. torque
petrol engines
2.0 16v TFSI	Inline 4 DOHC turbo	170 PS (125 kW; 168 hp)	280 N⋅m (207 lb⋅ft)
2.4 24v	V6 DOHC	177 PS (130 kW; 175 hp)	230 N⋅m (170 lb⋅ft)
2.8 24v FSI	V6 DOHC	210 PS (154 kW; 207 hp)	280 N⋅m (207 lb⋅ft)
3.0 24v TFSI	V6 DOHC supercharged	290 PS (213 kW; 286 hp)	420 N⋅m (310 lb⋅ft)
3.2 24v FSI	V6 DOHC	255 PS (188 kW; 252 hp)	330 N⋅m (243 lb⋅ft)
4.2 40v	V8 DOHC	335 PS (246 kW; 330 hp)	420 N⋅m (310 lb⋅ft)
4.2 32v FSI	V8 DOHC	350 PS (257 kW; 345 hp)	440 N⋅m (325 lb⋅ft)
5.2 40v FSI (S6)	V10 DOHC	435 PS (320 kW; 429 hp)	540 N⋅m (398 lb⋅ft)
5.0 40v TFSI (RS6)	V10 DOHC biturbo	580 PS (427 kW; 572 hp)	650 N⋅m (479 lb⋅ft)
diesel engines all Turbocharged Direct Injection (TDI)
2.0 16v TDI	Inline 4 DOHC turbo	140 PS (103 kW; 138 hp)	320 N⋅m (236 lb⋅ft)
2.7 24v TDI	V6 DOHC turbo	163 PS (120 kW; 161 hp); 180 PS (132 kW; 178 hp)	380 N⋅m (280 lb⋅ft)
3.0 24v TDI	V6 DOHC turbo	225 PS (165 kW; 222 hp); 233 PS (171 kW; 230 hp); 239 PS (176 kW; 236 hp)	450 N⋅m (332 lb⋅ft); 450 N⋅m (332 lb⋅ft); 500 N⋅m (369 lb⋅ft)

=== Awards ===
In 2005, the A6 won the World Car of the Year award, and has also won the Practical Caravan "Towcar of the Year" awards, due to its array of towing features such as adjustable suspension height and damping, and the presence of a 123 Trailer Stability Programme.

=== C6 facelift ===
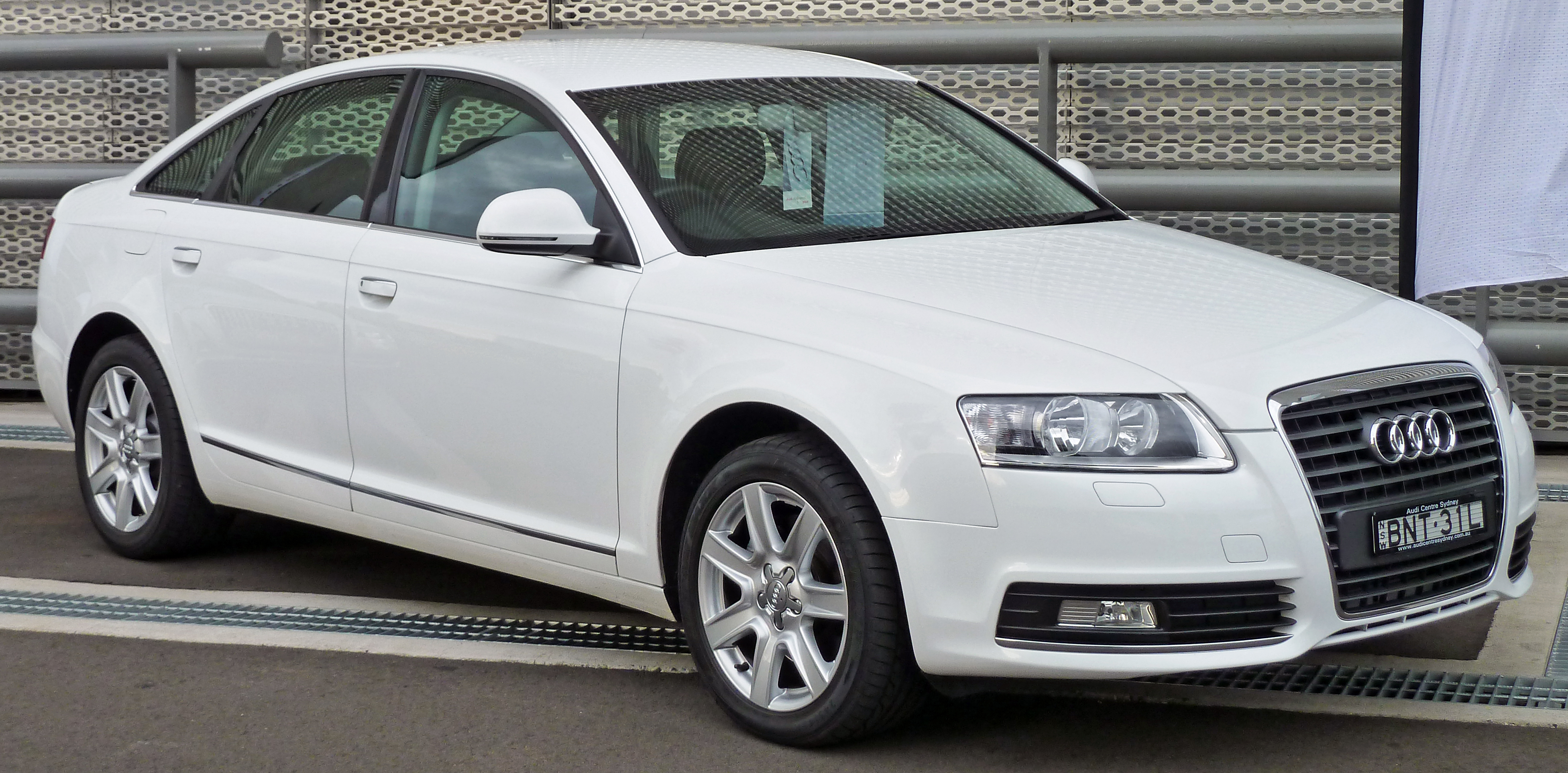

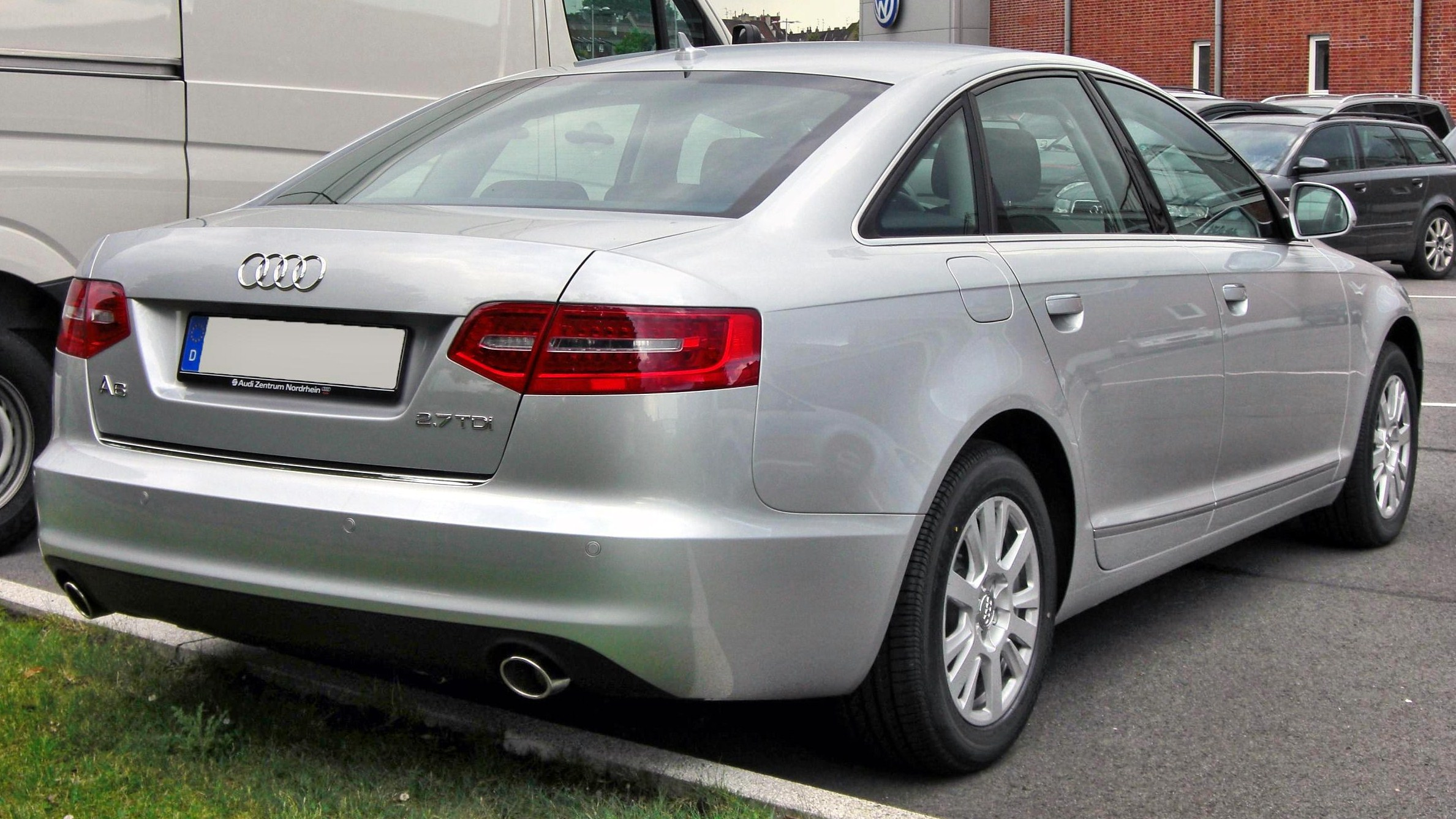
Sedan (facelift)

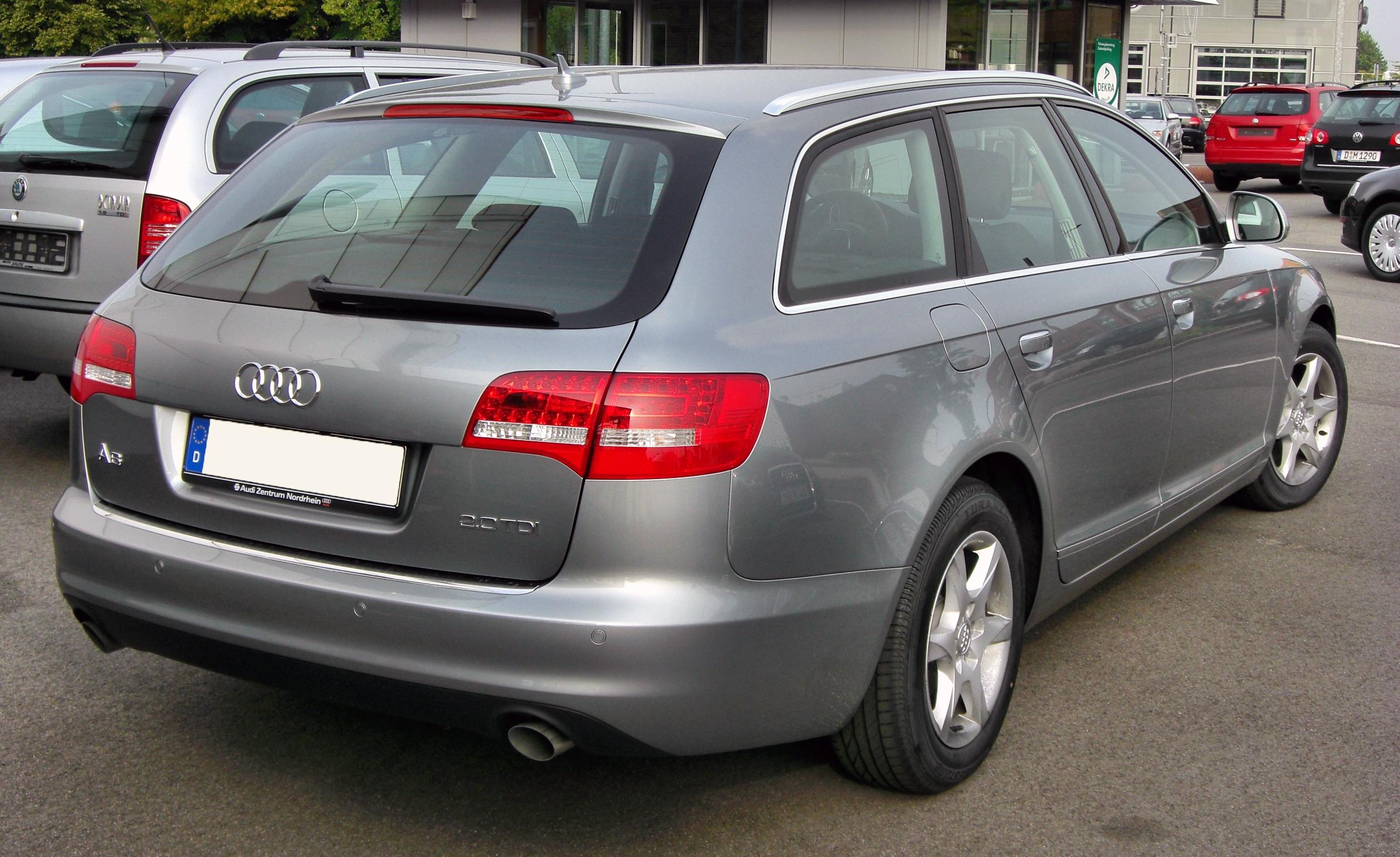
Avant (facelift)

Audi unveiled a facelifted "C6" Audi A6 on 12 August 2008, at the Moscow International Motor Show. The refresh incorporates some modern Audi design cues to keep the A6 current with the rest of the Audi lineup.

There are minor cosmetic changes to the front and rear lights which now have daytime running LEDs, the taillights extend towards the centre of the trunk lid and pinch off at the license plate mount, however, their shape remains rectangular compared to the more sculpted light clusters found in the 2008 Audi A5, 2008 Audi A4, and 2009 Audi Q5 (the latter three being all-new generations).

The intakes below the headlamps are inspired by the Audi RS5. The A6's six (per side) front light-emitting diode (LED) daytime running lights (DRLs) are located within the main headlamp housing, similar to RS6's placement of the LEDs (ten per side), whereas on the S6 these front LEDs (five per side) are found adjacent to the fog lamps in the lower front bumper.

The new front and rear fascias from RS6 would be used on the facelifted A6 and S6 lineup.

There are now six petrol and four diesel engines available for the upgraded A6. All petrol engines now feature cylinder-direct Fuel Stratified Injection (FSI) technology, and all diesel engines now feature common rail (CR) and Turbocharged Direct Injection (TDI) technologies. There is a new petrol engine, a 300 PS (221 kW; 296 bhp), 3.0-litre supercharged V6 - badged either 3.0 TFSI or 3.0T. This new engine is shared with the B8-generation Audi S4 and S5, although slightly detuned vs. the S-cars, and makes the A6 3.0T only 0.1 seconds slower 0–60 mph (97 km/h) than the more powerful but heavier 4.2 V8 variant and 5.2 V10-bearing S6.

Also updated for 2009 is the Quattro all-wheel-drive setup, which is already found on the 2008 Audi A5 and 2008 Audi A4. This new system features a 40/60 front-to-rear torque split and offers a more balanced feel, reducing the understeer that comes from 50/50 AWD platforms.

US models went on sale as 2009 model year vehicles, and arrived in dealerships by the beginning of January. Early models include A6 3.2 FSI (sedan), A6 3.0 TFSI quattro (sedan/Avant), A6 4.2 FSI quattro (sedan), S6 5.2 FSI (sedan).

=== RS6 (2008–2010) ===
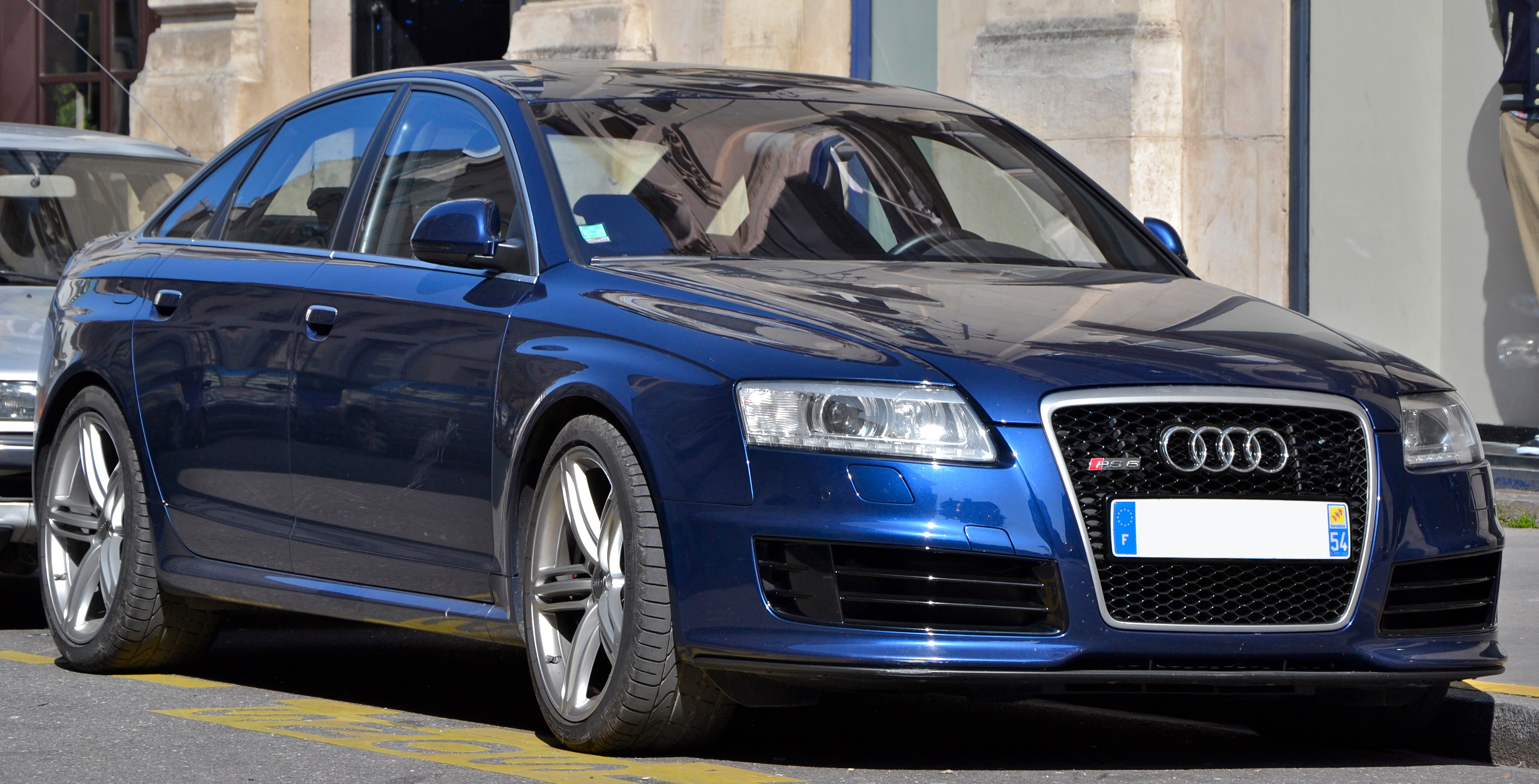
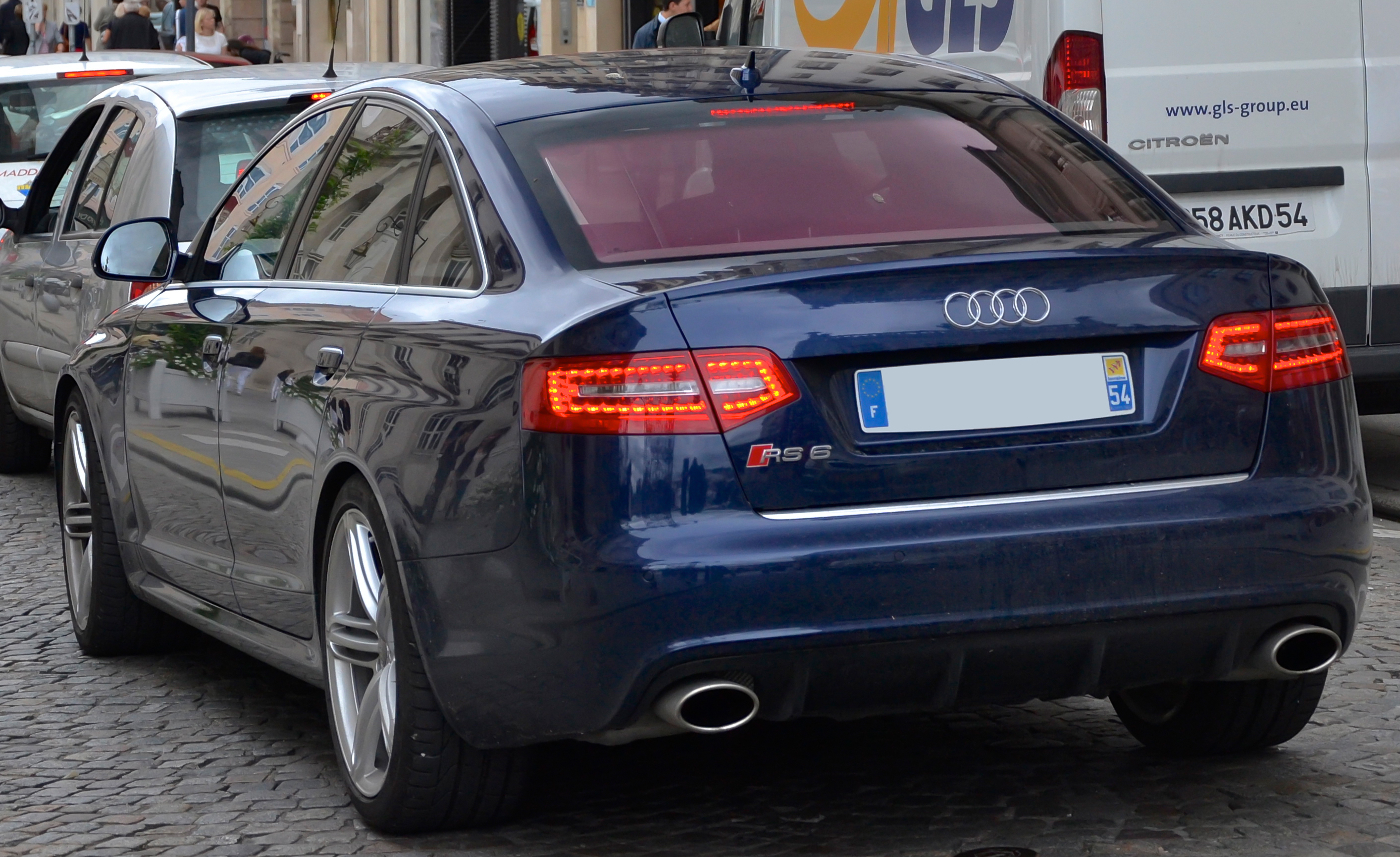
RS6 sedan

The latest version of Audi RS6 was launched in September 2008 and produced until the third quarter of 2010. Based upon the V10 engine powering the S6, the RS6 features an all-aluminium alloy 4,991 cc (304.6 cu in) V10 twin-turbocharged, Fuel Stratified Injection engine with a dry sump lubrication system. It produces a power output of 426 kW (579 PS; 571 bhp), and 650 N⋅m (479 lbf⋅ft) of torque, making it the most powerful vehicle ever produced by Audi at the time. This has now been surpassed by the Audi R8.

Initially available only as an Avant, the saloon version went on sale in mid-October 2008.

=== A6L (2009–2012) ===
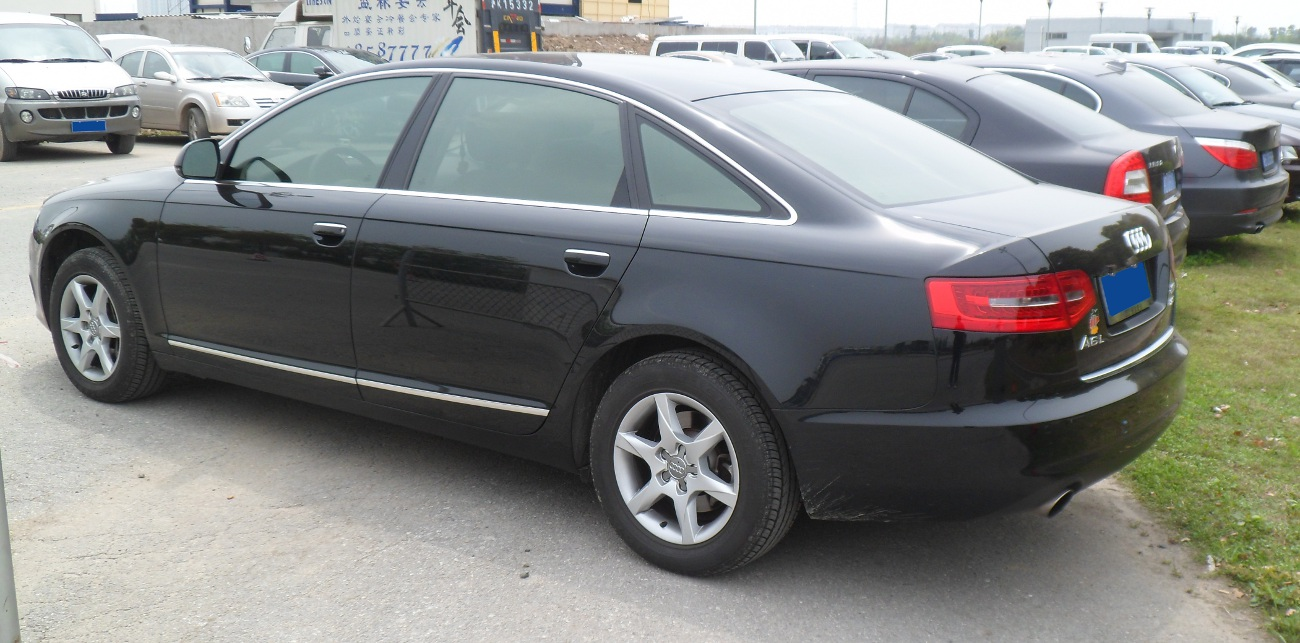
Audi A6 L (China)

The A6L is a longer wheelbase version of the A6 sedan for the Chinese market. The vehicle was unveiled at Auto Shanghai 2009. Early models included the 2.7 TDI powerplant (189 PS).

The Audi A6L was also converted into the form of a pickup truck although only two examples are known to exist on the roads.

=== C6 facelift engines ===
Model	configuration	Torque	Max. motive power
petrol engines all common rail (CR) Fuel Stratified Injection (FSI)
2.0 16v TFSI	Inline 4 DOHC turbo	280 N⋅m (207 lb⋅ft)	251 PS (185 kW; 248 hp)
2.8 24v FSI	V6 DOHC	280 N⋅m (207 lb⋅ft)	190 PS (140 kW; 187 hp); 220 PS (162 kW; 217 hp)
3.2 24v FSI	V6 DOHC	320 N⋅m (236 lb⋅ft)	240 PS (177 kW; 237 hp)
3.0 TFSI	V6 DOHC supercharged	420 N⋅m (310 lb⋅ft)	300 PS (221 kW; 296 hp)
4.2 32v FSI	V8 DOHC	440 N⋅m (325 lb⋅ft)	350 PS (257 kW; 345 hp)
diesel engines all common rail (CR) Turbocharged Direct Injection (TDI)
2.0 16v TDI	Inline 4 DOHC turbo	320 N⋅m (236 lb⋅ft)	136 PS (100 kW; 134 hp)
2.0 16v TDI	Inline 4 DOHC turbo	350 N⋅m (258 lb⋅ft)	170 PS (125 kW; 168 hp)
2.7 24v TDI	V6 DOHC turbo	400 N⋅m (295 lb⋅ft)	190 PS (140 kW; 187 hp)
3.0 24v TDI	V6 DOHC turbo	500 N⋅m (369 lb⋅ft)	239 PS (176 kW; 236 hp)

=== Safety ===
ANCAP test results* Audi A6 variant(s) as tested (2004)
Test	Score
Overall	5 /5 stars
Frontal offset	13.30/16
Side impact	16/16
Pole	2/2
Seat belt reminders	2/3
Whiplash protection	Not Assessed
Pedestrian protection	Poor
Electronic stability control	Standard

Crash testing
EuroNCAP adult occupant:	5/5 stars
EuroNCAP child occupant:	4/5 stars
EuroNCAP pedestrian:	1/4 stars
IIHS overall frontal offset crash test:	Good
IIHS side crash test:	Good
IIHS roof strength test:	Good (models built after 2013)

== C7 (Typ 4G, 2011) ==
Fourth generation (C7)
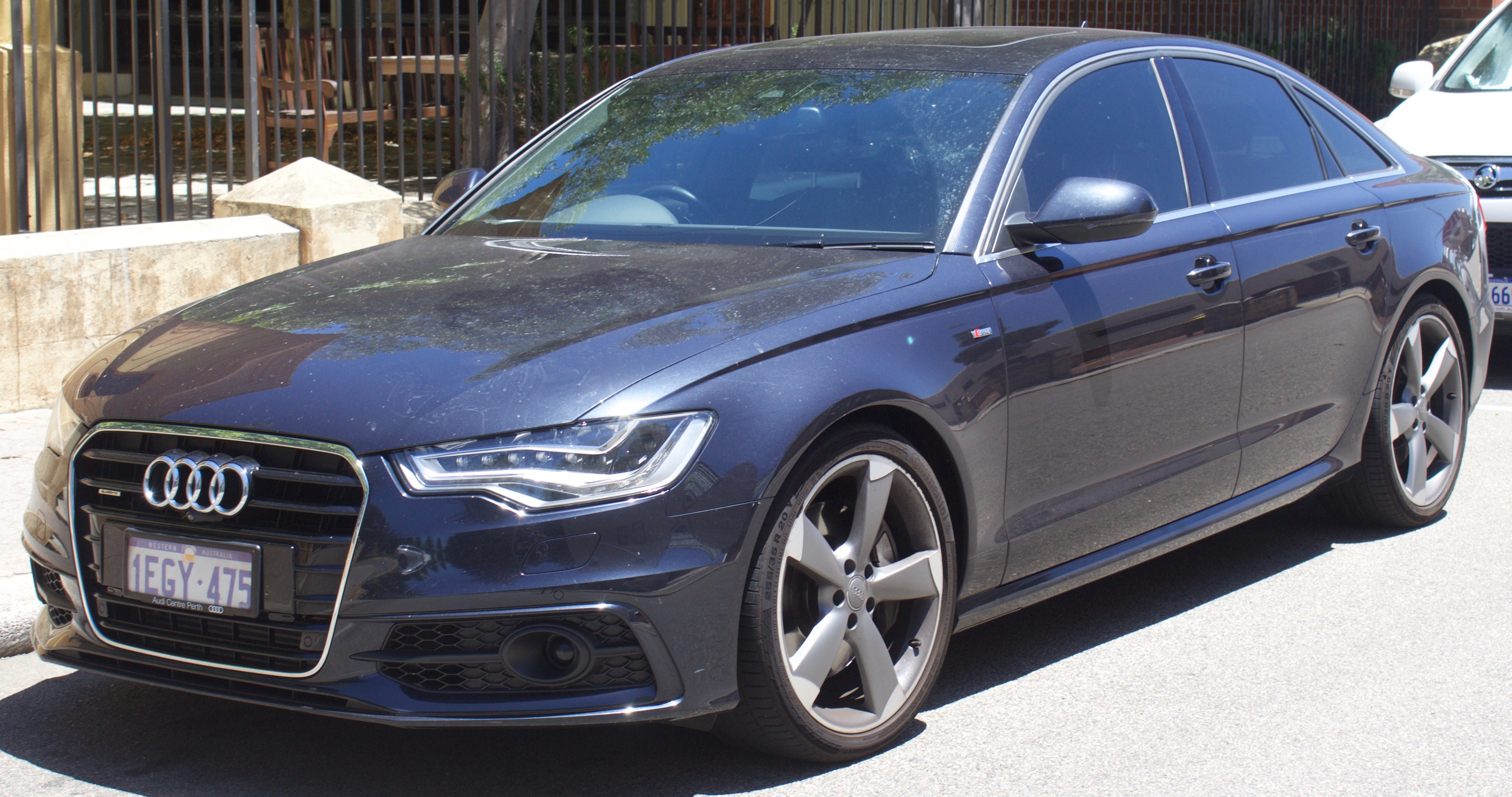

Overview
- Model code: 4G
- Production: December 2010–2018; March 2012–2018 (China)
- Model years: 2012–2018; 2013–2018 (China)
- Assembly: Germany: Neckarsulm; India: Aurangabad (Audi India); China: Changchun (FAW-VW); Indonesia: Jakarta (National Assemblers); Russia: Kaluga (Volkswagen Group Rus)
- Designer: Jürgen Löffler (2008)

Body and chassis
- Body style: 4-door sedan 5-door station wagon
- Platform: Volkswagen Group MLB platform
- Related: Audi C7 S6; Audi C7 RS6 Avant; Audi A7; Volkswagen Phideon; Hongqi H9

Powertrain
- Engine: 1.8 L TFSI I4; 2.0 L TFSI I4; 2.5 L FSI V6 (China); 2.8 L FSI V6; 3.0 L Supercharged V6; 2.0 L I4 Diesel; 3.0 L V6 Diesel
- Transmission: 6-speed manual 8-speed Tiptronic ZF 8HP automatic Multitronic CVT; 7-speed S Tronic DCT

Dimensions
- Wheelbase: 2,912 mm (114.6 in); 3,008 mm (118.4 in) (LWB)
- Length: 4,933 mm (194.2 in)
- Width: 1,874 mm (73.8 in)
- Height: 1,455 mm (57.3 in)
- Curb weight: 3,726–4,178 lb (1,690.1–1,895.1 kg)

=== Initial release ===
The fourth generation C7 series Audi A6 (internally designated Typ 4G) was leaked online in December 2010 and launched in early 2011 for the European market and in other markets soon after. It is heavily influenced by the Audi A8 (D4), pulling elements from its exterior details. The A6 shares its interior, platform, and powertrain (Modular Longitudinal Platform) with the Audi A7 four door sedan, which had been released shortly before also in 2011. Design work began in 2006, with Jurgen Loffler's exterior design being chosen in 2008.

The new A6 increased its wheelbase by nearly 3 in (76 mm) and its width by 2.7 in (69 mm). The redesign also decreased the car's drag coefficient to 0.25.

European engine choices for the C7 include two petrol engines – a 2.8-litre FSI V6 with 204 hp (152 kW) and a 300 hp (224 kW), 3.0-litre supercharged FSI engine – and two diesel engines – a 2.0-litre inline four-cylinder and a 3.0-litre turbocharged diesel engine in three states of tune. The European A6 3.0 TFSI will have an optional seven-speed dual-clutch transmission and an air suspension option, two features that will not be available on the United States model.

For North America, the Audi A6 3.0 TFSI quattro came with a 3.0-litre supercharged V6 putting out 310 PS (228 kW; 306 hp) and 325 lb⋅ft (441 N⋅m), the same engine carried over from the previous-generation A6 3.0 TFSI, but in a higher state of tune and mated to an eight-speed automatic transmission. There is also an Audi A6 2.0 TFSI quattro powered by a 2.0-litre turbocharged inline-four, the same engine in the Audi A4 and Q5, mated to an eight-speed automatic transmission. For the United States but not the Canadian market, there will be an entry-level Audi A6 2.0 TFSI FrontTrak (front-wheel drive) with a 2.0-litre turbocharged inline-four, the same engine in the Audi A4 and Q5, but mated to the Multitronic CVT (continuous variable transmission).

The 2012 model year A6 features all the driver assistance systems from the A8, plus it adds automotive head-up display, active lane assist. Full LED headlamps with Automatic high beam switching or Audi adaptive light (Xenon) with variable headlight range control.

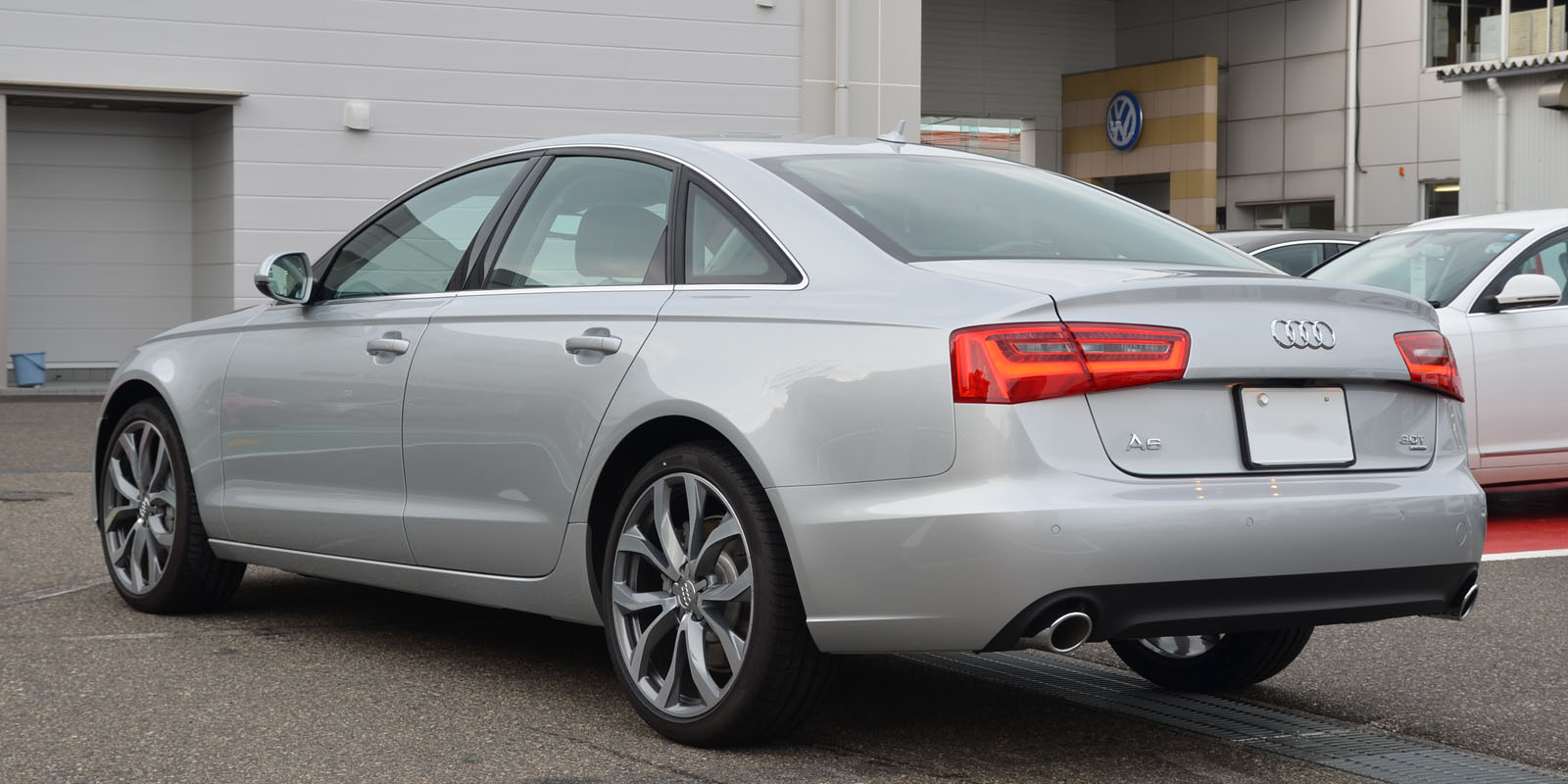
Audi A6 3.0 TFSI quattro (Japan; pre-facelift)

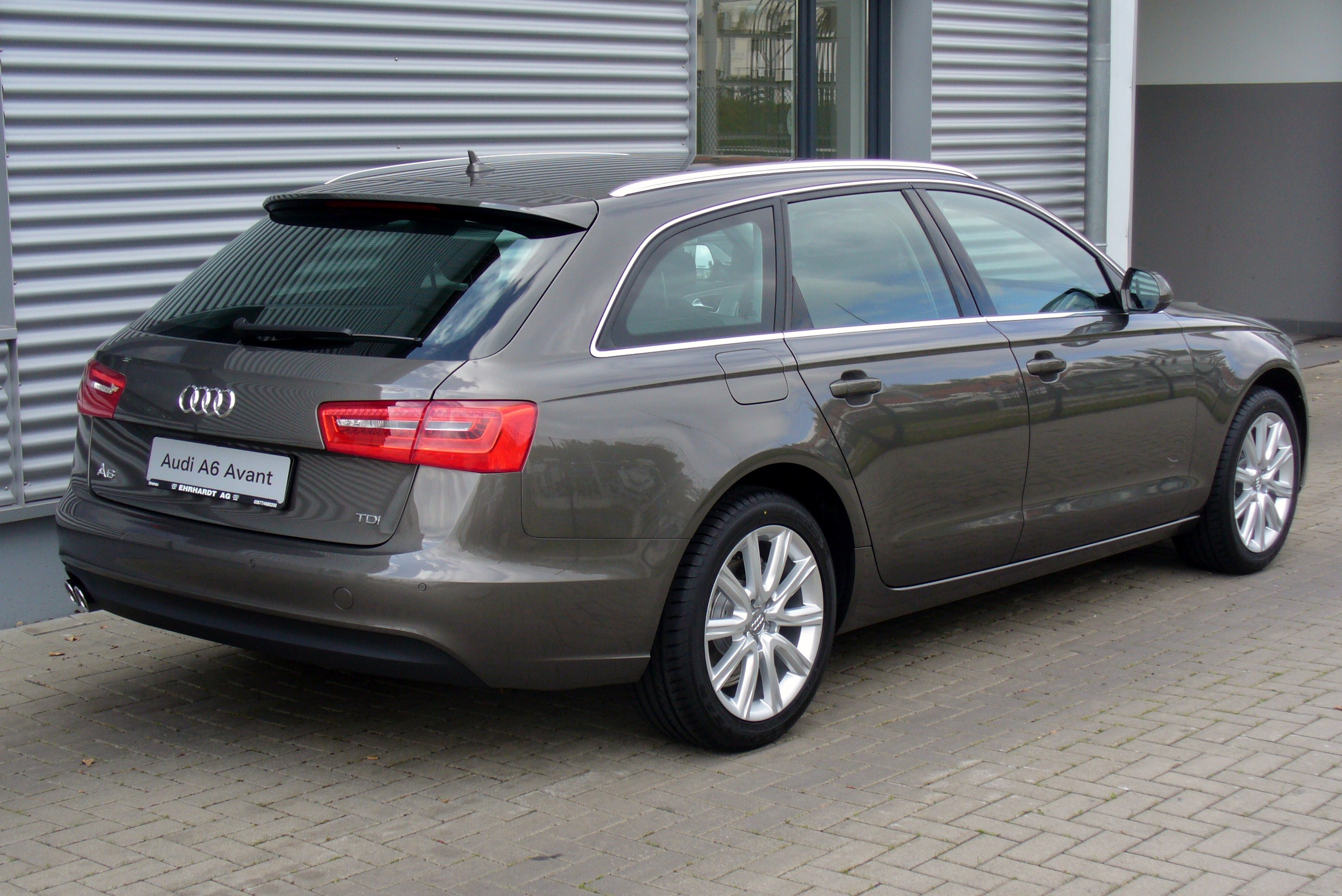
Audi A6 2.0 TDI Avant (Europe; pre-facelift)

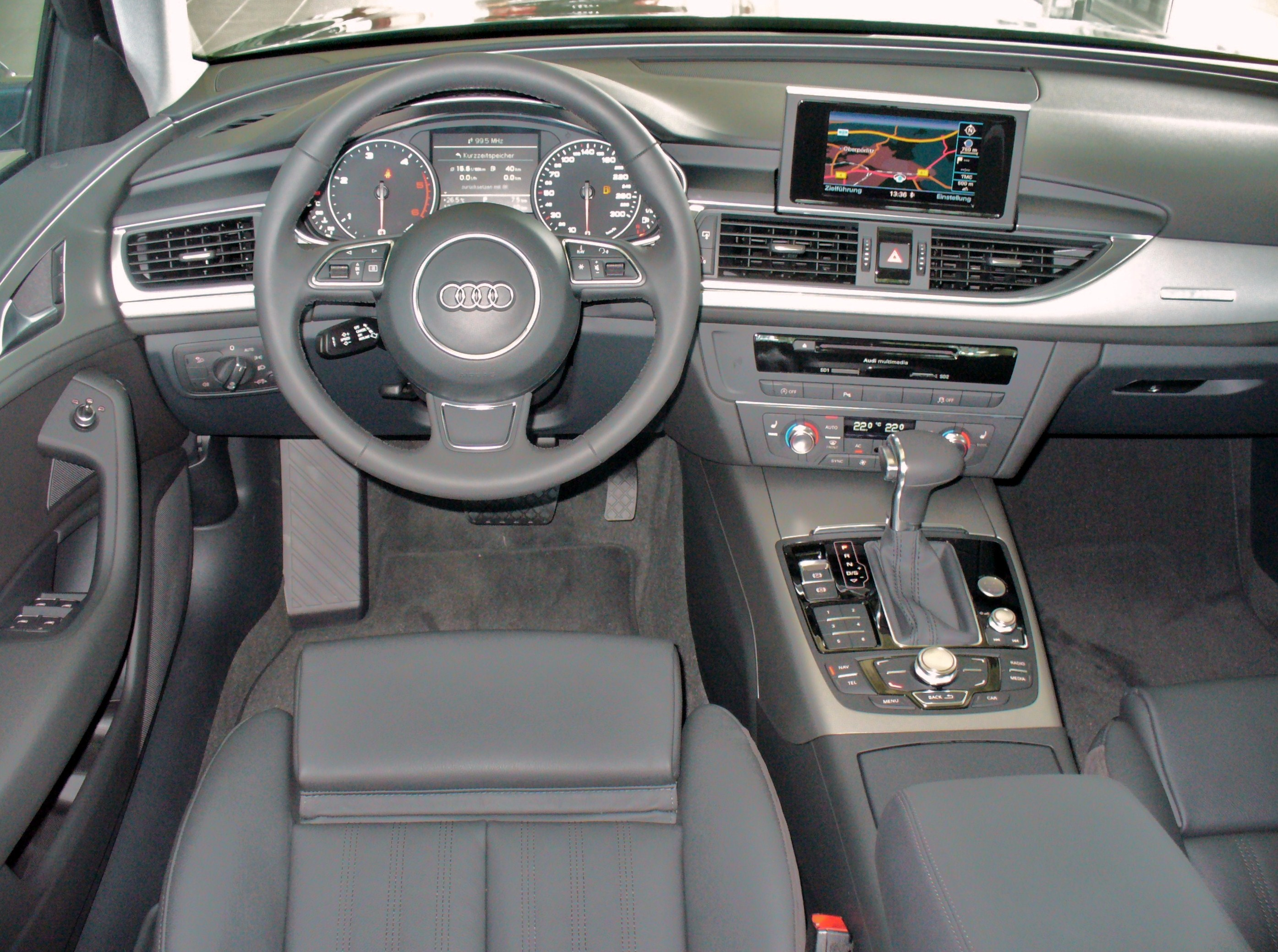
Interior

=== C7 facelift (2015–2018) ===
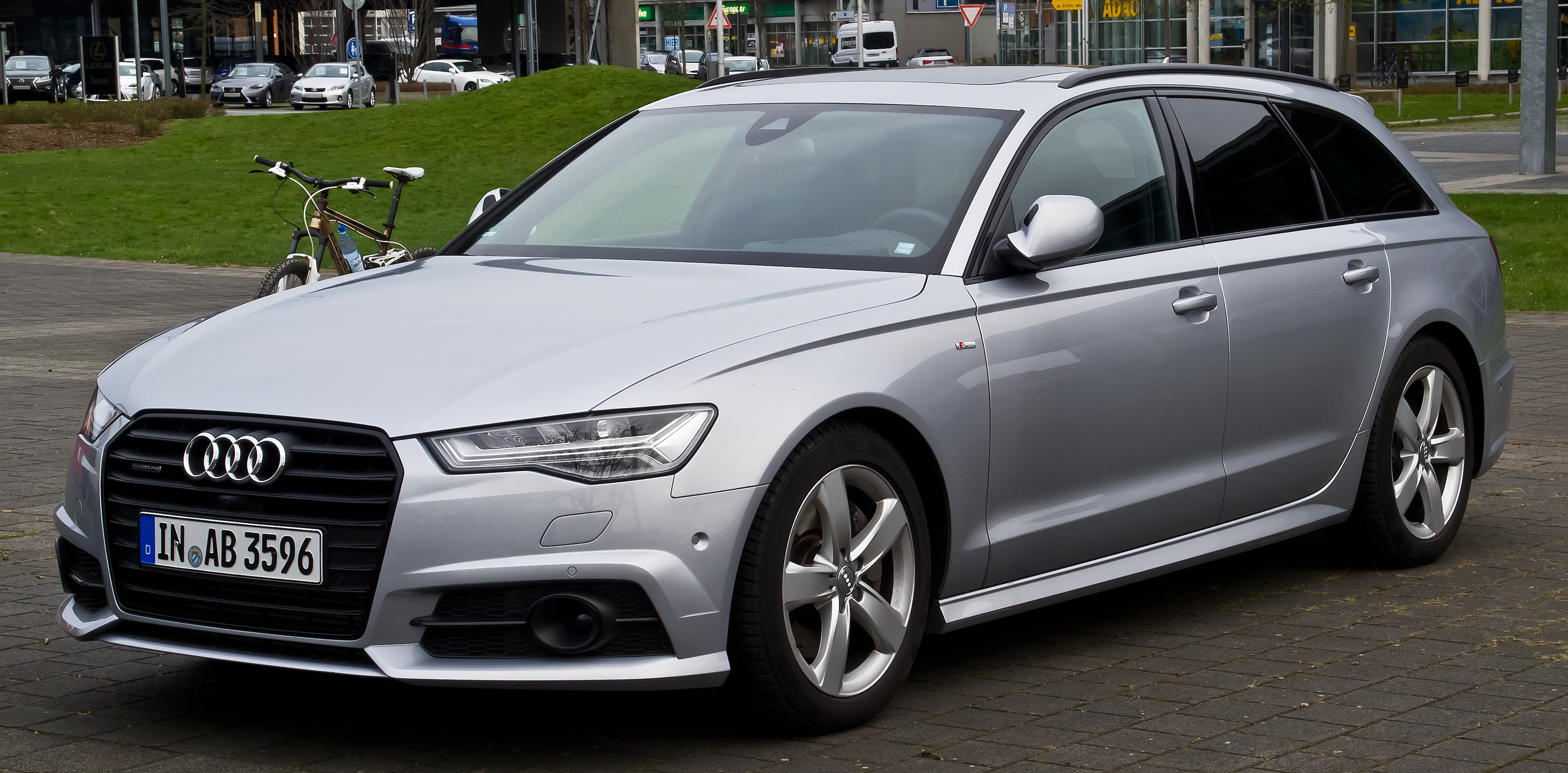
2015 Audi A6 avant S-line

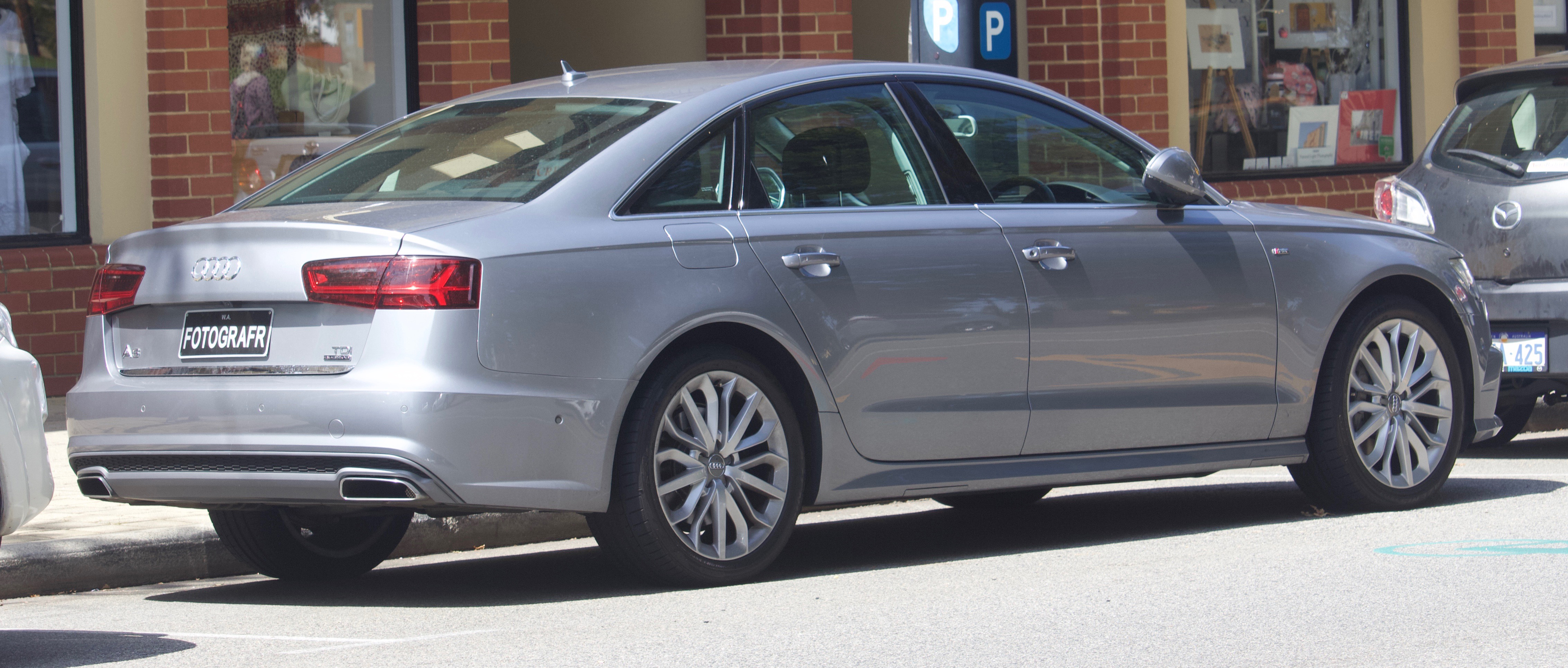
2015 Audi A6 sedan

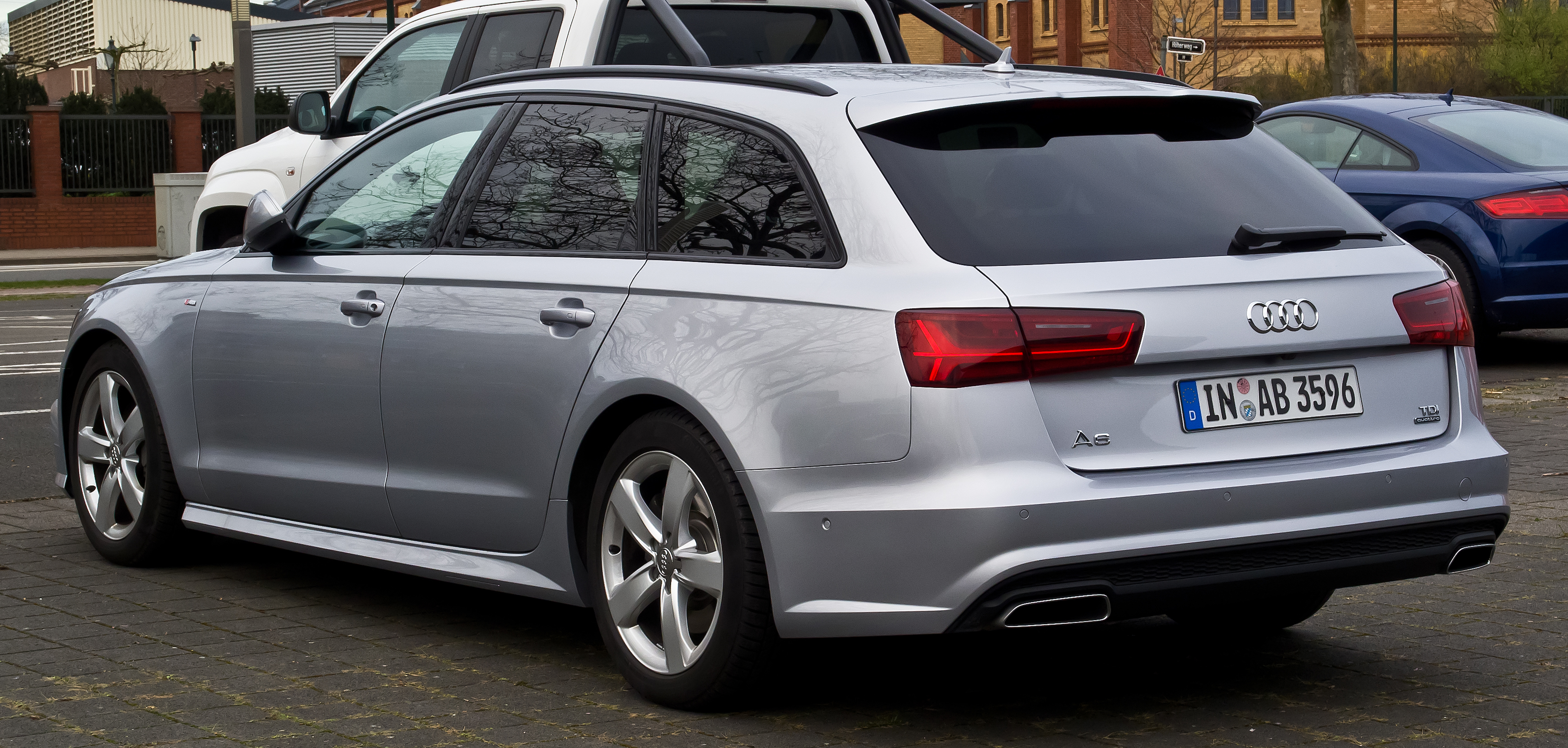
2015 Audi A6 avant

Audi unveiled the 2015 C7 mid-life facelift at the 2014 Paris Motor Show. The refresh includes styling tweaks to the car's exterior, engine line-up, transmission and MMI infotainment system with faster Tegra 3 processor, Handwriting recognition, Audi connect Telematics with 4G mobile internet (and online updates for the navigation map), and advanced Matrix LED headlights.

All three TFSI 1.8tfsi and five TDI engines now meet the Euro 6 emission standard. The new TDI Ultra model now comes with glass fibre-reinforced polymer (GFRP) springs and both ultra models now come with S-Tronic (dual-clutch) transmission. The entry-level Audi A6 2.0 TFSI FrontTrak (front-wheel drive) with a 2.0-litre turbocharged inline-four, received a seven-speed dual-clutch automatic that replaced the previous Multitronic CVT (continuously variable transmission).

=== A6 hybrid (2012–2014) ===
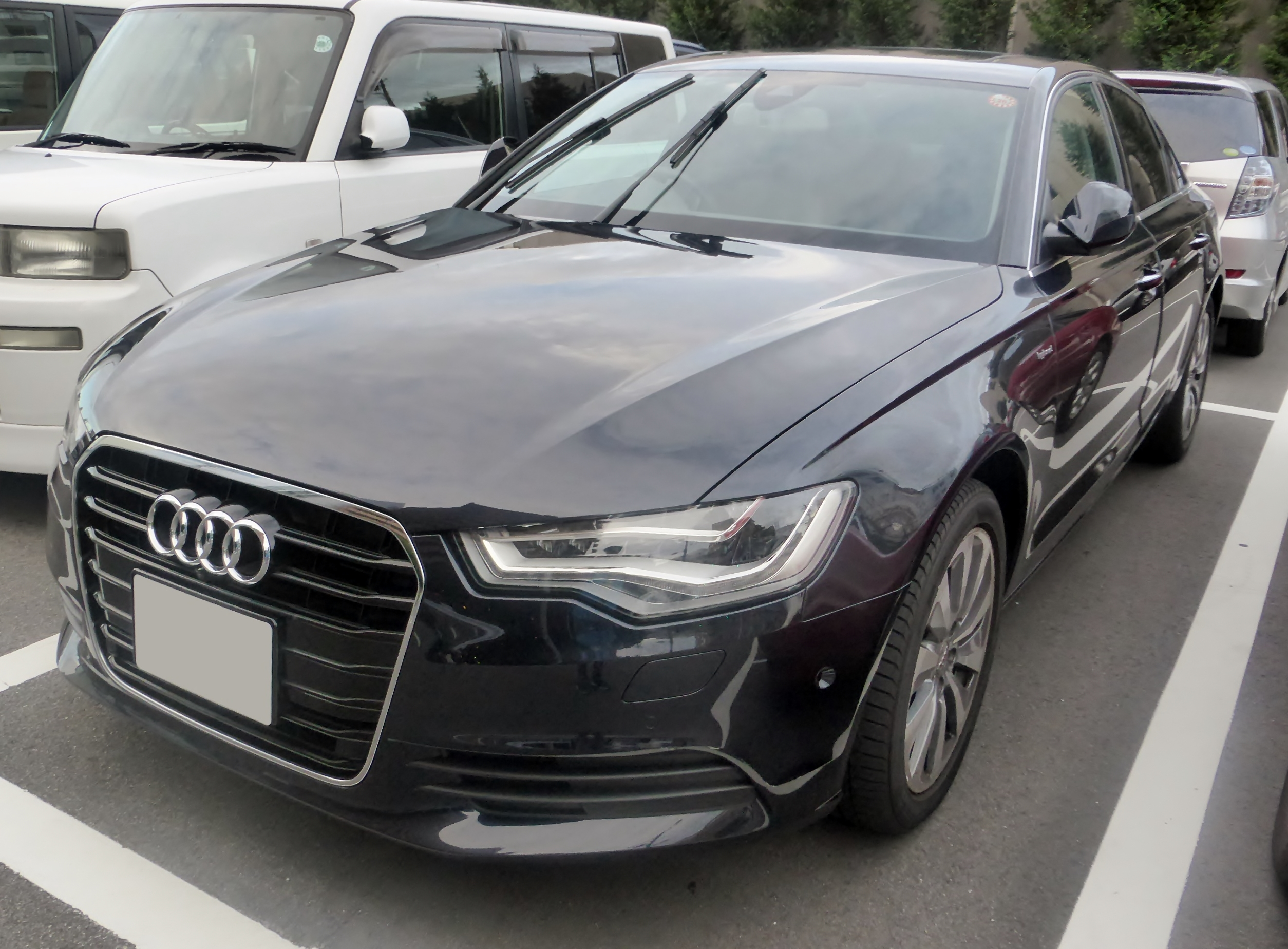
A6 Hybrid

A hybrid electric variant was also available for the first time in the A6, offering a 2-litre TFSI 211 PS (155 kW) engine combined with a 45 PS (33 kW) electric motor. Electric power is supplied via a 1.3 kWh lithium-ion battery, with electric-only range of 3 km for constant 60 km/h (37.28 mph) drive and a top speed of 100 km/h (62.14 mph).

The market launch of the A6 Hybrid was scheduled for 2012. However, production of the US model was delayed.

The Audi A6 hybrid was discontinued due to low sales in 2014 after roughly 4,000 units sold.

=== A6 allroad quattro (2012–2018) ===
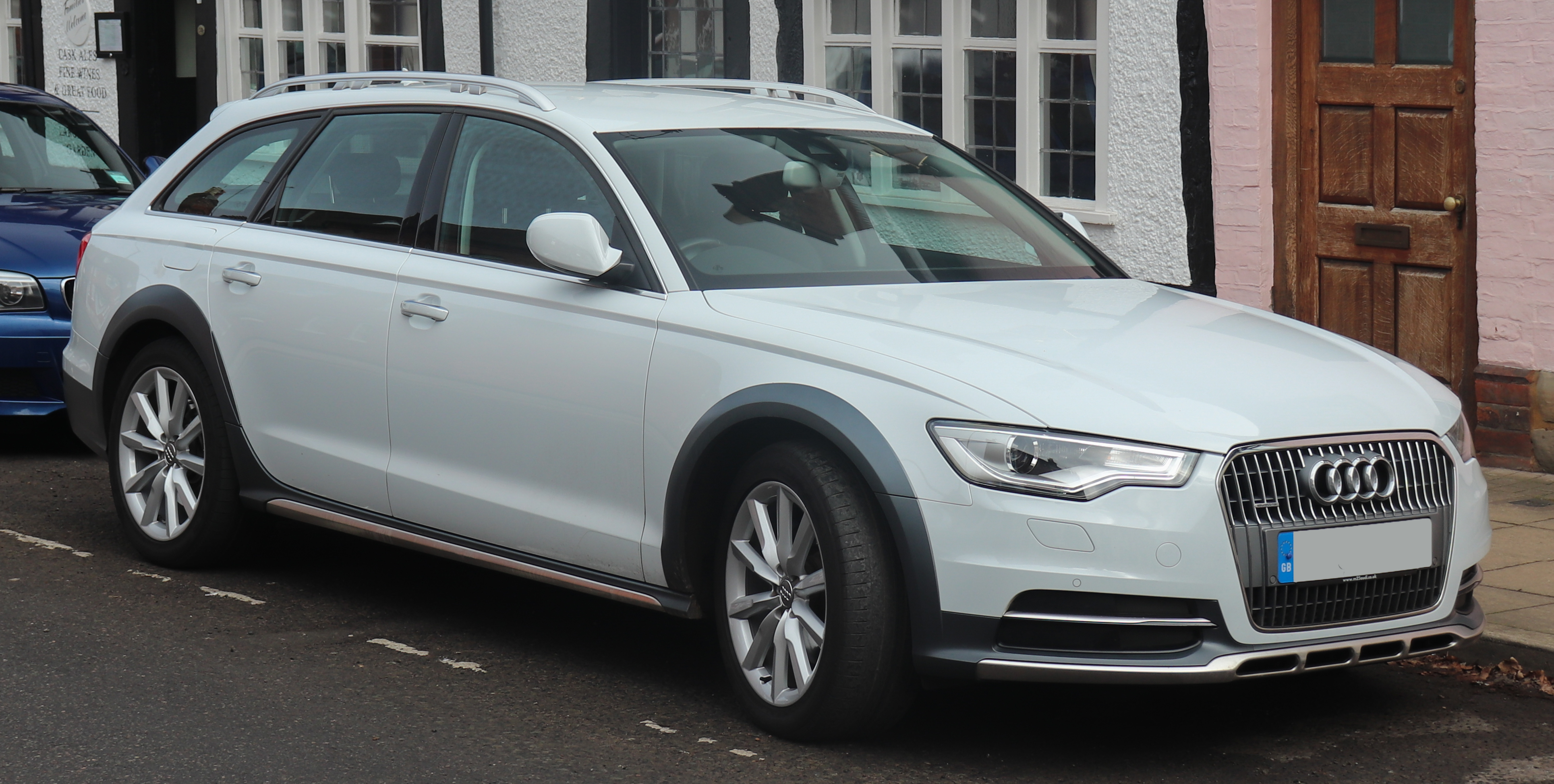

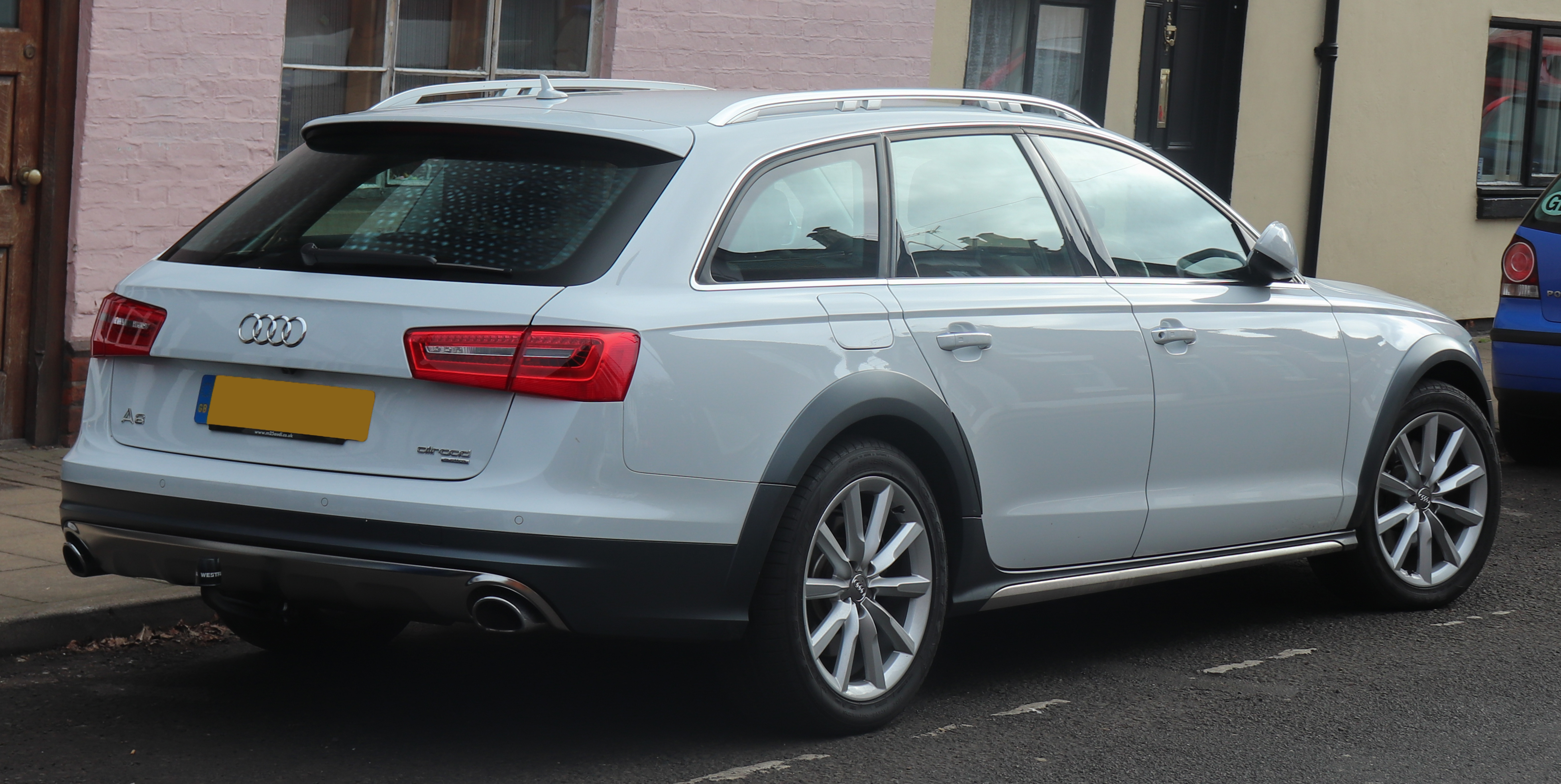
A6 allroad quattro

The 2013 A6 allroad Quattro was unveiled at the 2012 Geneva Motor Show, alongside the 2012 RS4 Avant. Sales began in 2012. The first UK deliveries arrived in July 2012.

The allroad variant contains several unique features. Audi designed more than 1,100 new, unique parts for the allroad, setting it apart from the standard A6 and making it a true all-terrain vehicle. Most obvious, the allroad received special bumpers and fender flares, giving it an aggressive offroad appearance. The bumpers and fender flares feature a tough-wearing, matte finish, contrasting the rest of the body. The roof received this same coating, as well as four longitudinal ribs for increased strength. The unique bumpers also have integrated aluminium skid plates. The allroad featured larger diameter tires than the standard A6 for improved offroad capabilities. Redesigned headlights, larger side mirrors, and a lack of door "rub strips" are unique to the allroad.

The allroad comes standard with an adjustable air suspension system can lift the car high enough to provide 208 mm (8 in) of ground clearance; a low-range mode (an option with manual transmission), absent from other quattro-equipped vehicles, can be selected with the touch of a button. When used together, the two systems made it possible for the allroad to complete an official Land Rover test-course, thus far it is the only car-based SUV that has been proven capable of doing so in testing.

Conversely, the air suspension can lower the vehicle down to only 142 mm (6 in) above road level, and simultaneously stiffen the spring and damper rates to provide a sporty driving experience, much like that of the conventional A6 with the sports suspension.

It went on sale in early 2012. Early variants included 3.0 TFSI quattro (310 PS), 3.0 TDI quattro (204 PS), 3.0 TDI quattro (245 PS), 3.0 TDI quattro (313 PS).

=== A6 L (2012–2018) ===
The A6 L (built in China for the Chinese market as a long wheelbase alternative to the standard A6) was unveiled in 2012 in Guangzhou International Sports Arena. Early models include A6 L TFSI, A6 L 30 FSI, A6 L 35 FSI, A6 L 35 FSI quattro, A6 L 50 TFSI quattro.

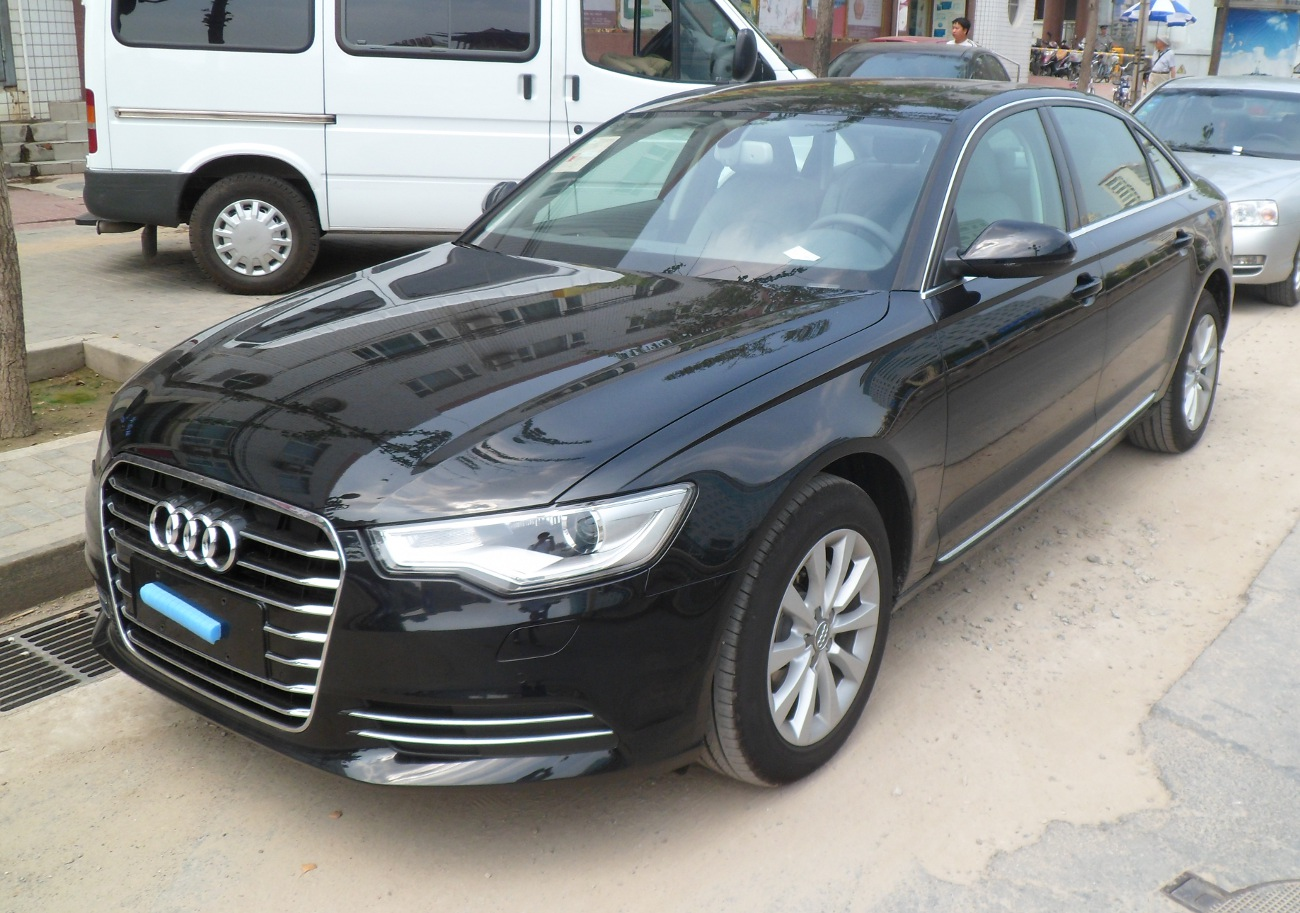
Audi A6 L (China) Front

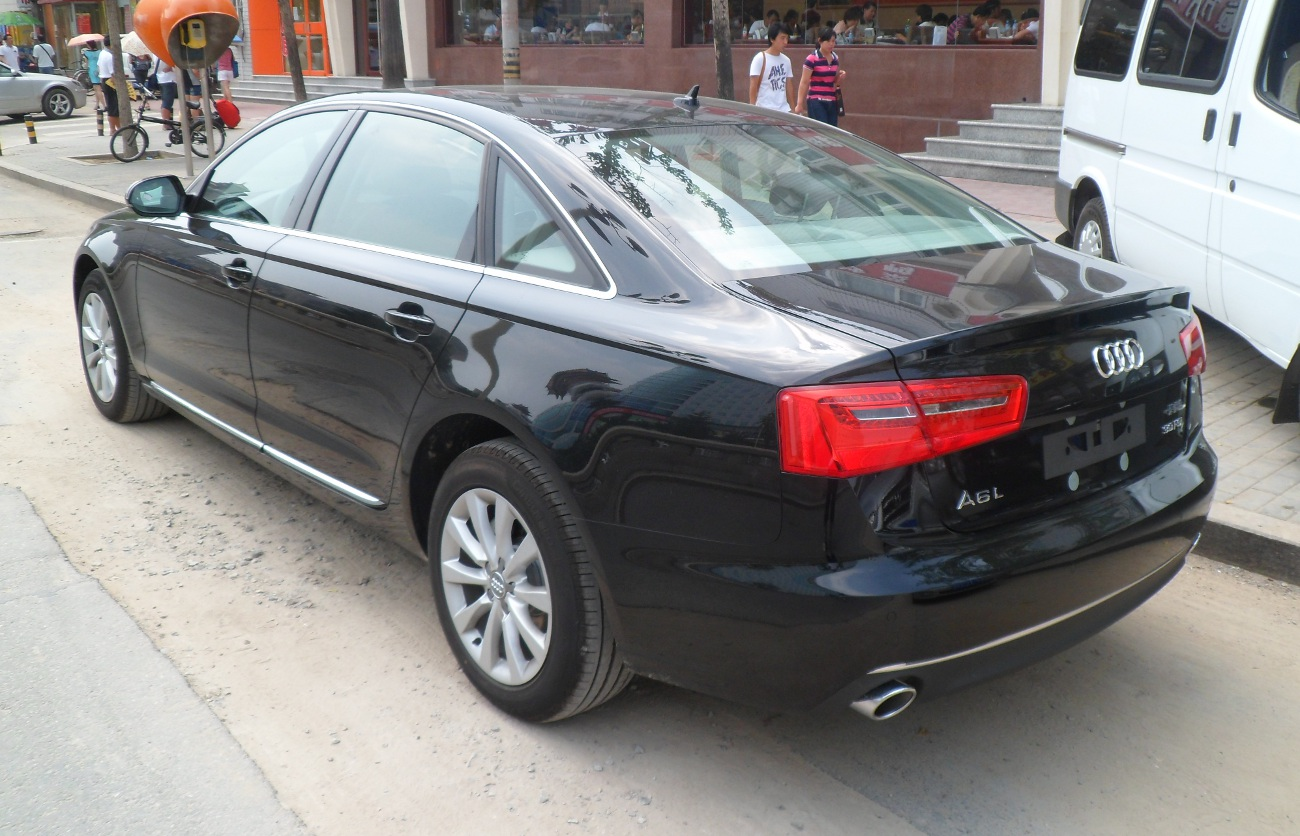
Audi A6 L (China) Rear

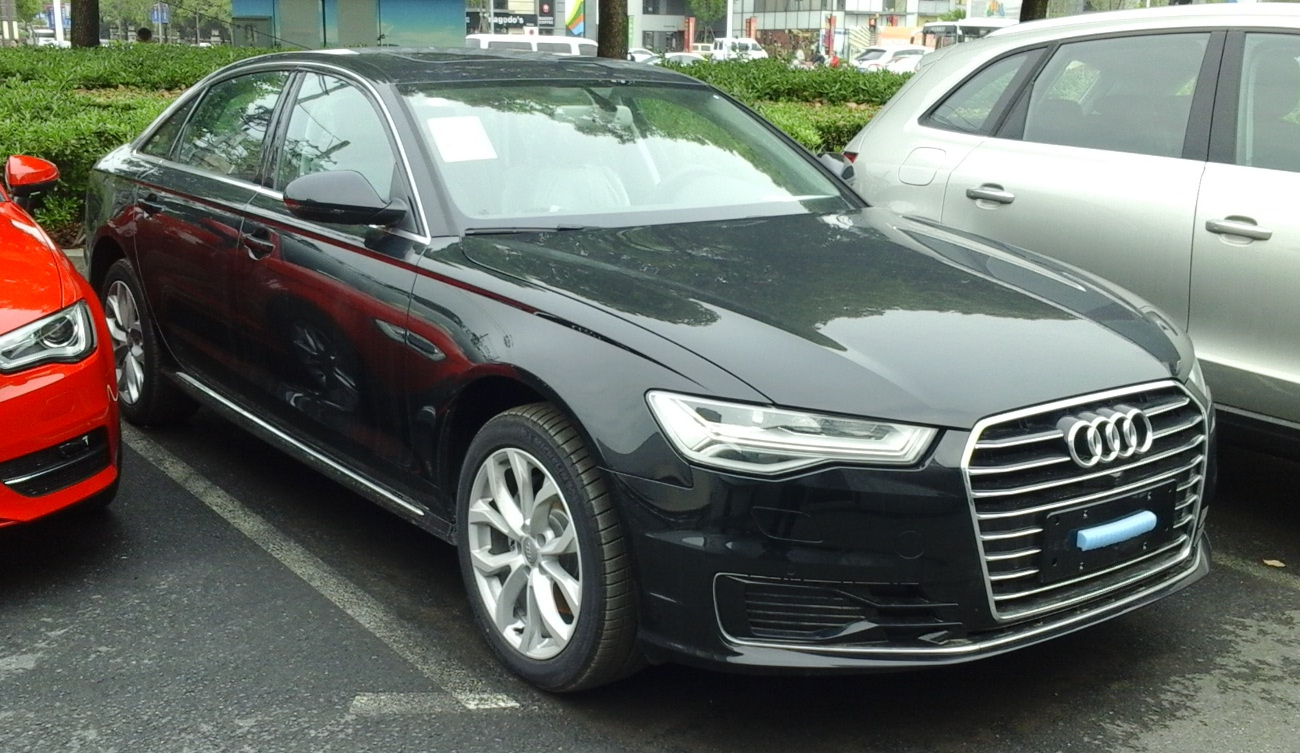
Audi A6 L Facelift (China)

=== S6 (2012–2018) ===
Available as the S6 saloon and S6 Avant, they included twin-turbo V8 engine rated 420 PS (309 kW; 414 hp) at 5500–6400 rpm and 550 N⋅m (406 lbf⋅ft) at 1450–5250 rpm, recuperation and start-stop systems, cylinder deactivation, Active Noise Cancellation system, seven-speed S tronic transmission, quattro permanent all-wheel drive system with a self-locking centre differential and torque vectoring (optional sport differential), adaptive air suspension lowers the body by 10 mm (0.4 in), internally ventilated brake discs (optional carbon fibre-ceramic discs), matte black calipers with S6 logos, 8.5Jx19-inch cast aluminium wheels in a unique five parallel-spoke design (optional seven different 19- or 20-inch wheels (four from quattro GmbH), including 20-inch titanium-look wheels with a five-arm rotor design), 255/40-series tires, Audi drive select driving dynamics system, optional dynamic steering, single-frame grille with aluminium applications and chromed horizontal double bars, exterior mirrors feature aluminium-look housings, S6 sedan with spoiler on the trunk (S6 Avant has a roof spoiler), diffuser on the rear bumper in platinum gray with an aluminium-look offset edge, four elliptical chrome-tipped tailpipes, choice of eight body colours (including exclusive shades Estoril Blue, crystal effect and Prism Silver, crystal effect), body decorated with S6 and V8T badges, leather sport steering wheel with coloured stitching, footrest and pedals and soft keys of the MMI operating system in an aluminium-look finish, decorative inlays in matt brushed aluminium (optional carbon, fine grain ash natural brown, layered Beaufort oak), choice of 3 colours for headlining, instrument panel, carpet and seats (black, lunar silver and goa beige (only for the seat upholstery)); Pearl Nappa leather and Alcantara seat upholstery (optional Milano and Valcona leather), height-adjustable sport seats with power lumbar supports and embossed S logos (optional power-adjustable comfort seats with memory function, power-adjustable S sport seats with integrated head restraints).

Other options include xenon plus headlights with an all-weather light, LED rear lights, an electromechanical parking brake, driver information system with colour display, MMI radio plus includes a Bluetooth interface, Audi sound system with ten speakers, MMI navigation plus (hard drive, an eight-inch monitor, MMI touch input system), 15-speaker Bang & Olufsen Advanced Sound System.

The S6 sedan was unveiled at the 2011 Frankfurt Motor Show.

S6 sedan and Avant models went on sale in early 2012.

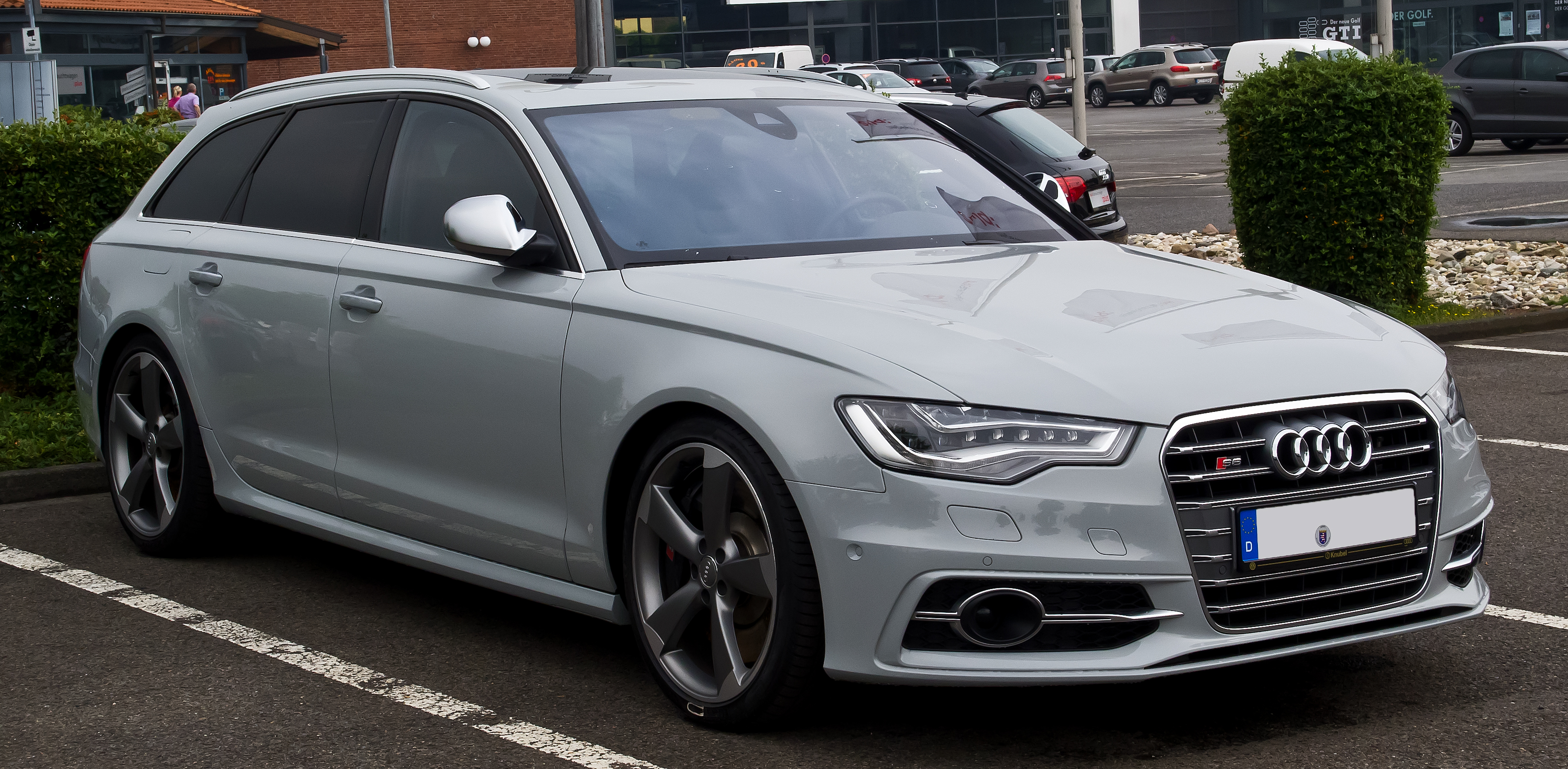
2014 Avant (S6)

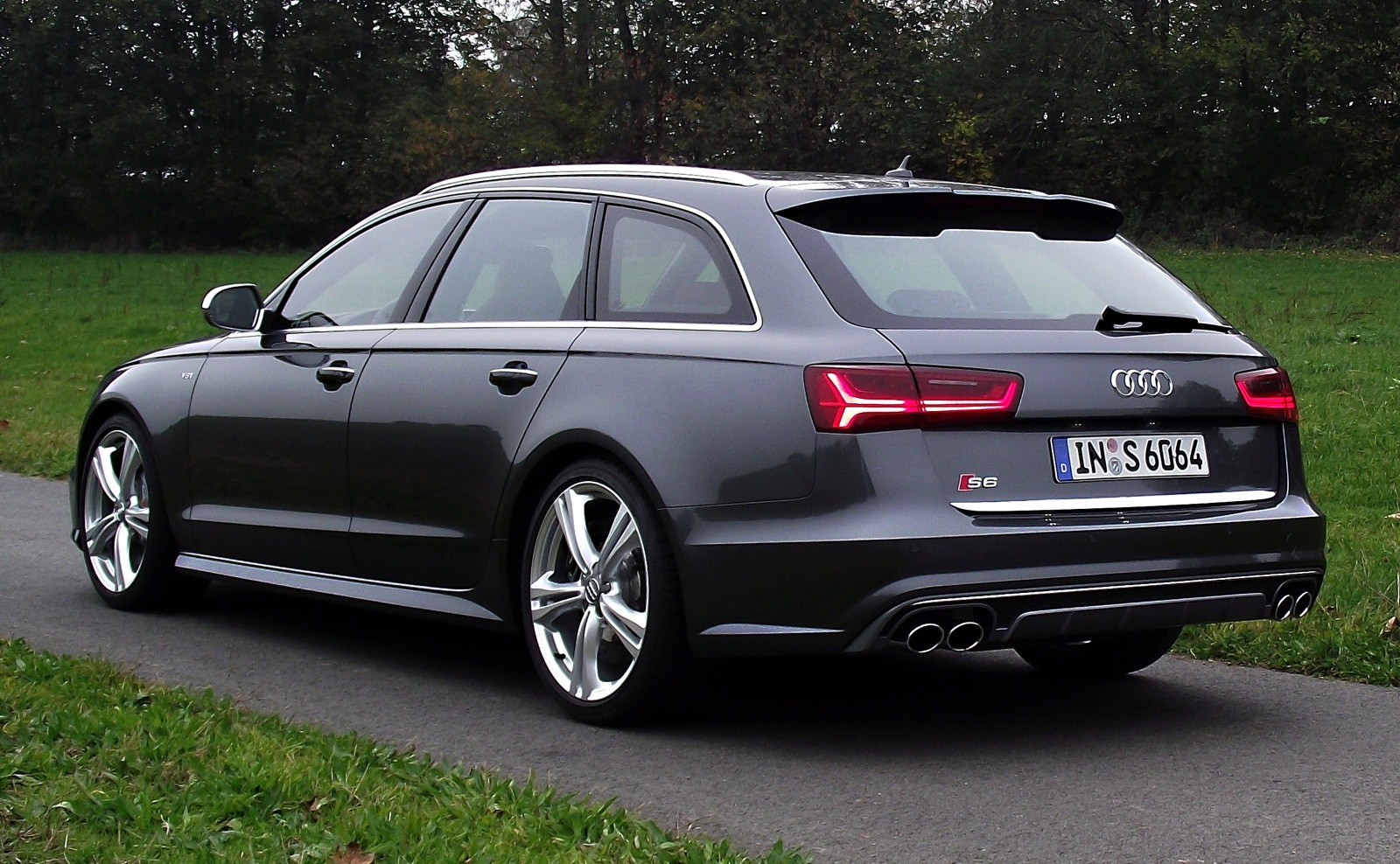
2015 Avant (S6)

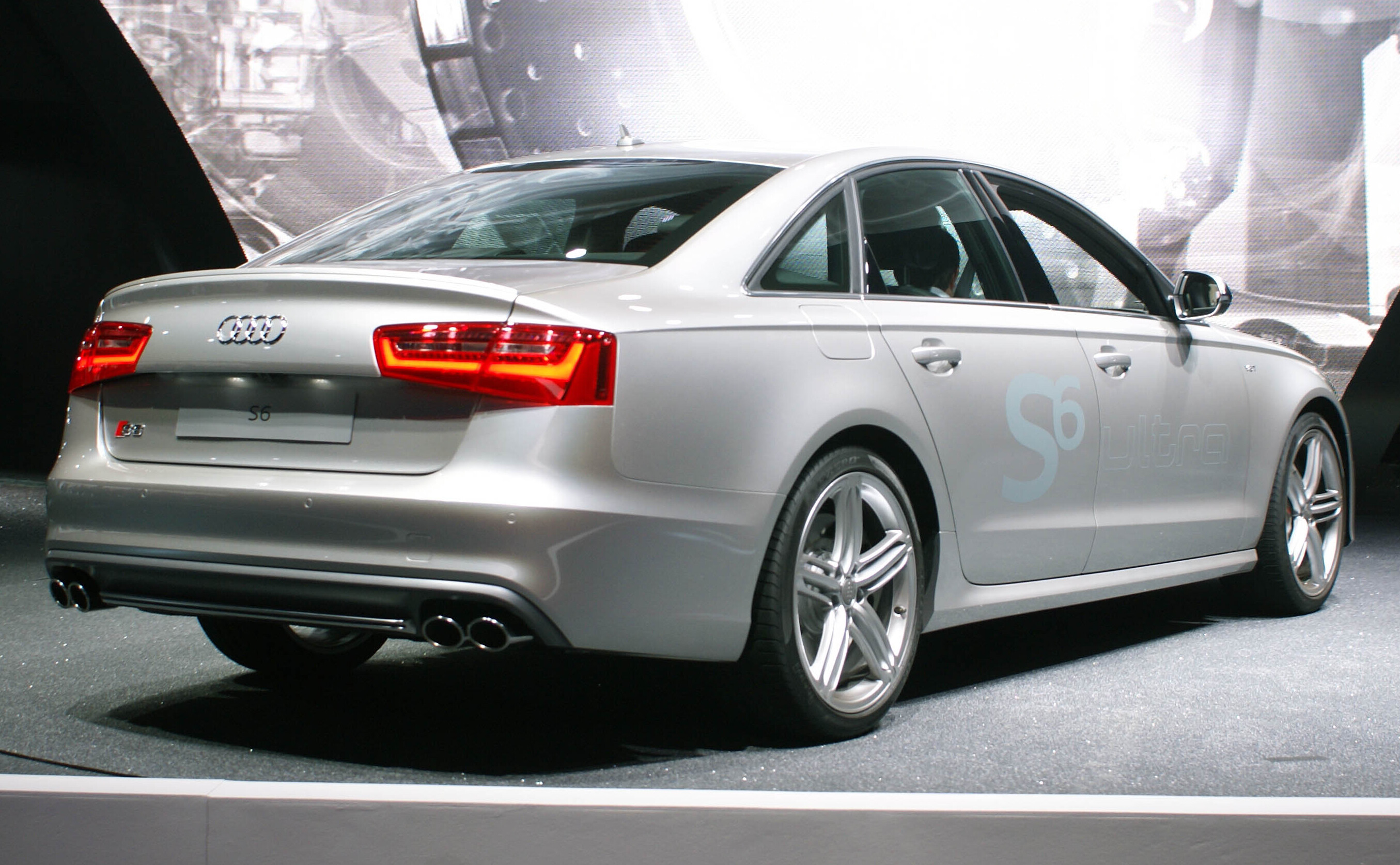
2014 sedan (S6)

=== A6L e-tron ===
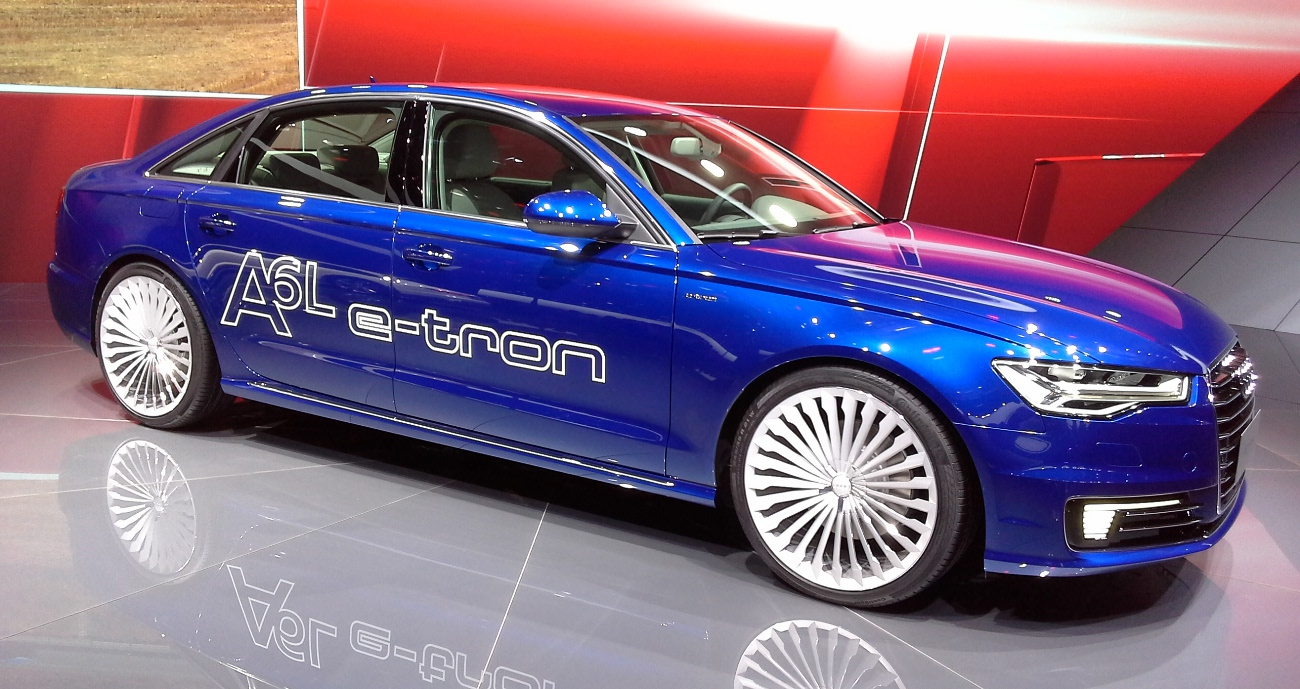
Audi A6L e-tron at Auto Shanghai 2015

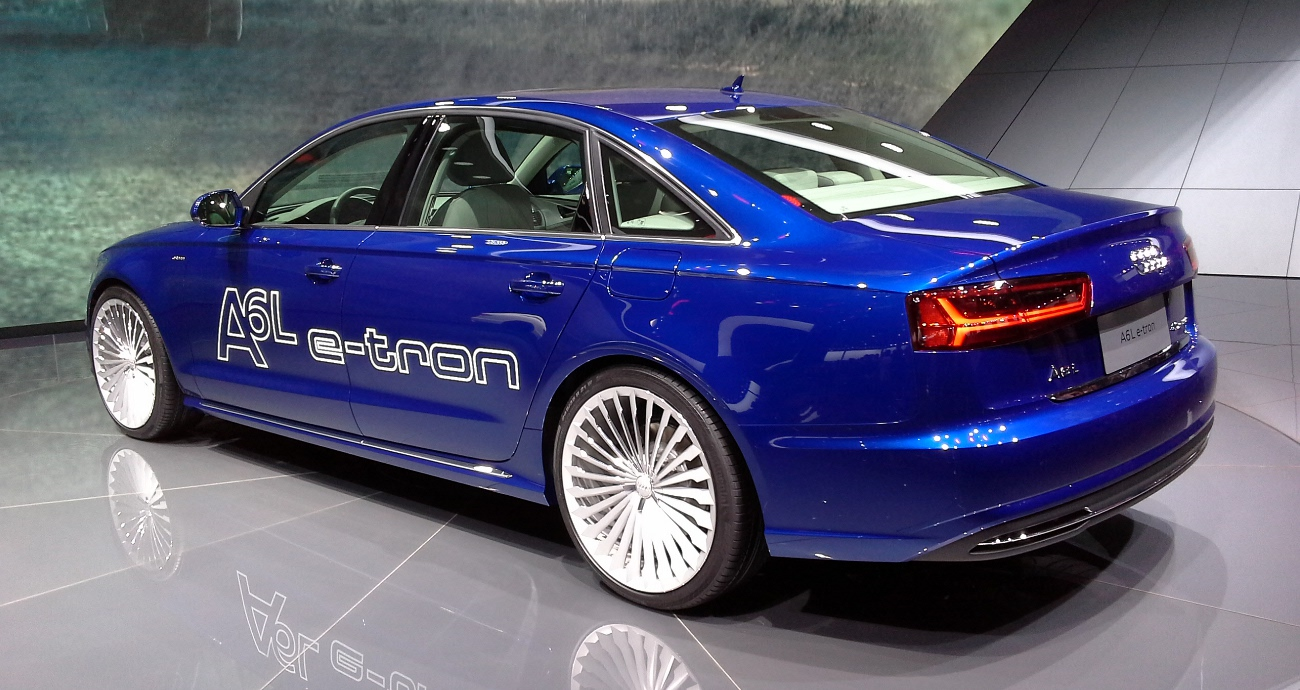
Audi A6L e-tron at Auto Shanghai 2015

The concept vehicle was unveiled in Auto China 2012 in Beijing.

It is a plug-in hybrid version of A6 L with 2.0 TFSI 211 PS (155 kW; 208 hp) engine combined with a 95 PS (70 kW; 94 hp) electric motor. Electric power is supplied via a 14.1 kWh lithium-ion battery, with all-electric range of 80 km (49.71 mi) for constant 60 km/h (37.28 mph) drive. Other features include MMI navigation plus developed in Audi Infotainment Tech Center (ITC) in Beijing.

The series production plug-in hybrid car will be available in China in 2016 on the long-wheelbase version, using the same hybrid vehicle powertrain like the concept vehicle. It has a power output of 180 kW (241 hp), with 500 N⋅m (369 lb⋅ft) of torque. All-electric range will be 50 km (31.1 mi). Acceleration from 0–60 mph (97 km/h) takes 8.4 seconds. Fuel consumption will be 2.2 L/100 km (106.9 mpg_{‑US}).

=== A6 Black Edition (2013–) ===
Available in Saloon and Avant bodies, the Black Edition is a version of the A6 S line with 177 PS 2.0-litre TDI or higher engines (excluding S6) in front-wheel-drive or Quattro all-wheel-drive configurations, for the UK market. It included 20-inch rotor-design alloy wheels with a dark titanium finish, black grille, number plate surrounds and window frame strips, and privacy glass extending from the B-pillar rearwards; black roof rails, Piano Black inlays, sports seats upholstered in black Valcona leather, black headlining, BOSE audio system with DAB radio, Audi Music Interface (AMI) for iPod connection.

Sales began in November 2012, with deliveries beginning in early 2013.

=== RS6 Avant (2013–2018) ===
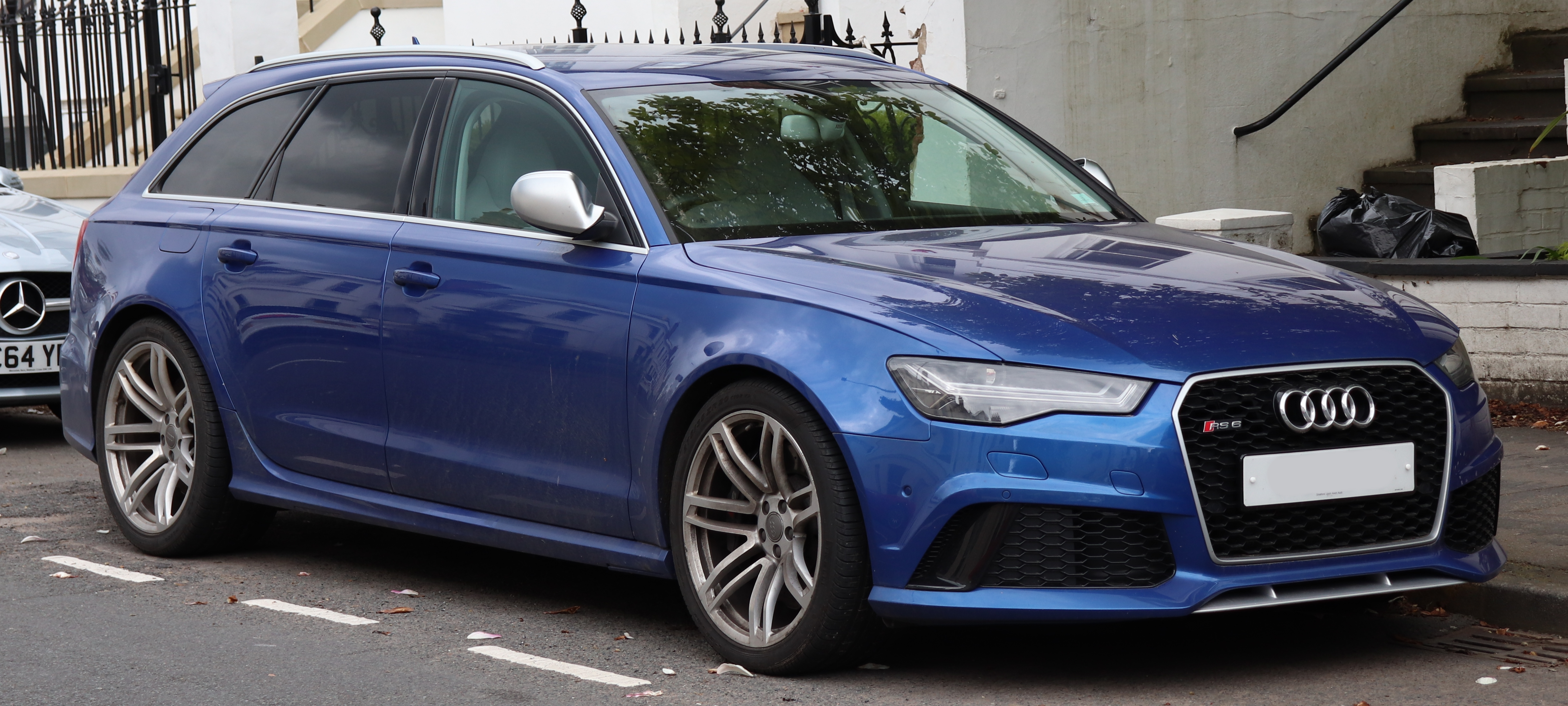
RS6 Avant

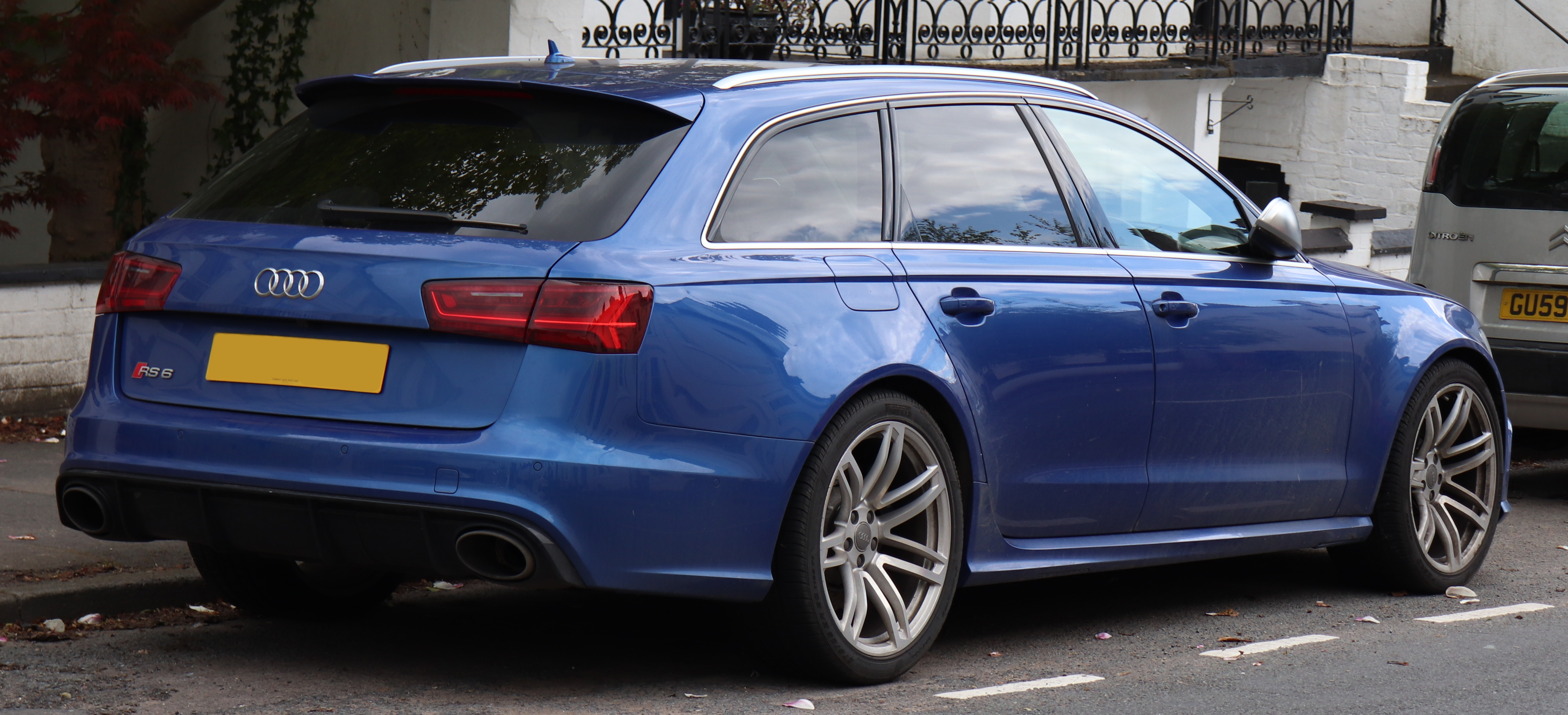
RS6 Avant

The RS6 Avant is a higher performance version of the S6 Avant, with power increased to 560 PS (412 kW; 552 hp) at 5700–6700 rpm and 700 N⋅m (516.3 lbf⋅ft) at 1750–5500 rpm. It features a cylinder on demand system that deactivates intake and exhaust valves of 4 cylinders (2, 3, 5 and 8), eight-speed tiptronic transmission with shortened shift times and D and S driving modes, quattro permanent all-wheel drive system with torque vectoring with self-locking centre differential with an elevated locking value and oil cooler, adaptive air suspension lowering body by 20 mm (1 in) (optional tauter sport suspension plus with Dynamic Ride Control), option is dynamic steering, four internally vented 390 mm (15 in) diameter brake discs in wave design with a wave-like outer contour (optional 420 mm (17 in) diameter carbon fibre-ceramic brake discs with anthracite gray calipers), black six-piston brake calipers (optional red brake calipers), electronic stabilization control with Sport and off modes, high-gloss 20-inch forged wheels in a seven twin-spoke design (optional 21-inch cast wheels in high-gloss silver, polished black or polished titanium-look), matte aluminium applications on the body, high-gloss black protective grille at the front of the car, the bumpers, the fender, sill flares and the large roof spoiler; rear diffuser with two large elliptical exhaust tailpipes, a choice of 9 body colours (including exclusive shade Daytona Gray matte), dial instruments feature black faces and white dials and red needles, flat-bottomed three-spoke multifunction steering wheel, illuminated entry sills, driver information system (DIS) sport RS logos, RS6-specific driver information system, footrest and pedals and switches in the MMI navigation plus terminal in aluminium finish, decorative bezel surrounding the retractable monitor in a piano finish, interior door openers in a delicate double-bar design, standard Carbon inlays (with six additional materials as options), standard black headlining (optional Silver or black Alcantara), RS sport seats with side bolsters and integrated head restraints and RS6 logos upholstered in black Alcantara and leather with diamond quilting at centre sections (optional honeycomb-quilted Valcona leather in either black or Moon Silver), optional power-adjustable deluxe seats with memory function, two sportily molded rear seats (optional three-person bench seat), xenon plus headlights, LED rear lights, a tire-pressure control system, illuminated entry sills, custom driver-information system, parking system plus, cruise control, three-zone automatic air conditioning, MMI navigation plus with MMI touch and the 10-speaker Audi sound system.

Optional packages includes customized quattro badges on the central front air inlet. Carbon appearance package includes alternate front splitter and diffuser shapes. Optional Dynamic package increases top speed to 280 km/h (173.98 mph). Optional Dynamic plus package increases top speed to 305 km/h (189.52 mph). Other options include LED headlights with a unique design, the sport differential on the rear axle, Comfort package, head-up display, the high-performance driver assistance systems, Bang & Olufsen Advanced Sound System with 15 speakers and 1,200 watts of total power, Bluetooth online car phone.

=== Body styles ===
Body types	Saloon	Avant	Allroad quattro	A6L
Model	Years			
A6 hybrid	2012–2014	-	-	-
A6 1.8 TFSI (ultra) (190PS)	2016–2018	2016–2018	?	?
A6 2.0 TFSI (180PS)	2011–	2011?–	-	2012–
A6 2.0 TFSI (211PS)	2011–	-	-	-
A6 2.8 FSI (204PS)	2011–	2011?–	-	-
A6 2.8 FSI quattro (204PS)	2011–	2011?–	-	-
A6L 2.5 30 FSI (190PS)	–	-	-	2012–
A6 3.0 TFSI quattro (300PS)	2011–	2011?–	-	-
A6 3.0 TFSI quattro (310PS)	2012–	2012–	2012–	-
A6 L 2.8 35 FSI (220PS)	–	-	-	2012–
A6 L 2.8 35 FSI quattro (220PS)	–	-	-	2012–
A6 L 3.0 50 TFSI quattro (299PS)	–	-	-	2012–
S6 4.0 TFSI quattro (420PS)	2012–	2012–	-	-
RS6 4.0 TFSI quattro (560PS)	-	2013–2018	-	-
A6 2.0 TDI	2011–	2011-2017	2016–	-
A6 3.0 TDI (204PS)	2011–	2011?–	-	-
A6 3.0 TDI quattro (204PS)	2011–	2011?–	2012–	-
A6 3.0 TDI quattro (245PS)	2011–	2011?–	2012–	-
A6 3.0 TDI clean diesel quattro (245PS)	2011–	2011?–	-	-
A6 3.0 TDI quattro (313PS)	2011–	2011?–	2012–	-

In some specific European markets (like France), facelift models (2016 and onwards) received a never before offered 1.8 TFSI (190 PS) petrol engine. Models paired with the 7-speed automatic S tronic gearbox have an "ultra" tag added at the end of their name.

A6L with 2.0 TFSI (180 PS) was sold as A6L TFSI in China.

In the US, Canada, UK A6 Saloon with 3.0 TFSI Quattro (310 PS) replaced the A6 3.0 TFSI Quattro (300 PS).

In the UK, A6 Avant with 3.0 TFSI Quattro (310 PS) replaced the A6 3.0 TFSI Quattro (300 PS).

=== Engines ===
Petrol engines
Model	Years	Type/code	Power, torque at rpm
A6 hybrid	2012–2014	electric motor, 1.3 kWh 39 kW lithium ion battery	45 PS (33 kW; 44 hp), 211 N⋅m (156 lb⋅ft)
A6 hybrid	2012–2014	1,984 cc (121.1 cu in) I4 turbo	211 PS (155 kW; 208 hp) at 4300–6000, 350 N⋅m (258 lb⋅ft) at 1500–4200
A6 hybrid	2012–2014	combined	245 PS (180 kW; 242 hp), 480 N⋅m (354 lb⋅ft)
A6 1.8 TFSI (ultra) (190PS)	2016–2018	1,798 cc (109.7 cu in) I4 turbo	190 PS (140 kW; 187 hp) at 4200–6200, 320 N⋅m (236 lb⋅ft) at 1400–4100
A6 2.0 TFSI (180PS)	2011–2018	1,984 cc (121.1 cu in) I4 turbo	180 PS (132 kW; 178 hp) at 4000–6000, 320 N⋅m (236 lb⋅ft) at 1500–3900
A6 2.0 TFSI (211PS)	2011–2018	1,984 cc (121.1 cu in) I4 turbo	211 PS (155 kW; 208 hp) at 6500, 350 N⋅m (258 lb⋅ft) at 3250
A6 2.8 FSI (204PS)	2011–2018	2,773 cc (169.2 cu in) V6	220 PS (162 kW; 217 hp) at 5250–6250, 280 N⋅m (207 lb⋅ft) at 3000–5000
A6 2.8 FSI quattro (204PS)	2011–2018	2,773 cc (169.2 cu in) V6	220 PS (162 kW; 217 hp) at 5250–6250, 280 N⋅m (207 lb⋅ft) at 3000–5000
A6 2.5 FSI (190PS)	2012–2018	2,498 cc (152.4 cu in) V6	190 PS (140 kW; 187 hp) at 5500–6500, 250 N⋅m (184 lb⋅ft) at 3000–4750
A6 3.0 TFSI quattro (300PS)	2011–2012	2,995 cc (182.8 cu in) V6 supercharged	300 PS (221 kW; 296 hp) at 5250–6500, 440 N⋅m (325 lb⋅ft)} at 2900–4500
A6 3.0 TFSI quattro (310PS)	2012–2018	2,995 cc (182.8 cu in) V6 supercharged	310 PS (228 kW; 306 hp) at 5500–6500, 440 N⋅m (325 lb⋅ft) at 2900–4500
A6 L 2.8 35 FSI (220PS)	2012–2018	2,773 cc (169.2 cu in) V6	220 PS (162 kW; 217 hp) at 5750–6500, 280 N⋅m (207 lb⋅ft) at 3000–5000
A6 L 2.8 35 FSI quattro (220PS)	2012–2018	2,773 cc (169.2 cu in) V6	220 PS (162 kW; 217 hp) at 5750–6500, 280 N⋅m (207 lb⋅ft) at 3000–5000
A6 L 3.0 50 TFSI quattro (299PS)	2012–2018	2,995 cc (182.8 cu in) V6 supercharged	300 PS (221 kW; 296 hp) at 5250–6500, 440 N⋅m (325 lb⋅ft) at 2900–4500
S6 4.0 TFSI quattro (420PS)	2012–2018	3,993 cc (243.7 cu in) V8 twin turbo	420 PS (309 kW; 414 hp) at 5500–6400, 550 N⋅m (406 lb⋅ft) at 1400–5300
RS6 4.0 TFSI quattro (560PS)	2013–2018	3,993 cc (243.7 cu in) V8 twin scroll twin turbo	560 PS (412 kW; 552 hp) at 5700–6700, 700 N⋅m (516 lb⋅ft) at 1750–5500

Diesel engines
Model	Years	Type/code	Power, torque at rpm
A6 2.0 TDI	2011–	1,968 cc (120.1 cu in) I4 turbo	177 PS (130 kW; 175 hp) at 4200, 380 N⋅m (280 lbf⋅ft) at 1750–2500
A6 2.0 TDI Ultra	2014–	1,968 cc (120.1 cu in) I4 turbo	190 PS (140 kW; 187 hp) at 4200, 400 N⋅m (295 lbf⋅ft) at 1750–3000
A6 3.0 TDI (204PS)	2011–	2,967 cc (181.1 cu in) V6 turbo	204 PS (150 kW; 201 hp) at 3250–4500, 400 N⋅m (295 lbf⋅ft) at 1250–3500
A6 3.0 TDI quattro (204PS)	2011–	2,967 cc (181.1 cu in) V6 turbo	204 PS (150 kW; 201 hp) at 3250–4500, 450 N⋅m (331.90 lbf⋅ft) at 1250–3500
A6 3.0 TDI quattro (245PS)	2011–	2,967 cc (181.1 cu in) V6 turbo	245 PS (180 kW; 242 hp) at 4000–4500, 500 N⋅m (368.78 lbf⋅ft) at 1400–3250 (2011–) 245 PS (180 kW; 242 hp) at 4000–4500, 580 N⋅m (427.79 lbf⋅ft) at 1750–2500 (2012)
A6 3.0 TDI clean diesel quattro (245PS)	2011–	2,967 cc (181.1 cu in) V6 turbo	245 PS (180 kW; 242 hp) at 4000–4500, 500 N⋅m (368.78 lbf⋅ft) at 1400–3250
A6 3.0 BiTDI quattro (313PS)	2011–	2,967 cc (181.1 cu in) V6 Biturbo	313 PS (230 kW; 309 hp) at 3900–4500, 650 N⋅m (479.42 lbf⋅ft) at 1450–2800

For A6 3.0 TDI Quattro (245PS), the 580 N-m model replaced the 500 N-m model in the UK.

=== Transmissions ===
Petrol engines
Model	Years	Standard	Optional
A6 hybrid	2012–	8-speed tiptronic	-
A6 1.8 TFSI (190PS)	2016–	6-speed manual	-
A6 1.8 TFSI ultra (190PS)	2016–	7-speed S tronic	-
A6 2.0 TFSI (180PS)	2011–	6-speed manual	multitronic
A6 2.0 TFSI (211PS)	2011–	multitronic	-
A6 2.0 TFSI (211PS)	2011–	8-speed tiptronic	-
A6 2.0 45 TFSI (245PS)	2017–	7-speed S tronic	
A6 2.8 FSI (204PS)	2011–	6-speed manual	multitronic
A6 FSI quattro (204PS)	2011–	7-speed S tronic	-
A6 2.5 FSI (190PS)	2012–	multitronic	-
A6 3.0 TFSI quattro (300PS)	2011–	7-speed S tronic	-
A6 3.0 TFSI quattro (310PS)	2012–	Saloon: 7-speed S tronic, 8-speed tiptronic Avant: 7-speed S tronic Allroad quattro: 7-speed S tronic	-
A6 L 2.8 35 FSI (220PS)	2012–	multitronic	-
A6 L 2.8 35 FSI quattro (220PS)	2012–	7-speed S tronic	-
A6 L 3.0 50 TFSI quattro (299PS)	2012–	7-speed S tronic	-
S6 4.0 TFSI quattro (420PS, 450PS)	2012–	7-speed S tronic	-
RS6 4.0 TFSI quattro (560PS, 605PS)	2012–	8-speed tiptronic	-

Diesel engines
Model	Years	Standard	Optional
A6 2.0 TDI	2011–2014	6-speed manual	8-speed multitronic
A6 2.0 TDI	2014–2018	6-speed manual	7-speed S tronic
A6 3.0 TDI (204PS)	2011–2014	6-speed manual	8-speed multitronic
A6 3.0 TDI (218PS)	2014–	7-speed S tronic	-
A6 3.0 TDI quattro (204PS, 245PS)	2011–2014	7-speed S tronic	-
A6 3.0 TDI quattro (190PS, 218PS, 272PS)	2014–2018	7-speed S tronic	-
A6 3.0 TDI quattro (313PS, 320PS, 326PS)	2011–2018	8-speed tiptronic	-

For A6 Saloon 3.0 TFSI Quattro (310 PS), 7-speed S-Tronic is used in the UK model, 8-speed Tiptronic is used in the US, Canada models.

A6 3.0 TDI quattro (313 PS) was sold as A6 3.0 BiTDI quattro in the UK.

=== Safety ===
ANCAP test results* Audi A6 4 cylinder diesel engine variants (2011)
Test	Score
Overall	5 /5 stars
Frontal offset	14.91/16
Side impact	15/16
Pole	2/2
Seat belt reminders	2/3
Whiplash protection	Good
Pedestrian protection	Marginal
Electronic stability control	Standard

Euro NCAP test results* LHD, 4-door saloon (2011)
Test	Points	%
Overall:	5 /5 stars	
Adult occupant:	33	91%
Child occupant:	41	83%
Pedestrian:	15	41%
Safety assist:	6	86%

=== Marketing ===
As part of the Audi A6 Avant launch in the UK, BBH London, Knucklehead, The Whitehouse, The Mill produced the 'Hummingbird' TV commercial, directed by Daniel Barber. The commercial premiered during the ITV1's coverage of the Rugby World Cup. The commercial was to imagine what a bird designed by Audi would look like and to reflect the car's ultra-lightweight technology. Johann Strauss's 'Open Road, Open Sky' was sung by legendary American baritone and automobile lover John Charles Thomas. In addition, 60 second and 30 versions of the ads were supported by press, print and radio campaigns, as well as a presence on the Daily Telegraph's iPad app.

As part of the Audi A6 launch in Taiwan, 2011 Audi Fashion Festival featured the theme of 'A6- The sum of Progress', including Shiatzy Chen, Kiki Huang, Robyn Hung and an artistic jewelry brand, Chen Chan.

As part of the 2013 Audi S6 sedan launch in the US market, 3 different versions of 'Prom' commercial were premiered during 2013 Super Bowl game. The 60-second ad, created by Venables Bell & Partners, features a teenage boy. Voters were to decide their favourite version of the commercial 24 hours on Friday before the Super Bowl game, with winning entry shown on Saturday at Audi's YouTube channel and during the actual game at CBS.

As part of the RS6 Avant launch, Audi Land of Quattro Alpen Tour 2013 featured RS6 Avant begins on September 23, travelling across twelve driving stages in 6 countries (Klagenfurt – the capital of Carinthia, Austria, Monaco).

In the Audi RS6 Avant TV commercial titled 'Perfect Fit', it featured a 2012 Audi R18 with the high downforce sprint bodywork in the guise of Audi R18 e‑tron quattro.

== C8 (Typ 4K, 2018) ==
Fifth generation (C8)
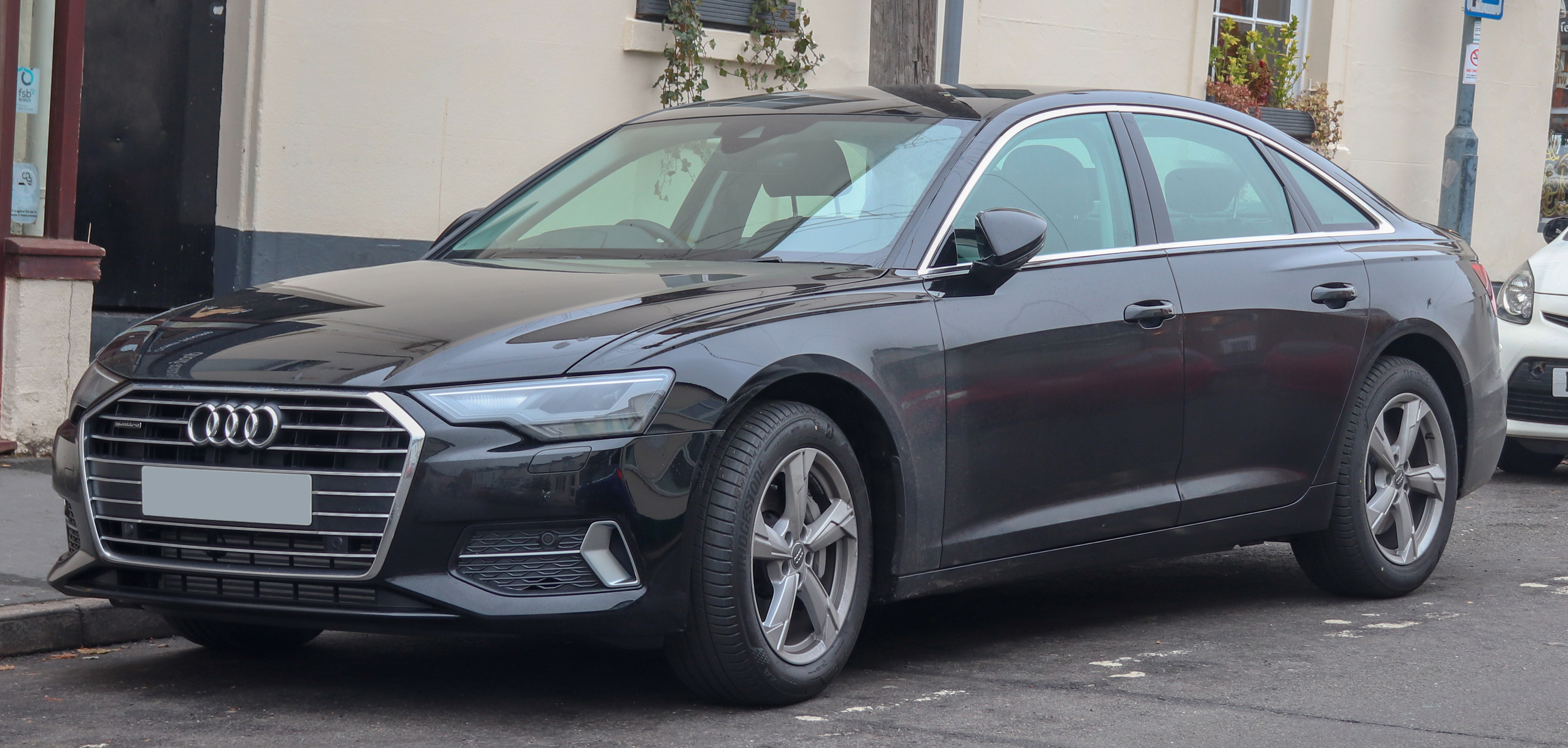

Overview
- Model code: 4K
- Production: April 2018–2025; January 2019–2026 (China)
- Model years: 2019–2025
- Assembly: Germany: Neckarsulm; China: Changchun (FAW-VW, A6L only); India: Aurangabad (Audi India)
- Designer: Phillipe Römers; Helmut Jung (Avant)

Body and chassis
- Platform: Volkswagen Group MLB Evo platform
- Related: Audi S6; Audi RS6 Avant; Audi A7

Powertrain
- Engine: Petrol; 2.0 L TFSI I4; 2.0 L TFSI MHEV I4; 2.9 L TFSI twin-turbo V6 (S6); 3.0 L TFSI turbo V6; 4.0 L TFSI twin-turbo V8 (RS6); PHEV engine; 2.0 L TFSI I4; Diesel; 2.0 L TDI I4; 3.0 L TDI MHEV V6
- Electric motor: 48V mild-hybrid system (MHEV); AC synchronous electric motor (50 / 55 TFSIe)
- Transmission: 7-speed dual clutch S tronic 8-speed automatic tiptronic
- Hybrid drivetrain: MHEV (55 TFSI / S6 TFSI / RS6 TFSI / 45 TDI / 50 TDI); PHEV (55 TFSI e)

Dimensions
- Wheelbase: 2,924 mm (115.1 in); 3,024 mm (119.1 in) (LWB)
- Length: 4,939 mm (194.4 in); 5,050 mm (198.8 in) (LWB)
- Width: 1,886 mm (74.3 in)
- Height: 1,457 mm (57.4 in); Avant: 1,467 mm (57.8 in)

The new A6 was unveiled ahead of the 2018 Geneva Motor Show, and went on sale in June 2018. All engines are offered with a mild hybrid drivetrain that can reduce fuel consumption by up to 0.7 litres per 100 kilometres for the V6-engined vehicles. The A6 will be offered in seven new exterior colours and seven colours which are available in current models.

German models went on sale in June 2018. Early models include the 50 TDI quattro.

The fifth generation of the A6 is also available as an 'Avant' (Audi terminology for a station wagon). High-performance variants of the 'Avant' were also produced, with the S6 Avant arriving in 2019 alongside the RS6 Avant.

Early European models include 40 TDI, 45 TDI, 50 TDI.

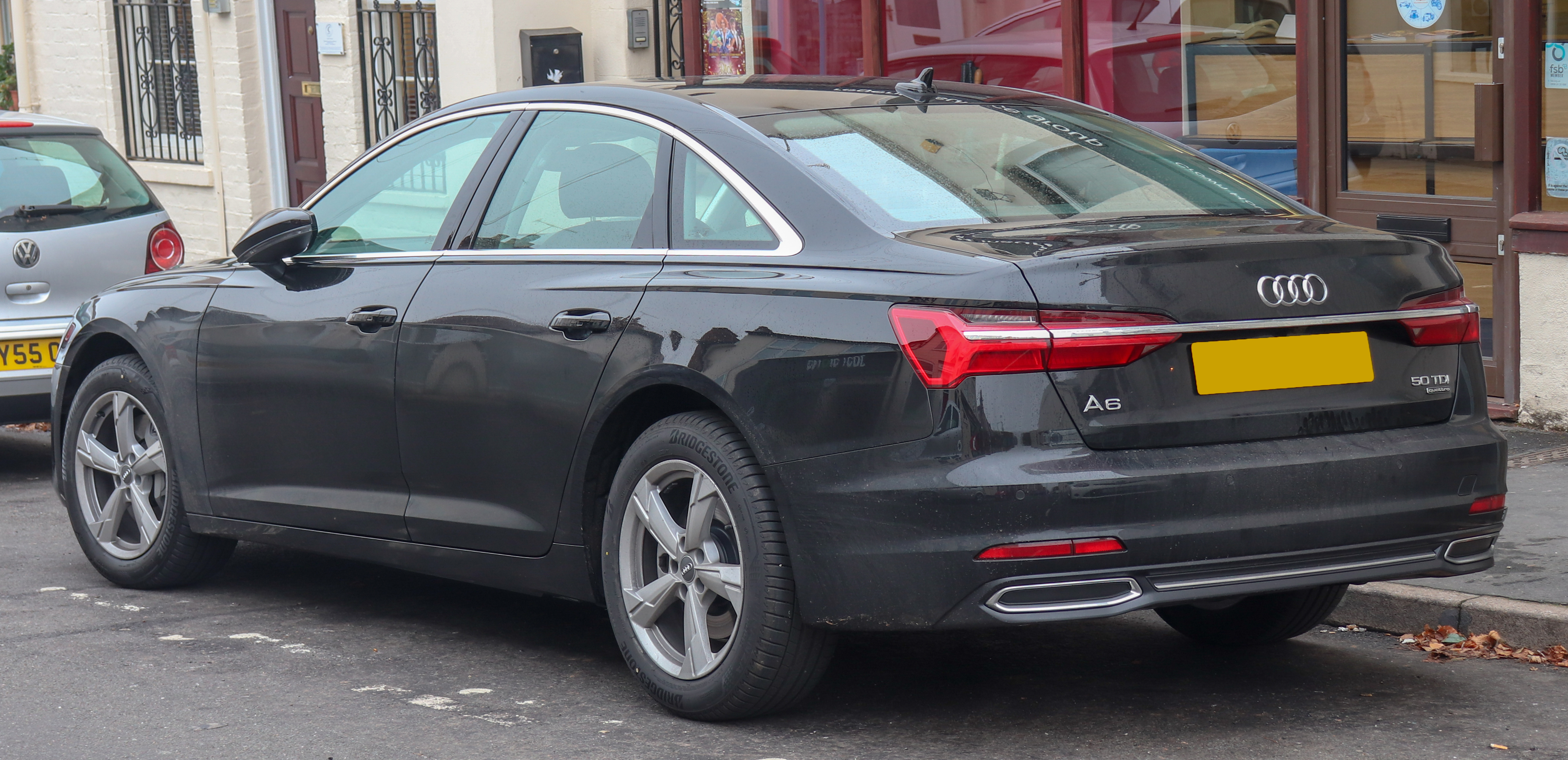
Rear view

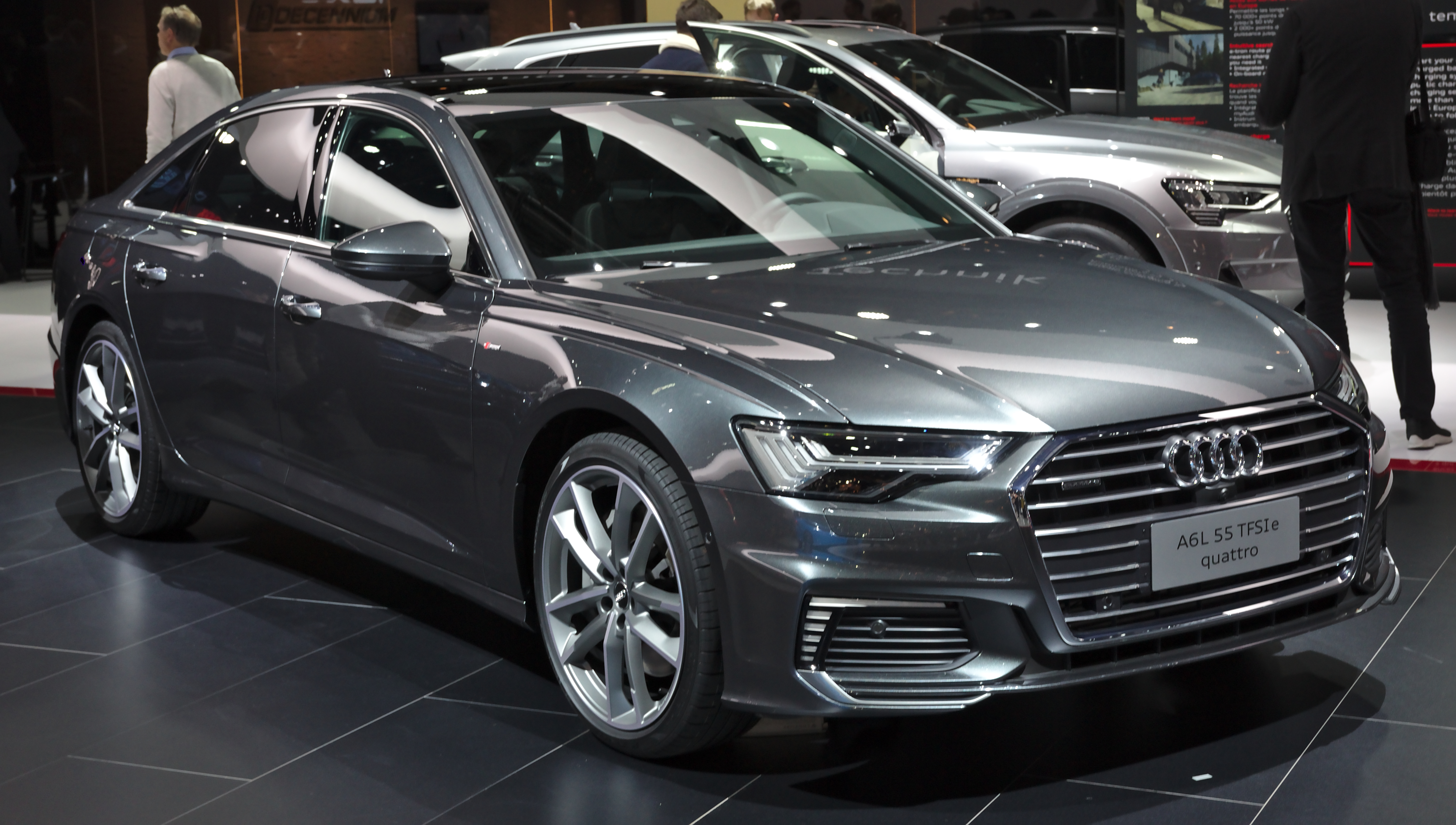
Audi A6L (China)

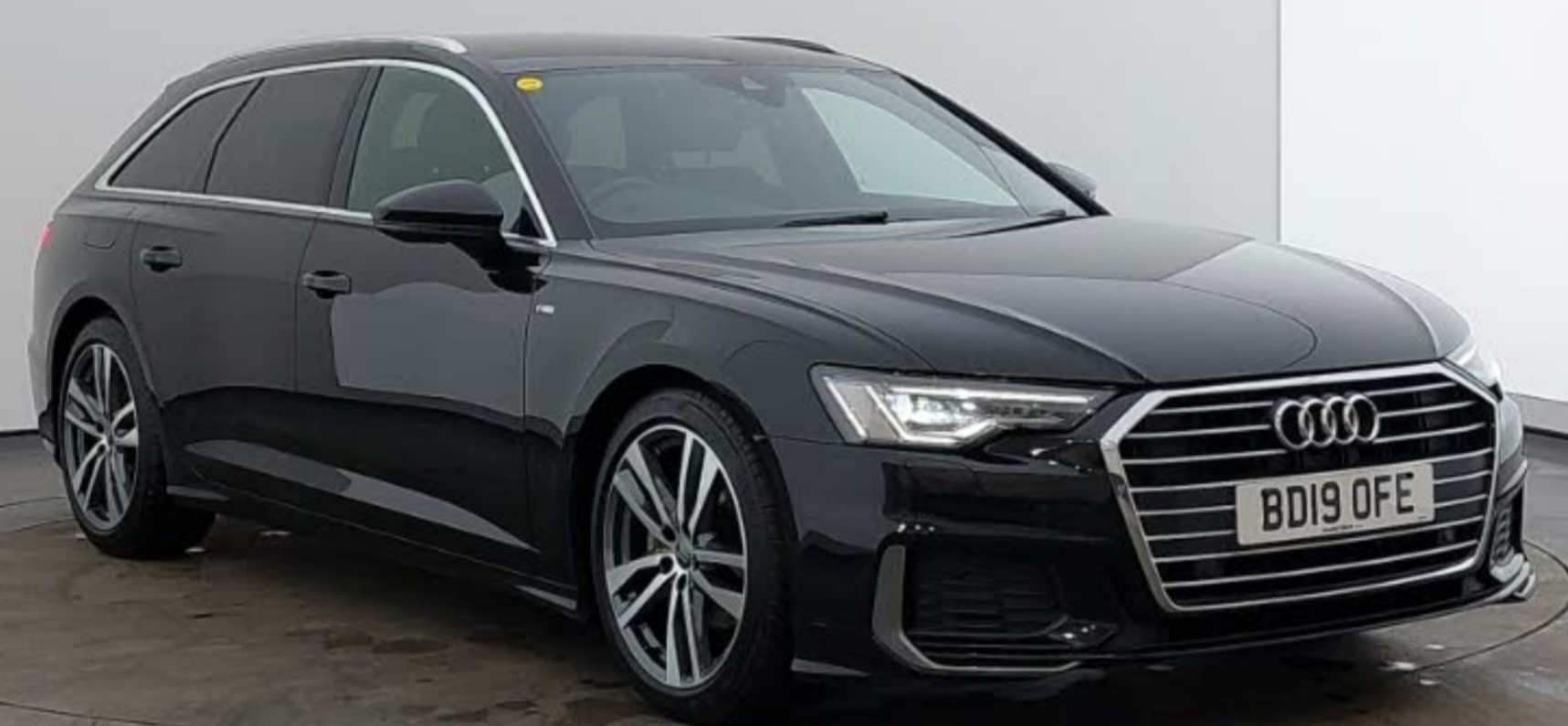
Audi A6 Avant (Europe)

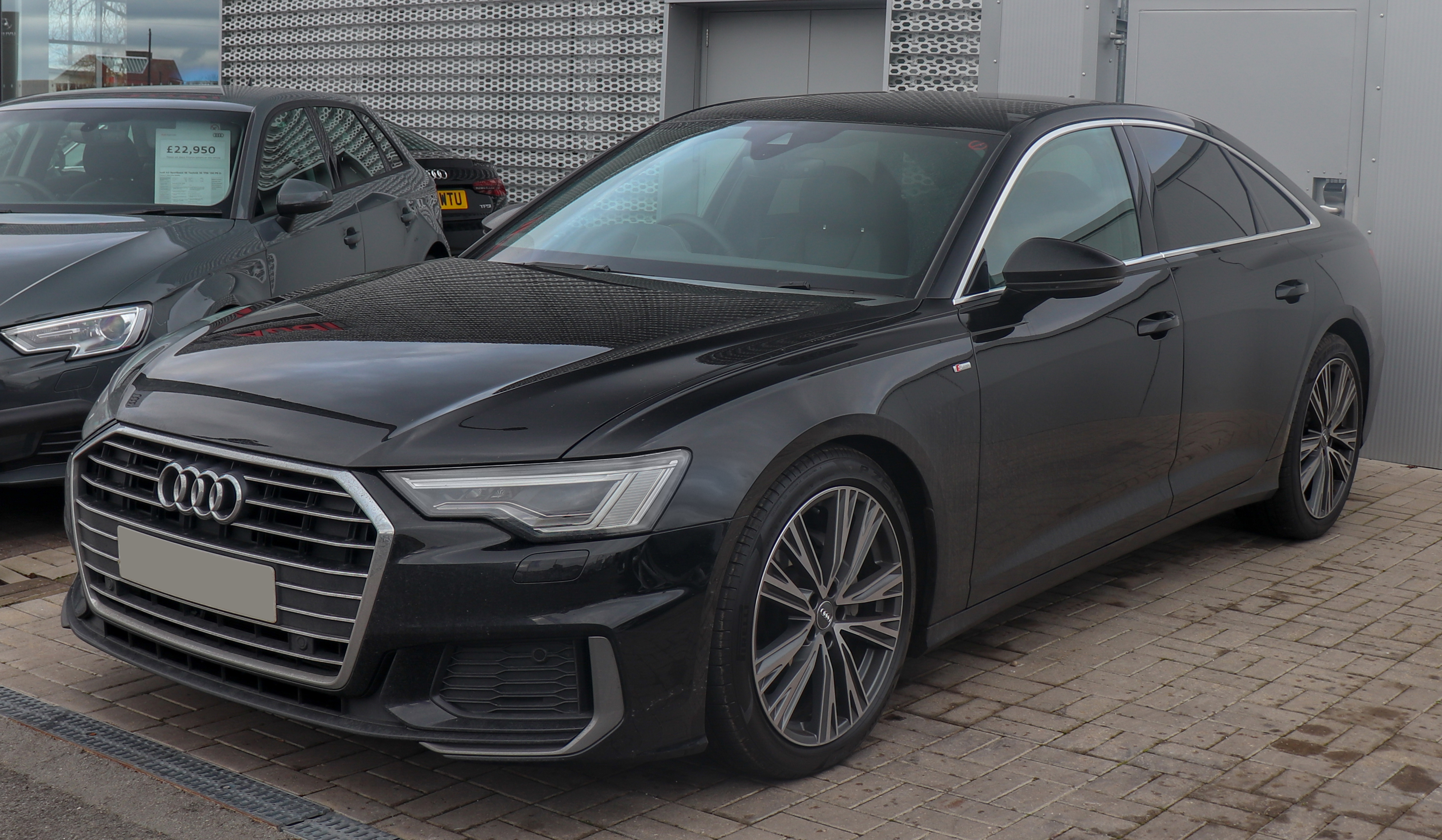
Audi A6 C8 S Line

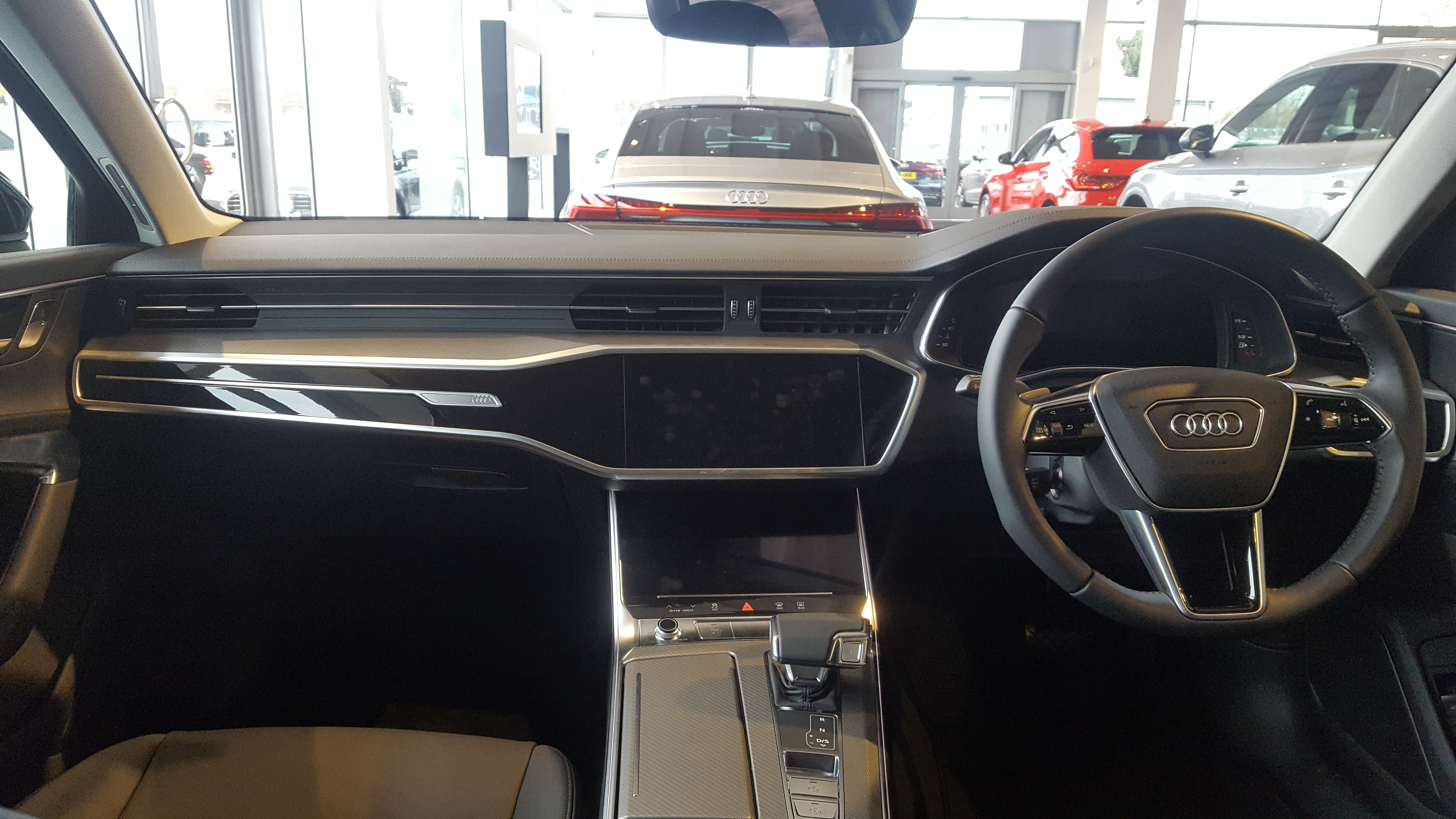
Interior, A6 C8

=== S6 (2019–2025) ===
The S6 is a performance version of the A6. Sitting between the base A6 and high-performance RS6, the S model is powered by a 2.9-litre twin-turbo V6 with 40:60 front and rear axle all-wheel drive. Additional equipment includes wheel-selective torque control, damping control (optional adaptive air suspension), lowered body by 20 mm (0.8 in) (with air suspension, auto mode lowers body by further 10 mm (0.4 in)), optional sport differential, electronic chassis platform with 5 drive select modes, 400 mm (15.7 in) front and 350 mm (13.8 in) rear brake discs with black (optional red) aluminium calipers (optional six-piston ceramic brake system includes 400 mm (15.7 in) front and 370 mm (14.6 in) rear brake discs), 20-inch wheels (optional 21-inch wheels), 255/40 tires (optional 20-inch Performance tires), sport seats with embossed S logo (optional integrated head restraints, embossed S logo and rhombus pattern) with optional ventilation and massage, Alcantara (optional Valcona) seat upholstery in colours black, rotor gray or arras red with contrasting stitching; aluminium inlays (optional fine grain ash), optional flat-bottomed rim steering wheel, stainless steel footrest and pedal caps, and illuminated aluminium sill trims with S logo.

3.0 TDI model includes 7 kW (9.5 PS; 9.4 hp) electric powered compressor, Euro 6d temp emission standard compliance.

European models went on sale in mid-2019. Early United States, Asia and Middle East models include 2.9 TFSI.

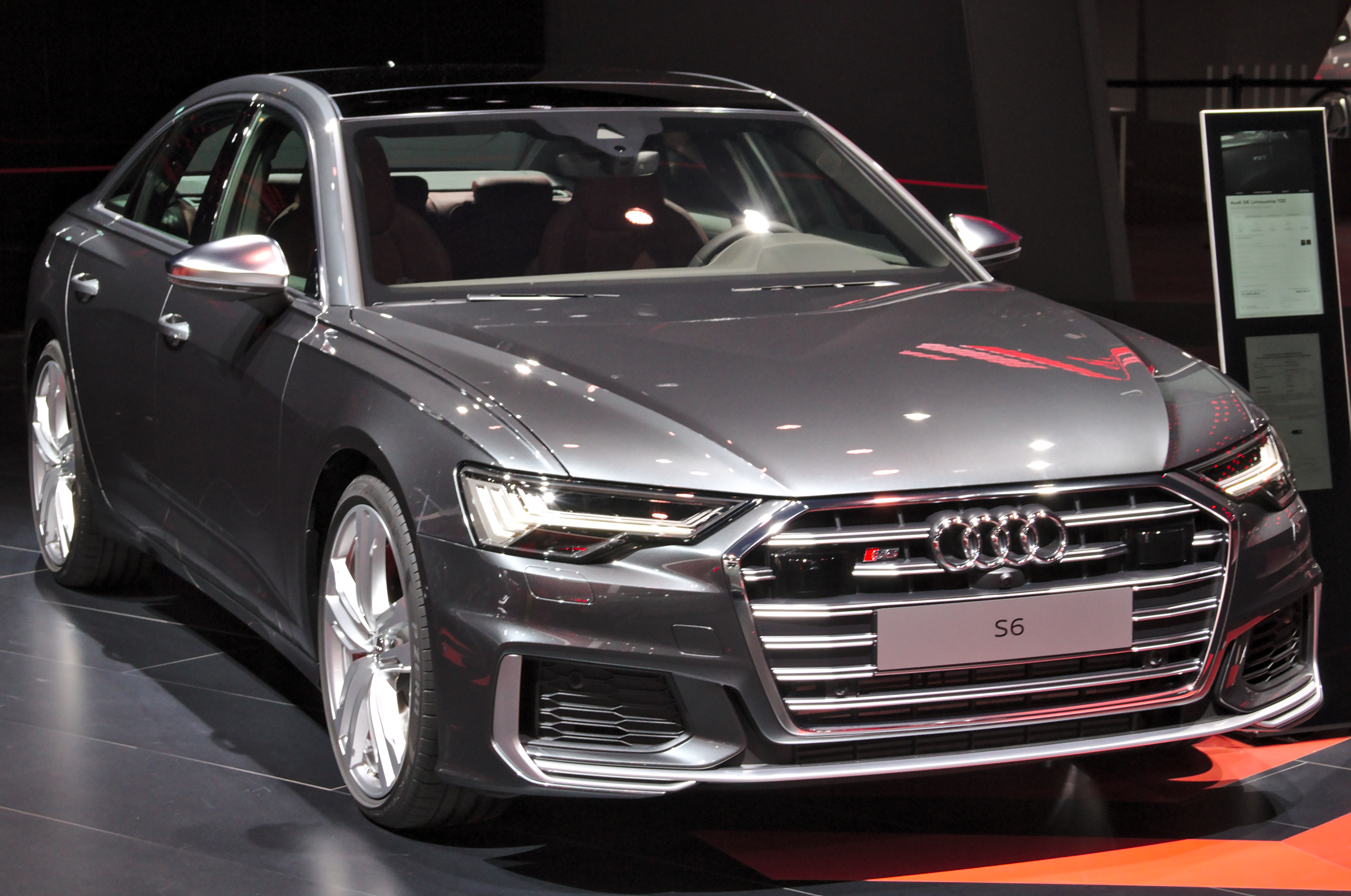
Audi S6

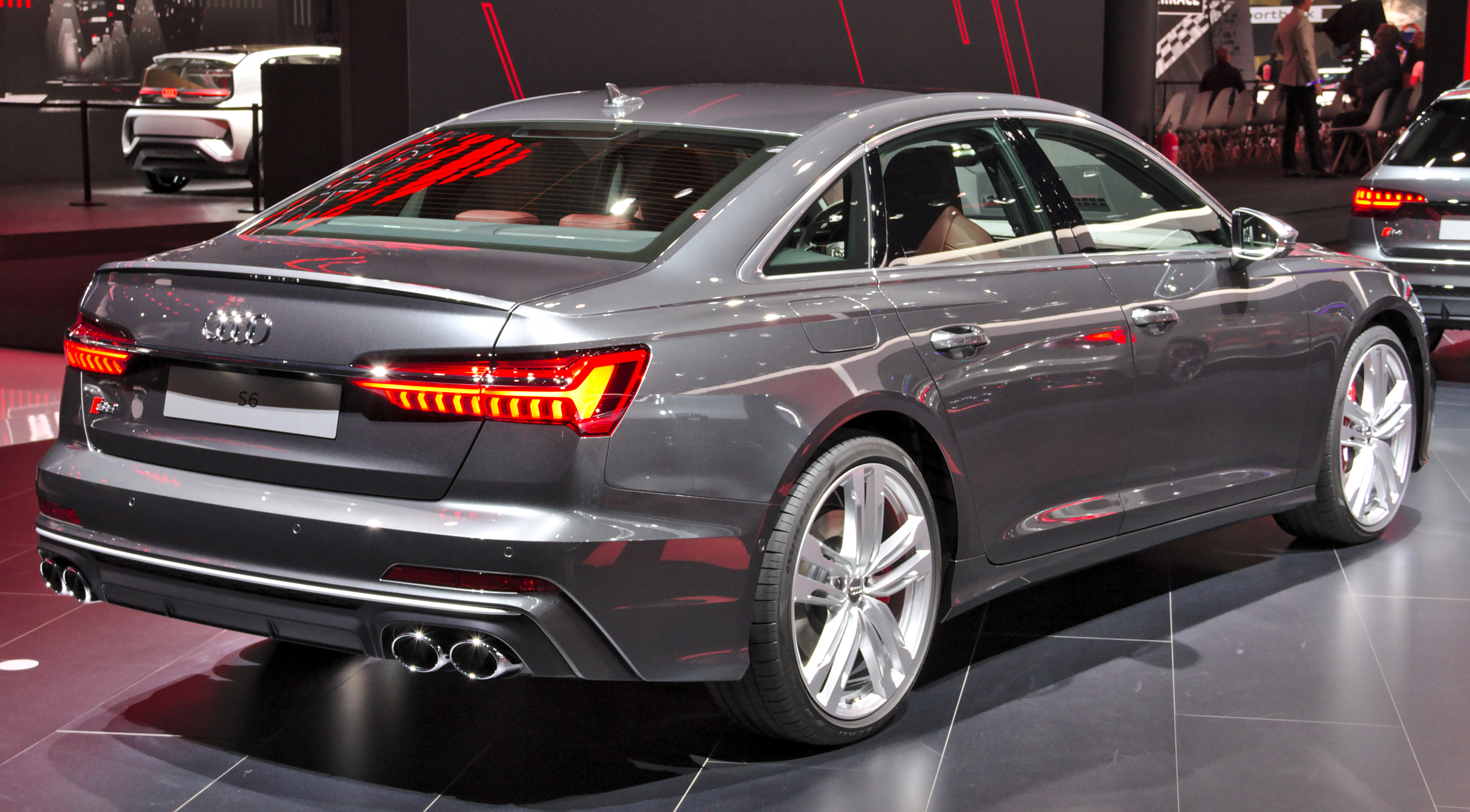
Audi S6

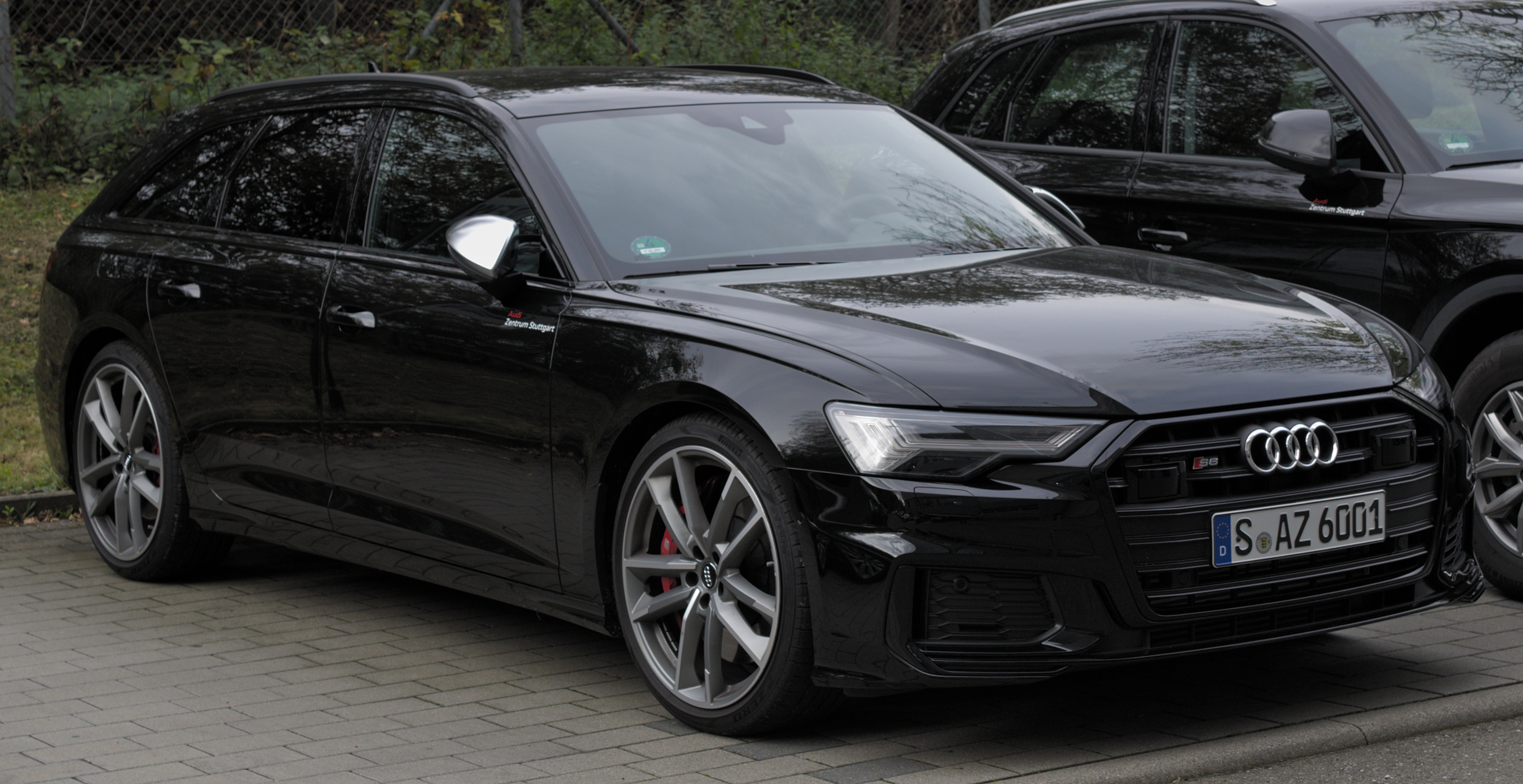
Audi S6 Avant

=== A6 allroad quattro (2019–2025) ===
The allroad Quattro is a high-riding wagon. Equipment includes a choice of three body colours (gavial green, glacier white, Soho brown), 19-inch wheels in exclusive design, black sport seats with leather/Alcantara upholstery, aluminium inlays and illuminated door sill trims.

European models went on sale in June 2019. Early models include 45 TDI, 50 TDI, 55 TDI.

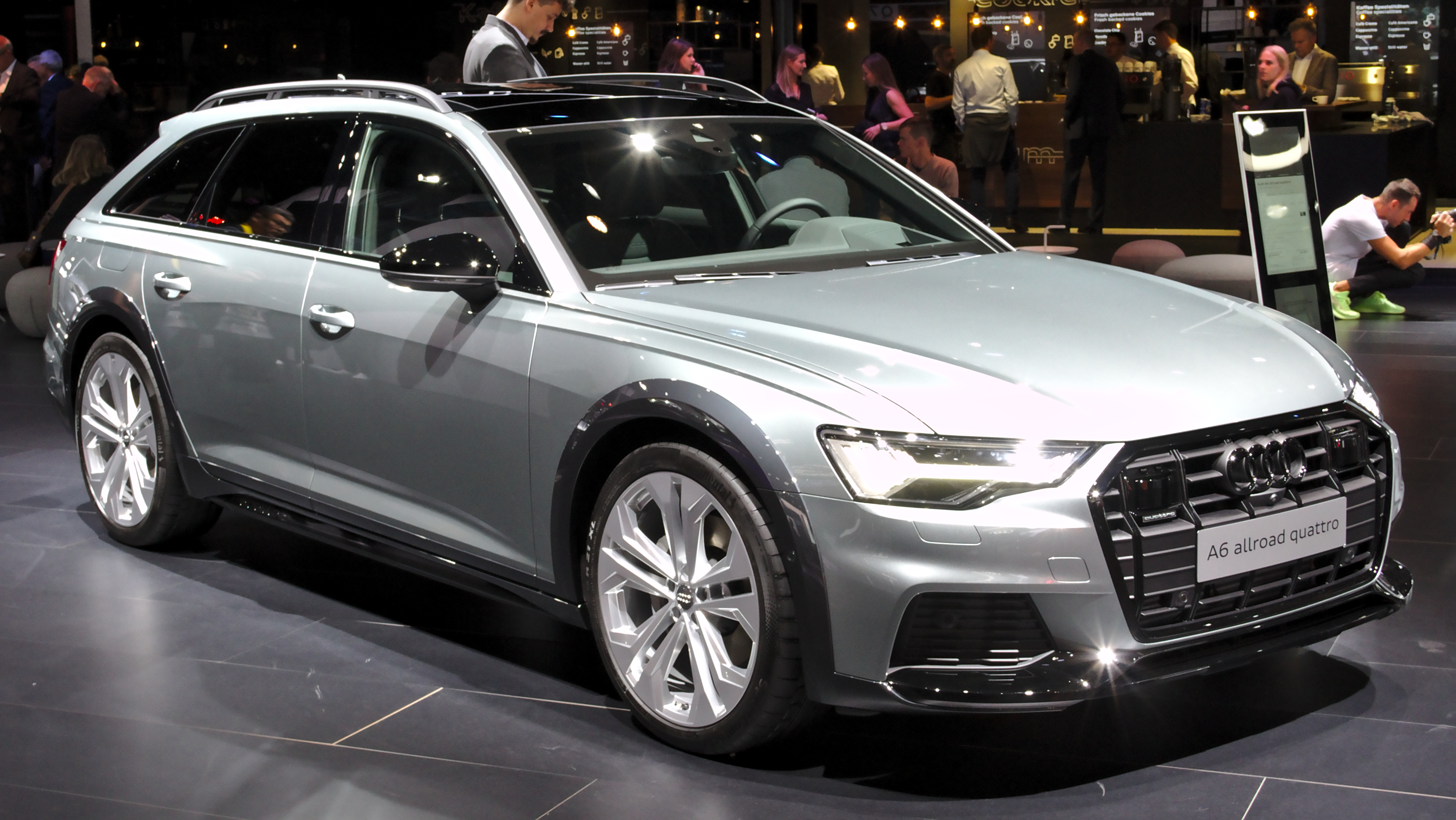
Audi A6 Allroad

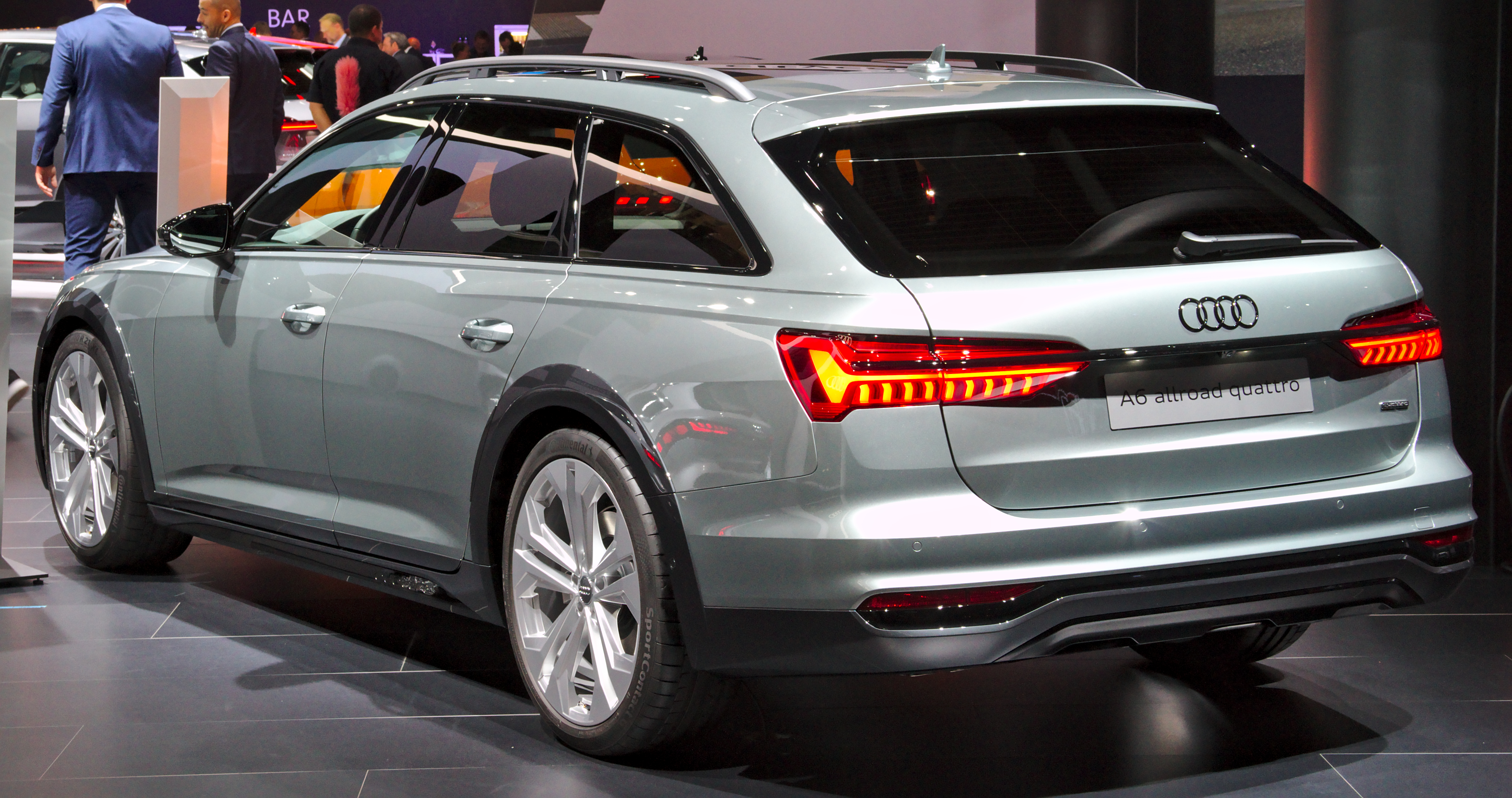
Audi A6 Allroad

=== RS 6 Avant (2019–2025) ===
The RS6 is a high-performance version of the A6. Sitting above the base A6 and mid-tier S6, the RS model is powered by a 4.0-litre twin-turbo V8 and all-wheel drive. The body is modified with 40 mm (1.6 in) wider body on each side with flared wheel arches, front headlights from Audi A7, optional RS-specific Matrix LED laser headlight with darkened trims with dynamic turn signal, 4.0 TFSI engine rated 600 PS (441 kW; 592 hp) at 6250 rpm and 800 N⋅m (590 lb⋅ft) at 2050-4500 rpm with a separate lithium-ion battery. The centre diff has a 40:60 torque split front to rear, but in certain situations can direct up to 70 per cent of the power forwards or as much as 85 per cent to the rear wheels and is also fitted with wheel-selective torque control. The RS 6 has RS adaptive air suspension or RS sport suspension plus with Dynamic Ride Control (DRC), progressive steering, Audi drive select dynamic handling system with six profiles, 21-inch cast aluminium wheels in 10-spoke star design with 275/35 size tires (optional 22-inch 5-V-spoke trapezoid design wheels in silver, matt titanium look, gloss turned finish, and gloss anthracite black, gloss turned finish with 285/30 tires), 420 mm (16.5 in) front and 370 mm (14.6 in) rear steel brake discs with black (optional red) calipers (RS ceramic brakes includes 440 mm (17.3 in) front and 370 mm (14.6 in) brake discs with gray, red or blue calipers), 'RS Monitor' MMI touch response display, optional head-up display, aluminium shift paddles, RS and RS 6 logos at steering wheel interior, seats and the illuminated front door sill trims; seats in black pearl Nappa leather/Alcantara upholstery with RS embossing and rhombus pattern (optional perforated Valcona leather with honeycomb pattern and RS embossing), optional carbon, wood natural, gray-brown, or matt aluminium inlays, optional swiveling trailer towing hitch with electric release, optional camera-based trailer assist. RS design packages (red and gray) includes steering wheel rim, gear lever gaiter and knee pads in Alcantara with contrasting stitching; belt straps with colour edging, RS floor mats. Dynamic package adds quattro sport differential dynamic all-wheel steering, increased top speed to 280 km/h (174.0 mph). Dynamic package plus package adds dynamic package feature, plus increased top speed to 305 km/h (189.5 mph).

European models went on sale in end of 2019.

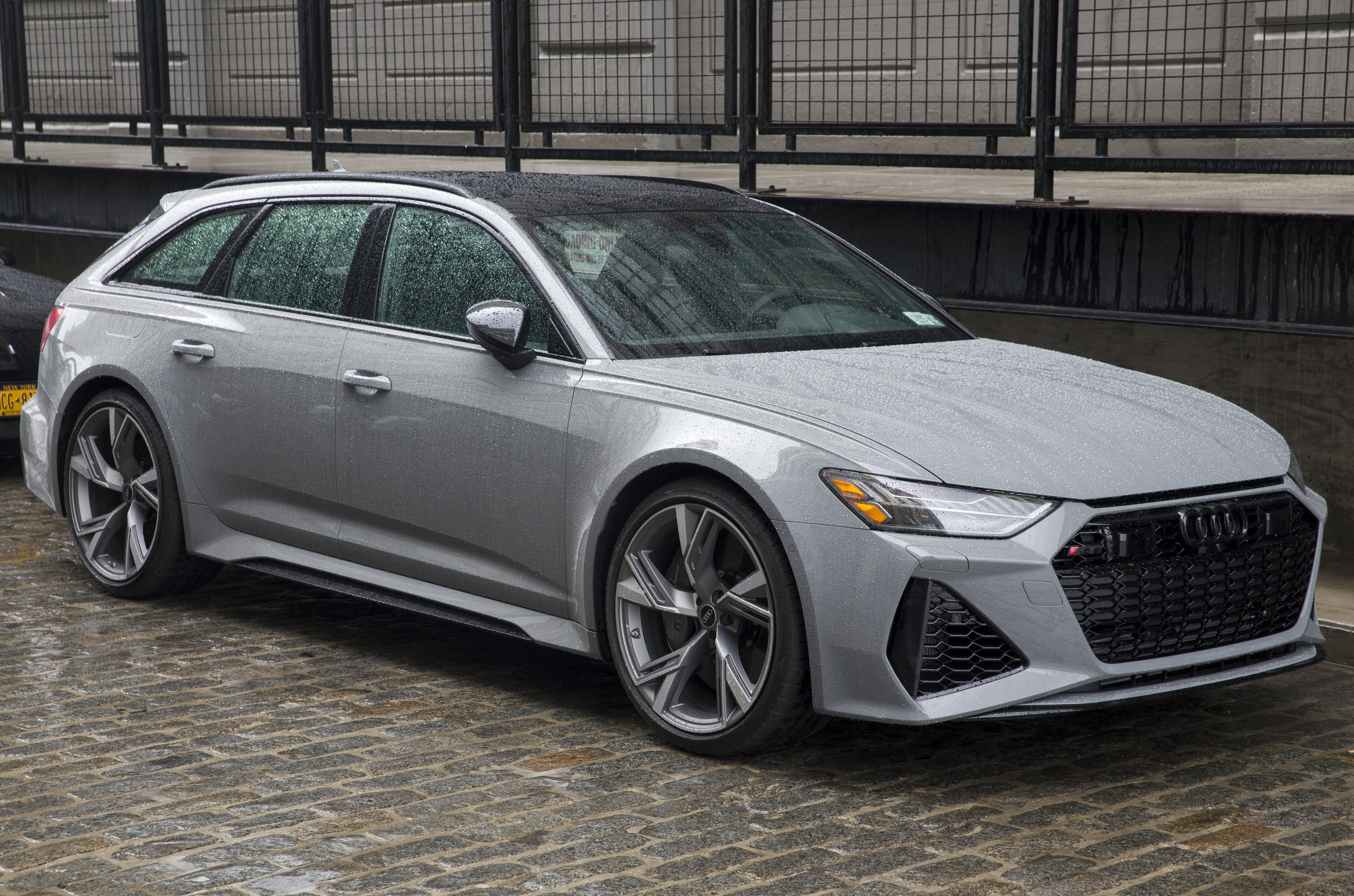
Audi RS6 Avant

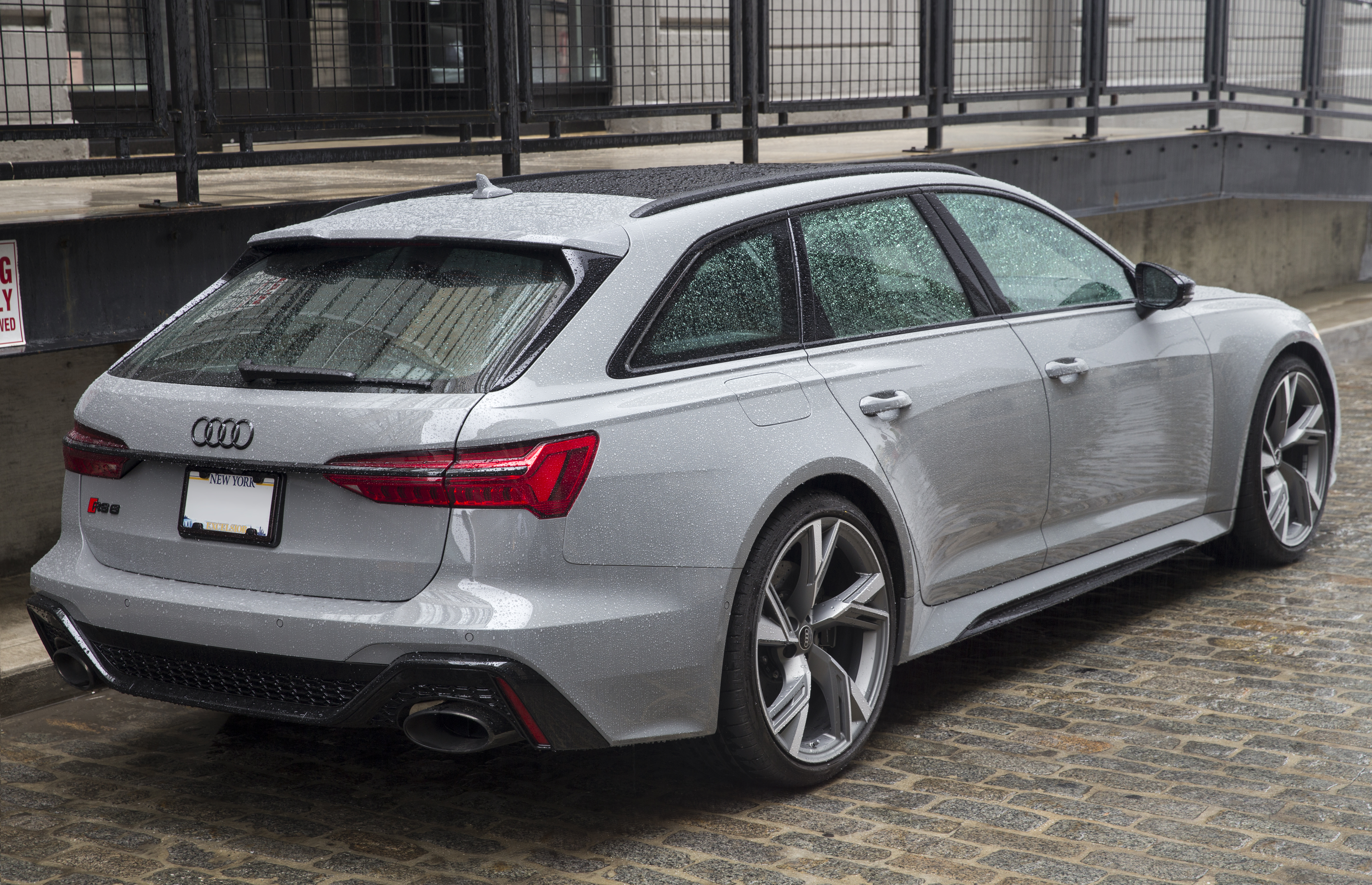
Audi RS6 Avant

=== A6 e-tron concept (2021) ===
The A6 e-tron is a battery electric version of the A6. It launched with both the standard A6 and high performance S6 versions in both liftback and wagon body styles, branded as Sportback and Avant respectively. It includes a 100 kWh battery, 22-inch wheels, and LED projectors built in into each side of the body.

The all new Audi A6 E-tron was released in early 2025.

=== Engines ===
All variants are offered in mild hybrid engines as standard, which include a 48-volt MHEV system.

Petrol Engines
Model	Years	Type	Power	Torque	0–100 km/h (0–62 mph)
A6 45 TFSI quattro	2019–present	1,984 cc (121.1 cu in) I4 turbo	245 PS (180 kW; 242 bhp) at 5000–6500 rpm	370 N⋅m (273 lb⋅ft) at 1600–4300 rpm	6.0s
A6 55 TFSI quattro	2018–present	2,995 cc (182.8 cu in) V6 twin-scroll turbo	340 PS (250 kW; 335 bhp) at 5000–6400 rpm	500 N⋅m (369 lb⋅ft) at 1370–4500 rpm	5.1s
S6 2.9 TFSI quattro	2019–present	2,894 cc (176.6 cu in) V6 twin-turbo	450 PS (331 kW; 444 bhp) at 6700 rpm	600 N⋅m (443 lb⋅ft) at 1900 rpm	4.4s
RS6 Avant 4.0 TFSI quattro	2019–present	3,996 cc (243.9 cu in) V8 twin-turbo	600 PS (441 kW; 592 bhp) at 6000–6250 rpm	800 N⋅m (590 lb⋅ft) at 2050–4000 rpm	3.6s

Plug-in-Hybrid engines
Model	Years	Type	Power at rpm	Torque at rpm	0–100 km/h (0–62 mph)
A6 50 TFSI e quattro	2021–present	1,984 cc (121.1 cu in) I4 turbo + 143 hp electric motor + 17.9 kWh battery	299 PS (220 kW; 295 bhp) at 5000–6000 rpm	450 N⋅m (332 lb⋅ft) at 1600–4500 rpm	6.2s
A6 55 TFSI e quattro	2019–present	1,984 cc (121.1 cu in) I4 turbo + 143 hp electric motor + 14.1 kWh battery	367 PS (270 kW; 362 bhp) at 5000–6000 rpm	500 N⋅m (369 lb⋅ft) at 1600–4500 rpm	5.6s

Diesel Engines
Model	Years	Type	Power	Torque	0–100 km/h (0–62 mph)
A6 35 TDI	2019–present	1,968 cc (120.1 cu in) I4 turbo	163 PS (120 kW; 161 bhp) at 3250-4200 rpm	370 N⋅m (273 lb⋅ft) at 1500-3000 rpm	9.3s
A6 40 TDI quattro	2018–present	1,968 cc (120.1 cu in) I4 turbo	204 PS (150 kW; 201 bhp) at 3800-4200 rpm	400 N⋅m (295 lb⋅ft) at 1750-3000 rpm	7.6s
A6 45 TDI quattro	2018–present	2,967 cc (181.1 cu in) V6 turbo	231 PS (170 kW; 228 bhp) at 3250-4750 rpm	500 N⋅m (369 lb⋅ft) at 1750-3250 rpm	6.3s
A6 50 TDI quattro	2018–present	2,967 cc (181.1 cu in) V6 turbo	286 PS (210 kW; 282 bhp) at 3500-4000 rpm	620 N⋅m (457 lb⋅ft) at 2250-3000 rpm	5.5s
S6 3.0 TDI quattro A6 55 TDI quattro (Allroad)	2019–present	2,967 cc (181.1 cu in) V6 turbo	349 PS (257 kW; 344 bhp) at 3850 rpm	700 N⋅m (516 lb⋅ft) at 2500–3100 rpm	5.0s

=== Transmission ===
All variants can come with either a 7-speed S-Tronic DCT or an 8-speed "Tiptronic" automatic.

=== Markets ===
==== North America ====
The 2019 Audi A6 Sedan made its North American debut at the 2018 New York International Auto Show. At that time, Audi had stated that the A6 Avant would not be sold in the United States, however the RS6 Avant was sold from the 2020 model year. The A6 allroad was also sold in the United States and Canada since 2020.

==== Asia ====
- China - The fifth-generation Audi A6L was listed for the Chinese market in January 2019. Engine choices available consist of two turbocharged petrol engines: a 2-litre unit and a 3-litre unit. Both are equipped with a 7-speed dual-clutch gearbox as standard. Trim levels consist of the 40, 50, and 55 trims and are all TFSI models.
- India - The fifth generation of the Audi A6 will be the first generation of the A6 to be assembled and sold in India. It will launch in May 2019.
- Bangladesh - The fifth generation of the Audi A6 will be the first generation of the A6 to be sold in Bangladesh.
- Thailand - The fifth generation of the Audi A6 will be the first generation of the A6 to be sold in Thailand.
- Brunei - The A6 was launched since end of 2019/early 2020 in Brunei with offered its trims: 2.0-litre engine (40 TFSI) and 3.0-litre Quattro engine (55 TFSI).

=== Awards ===
Audi A6 allroad quattro won Auto Bild Allrad's All-Wheel Drive Car of the Year under the Crossover category.

=== Production ===
Following the launch of the new A6, Audi officially stopped production of the A6 and A7 TDI vehicles using V6 TDI Gen2 evo EU6 engines due to an investigation on newly discovered emissions cheating software.

=== Safety ===
ANCAP test results* Audi A6 all variants including S6 (2018, aligned with Euro NCAP)
Test	Points	%
Overall:	5 /5 stars	
Adult occupant:	35.5	93%
Child occupant:	42	85%
Pedestrian:	38	81%
Safety assist:	10.1	78%

Euro NCAP test results* Audi A6 40 TDI Sportline 4x2 (LHD) (2018)
Test	Points	%
Overall:	5 /5 stars	
Adult occupant:	35.5	93%
Child occupant:	41.9	85%
Pedestrian:	38.9	81%
Safety assist:	9.9	76%

== C9 (Typ 4L, 2025) ==
Sixth generation (C9)
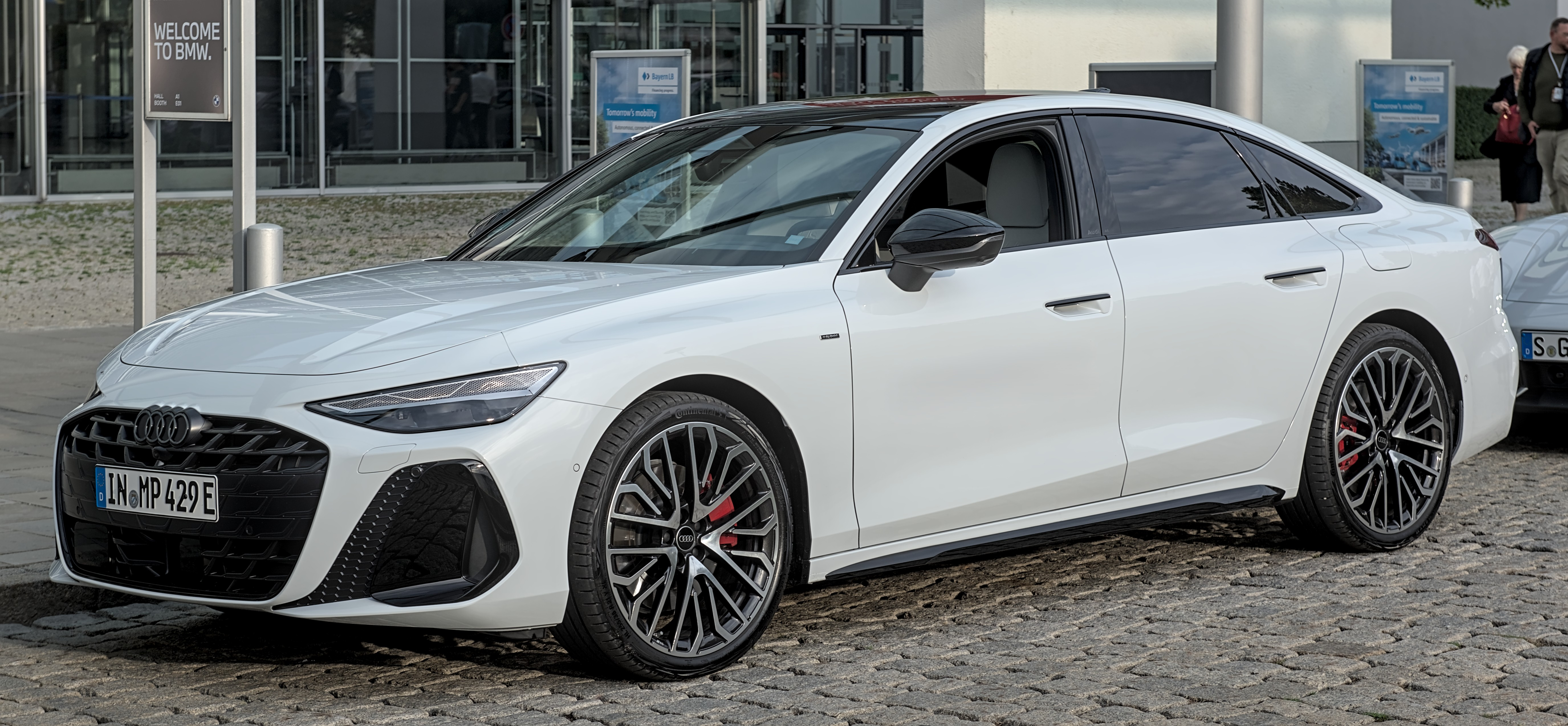

Overview
- Model code: 4L
- Production: April 2025 – present
- Model years: 2026–
- Assembly: Germany: Neckarsulm; China: Changchun (FAW-VW, A6L only)

Body and chassis
- Platform: Premium Platform Combustion (PPC)
- Related: Audi A5 (B10); Audi Q5 Mk3

Powertrain
- Engine: Petrol: 2.0 L EA888 I4 turbo (MHEV Plus); 3.0 L EA839 V6 turbo (MHEV Plus); 4.0 L V8 (Available in RS6); Petrol-PHEV: 2.0 L EA888 I4 turbo (CDL) (e-hybrid); Diesel: 2.0 L EA288 evo I4 turbo; 3.0 L EA897 evo4 V6 turbo (MHEV Plus)
- Electric motor: 48-volt main electrical system (MHEV Plus); Permanent-magnet electric motor (e-hybrid)
- Transmission: 7-speed S tronic dual-clutch automatic
- Hybrid drivetrain: Mild hybrid 48V; PHEV (e-hybrid)

Dimensions
- Wheelbase: 2,923 mm (115.1 in); 3,066 mm (120.7 in) (LWB)
- Length: 4,999 mm (196.8 in); 5,142 mm (202.4 in) (LWB)
- Width: 1,875 mm (73.8 in)
- Height: 1,472 mm (58.0 in); 1,450 mm (57.1 in) (LWB)

In March 2023, Audi CEO Markus Duesmann announced that the A4 would be renamed the A5, while the A6 would become the A7, with the future A4 e‑tron and A6 e‑tron to be sold as electric vehicles only. In February 2025 this renaming was cancelled, therefore the internal combustion engine version is marketed as the sixth-generation A6.

The sixth-generation A6 was officially unveiled on 4 March 2025, firstly as the Avant station wagon model. Orders for the A6 Avant began in March 2025 with deliveries set to commence in late May 2025. The sedan model was unveiled on 15 April 2025, with sales of the sedan model started in the same month.

The new A6 is built on the PPC (Premium Platform Combustion) architecture, which made its debut on the A5 (B10). The platform can also be equipped with all-wheel steering and a Quattro sport differential on Quattro all-wheel drive models. The A6 is also available with the adaptive air suspension and second-generation digital OLED lighting technology. Audi claims the A6 Avant is the most aerodynamic Audi Avant model with a combustion engine with a drag coefficient of 0.25, part of this is because of the large air curtains and controllable air intakes at the front, the design of the roof spoiler, and aerodynamic panels on the sides of the rear window. The A6 Avant is 60 mm (2.4 in) longer than its predecessor.

Audi claims the interior of the A6 offers "a first-class experience". The dashboard features an 11.9-inch digital driver's display, 14.5-inch infotainment touchscreen display, and an optional 10.9-inch front passenger touchscreen display. Other available interior features are a 3D Bang & Olufsen sound system, an adjustable panoramic sunroof, an air quality package includes an ionizer and fine dust sensor, and four-zone automatic climate control. The A6 Avant has a maximum boot space of 1,532 L (54.1 cu ft) when the rear seats folded, which can be folded separately in 40:20:40 format.

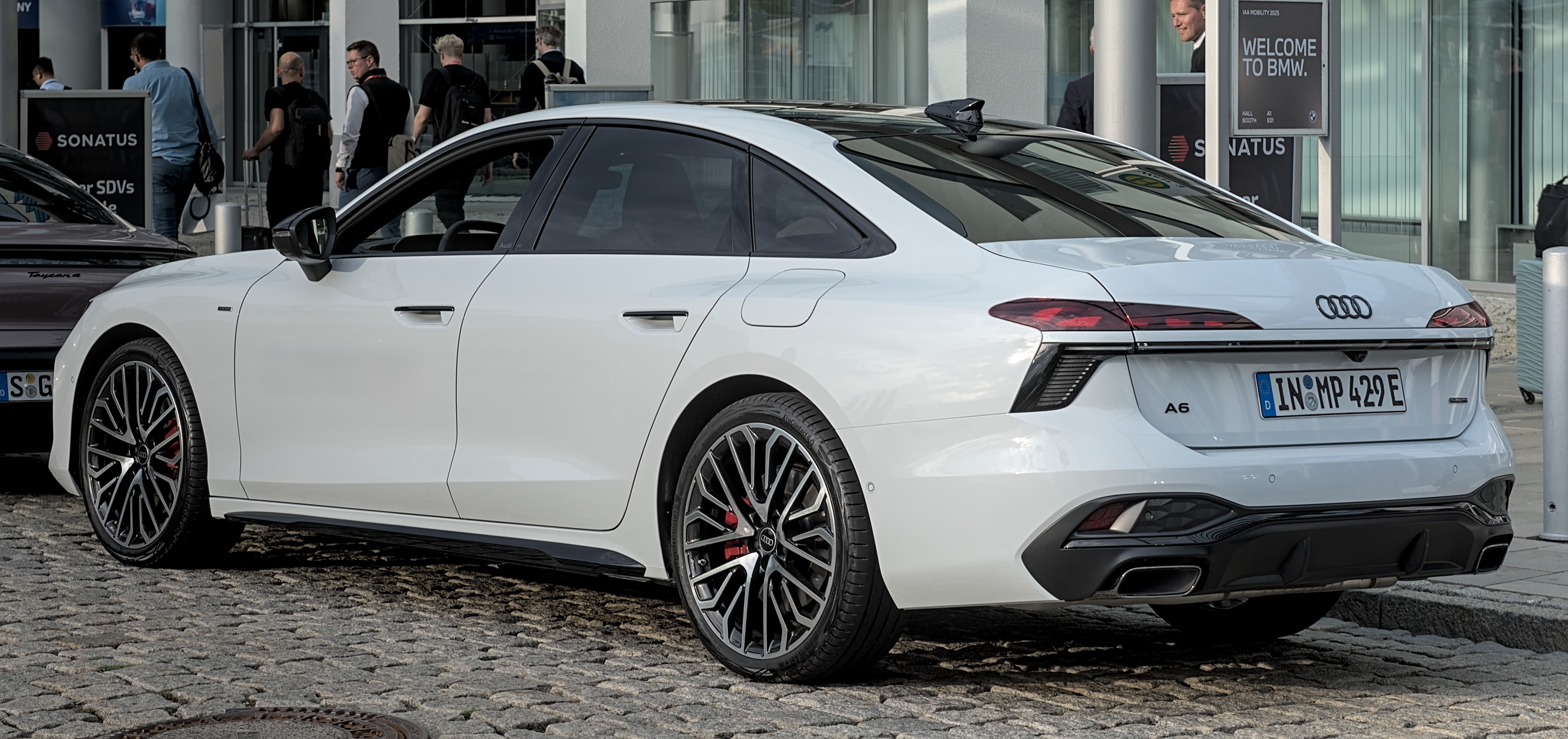
Rear view

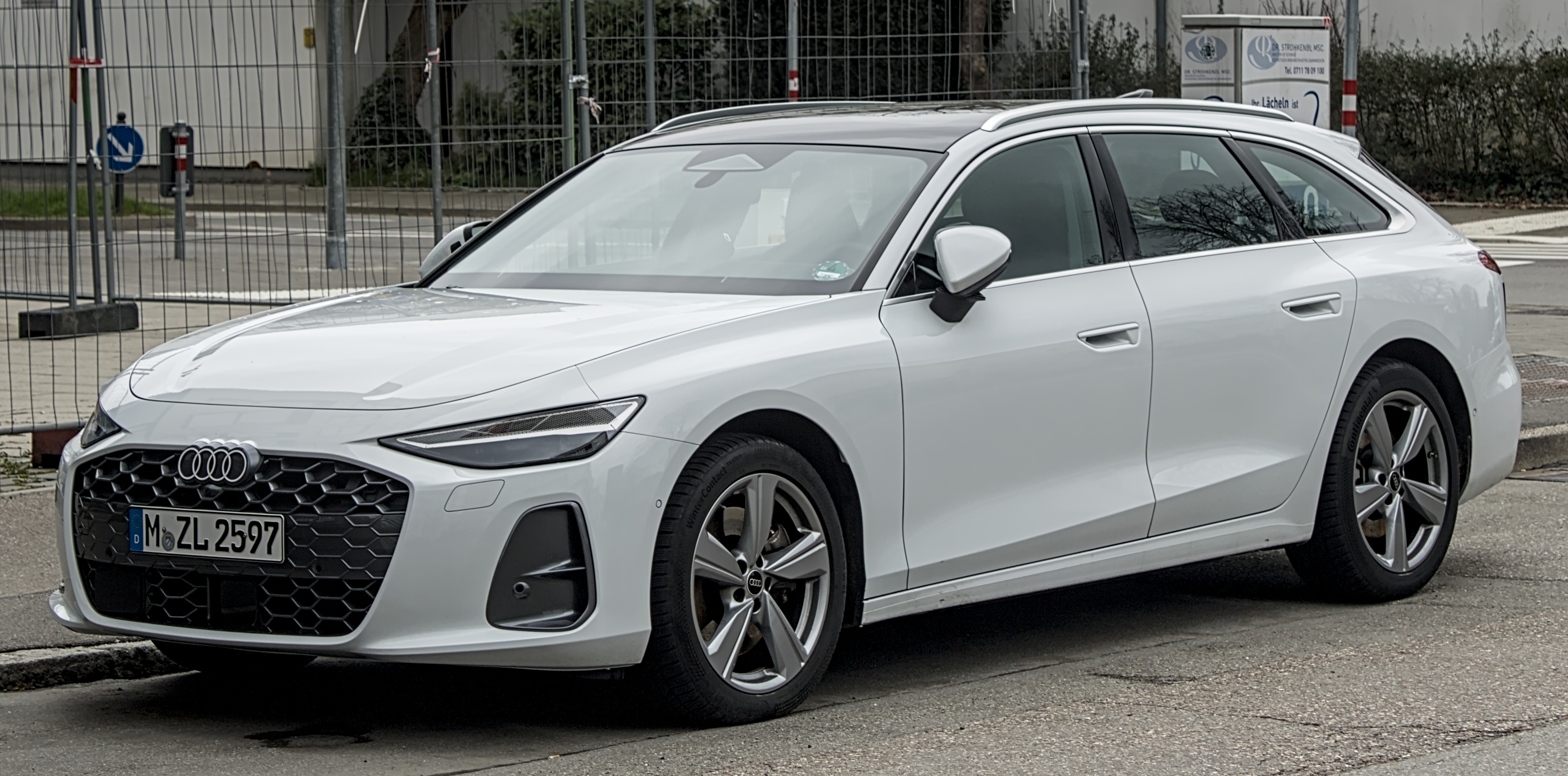
Audi A6 Avant

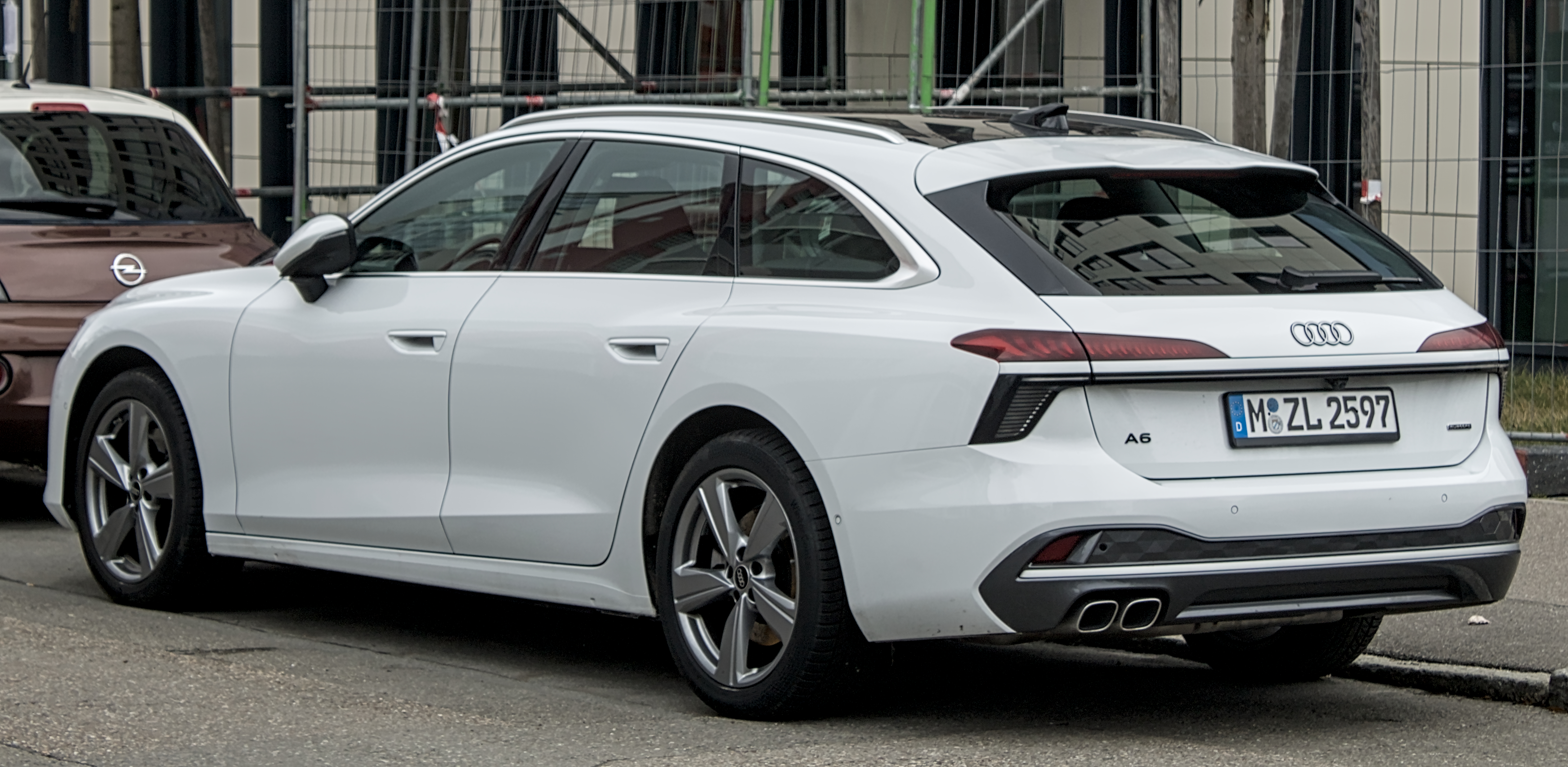
Rear view

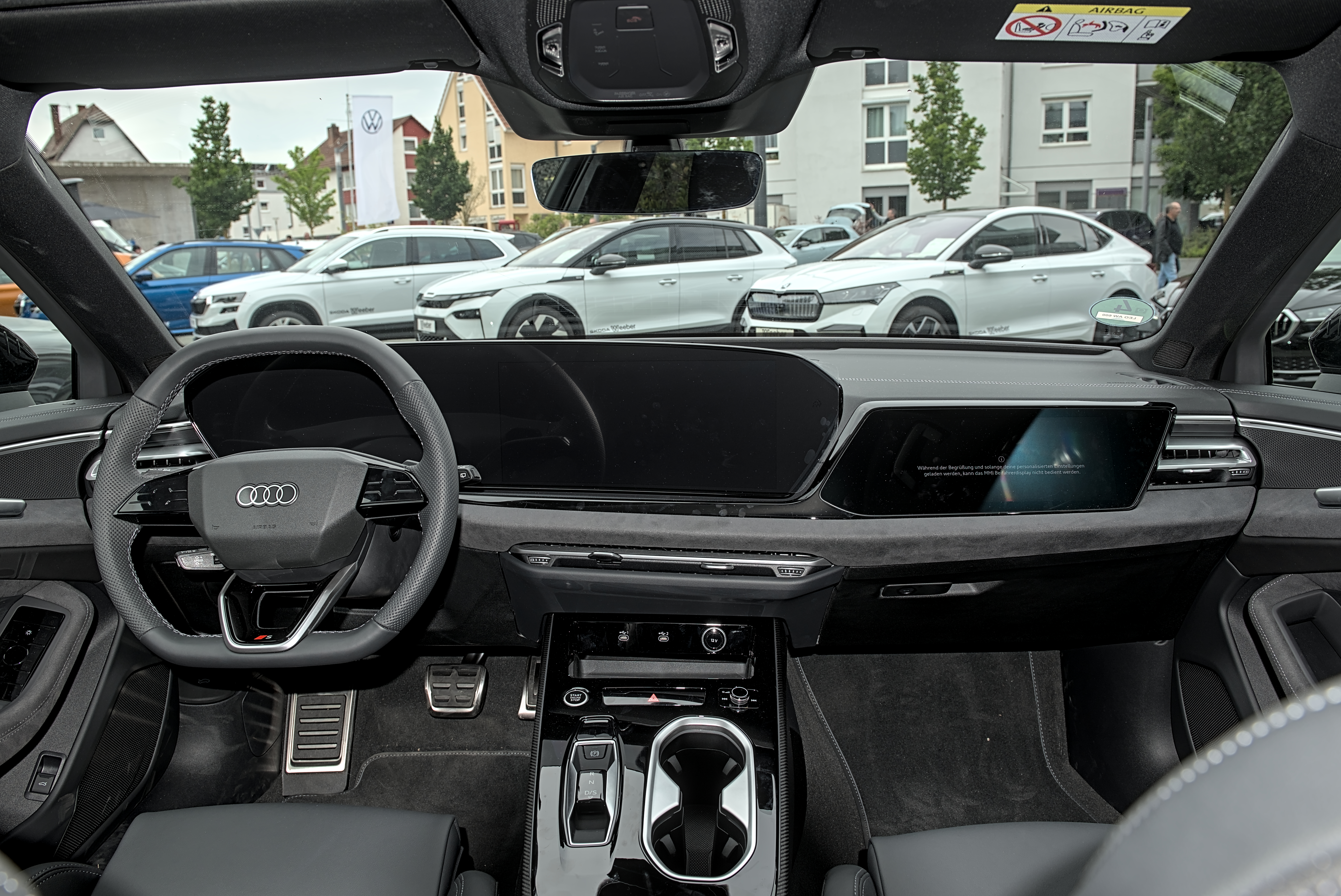
Interior, A6 C9

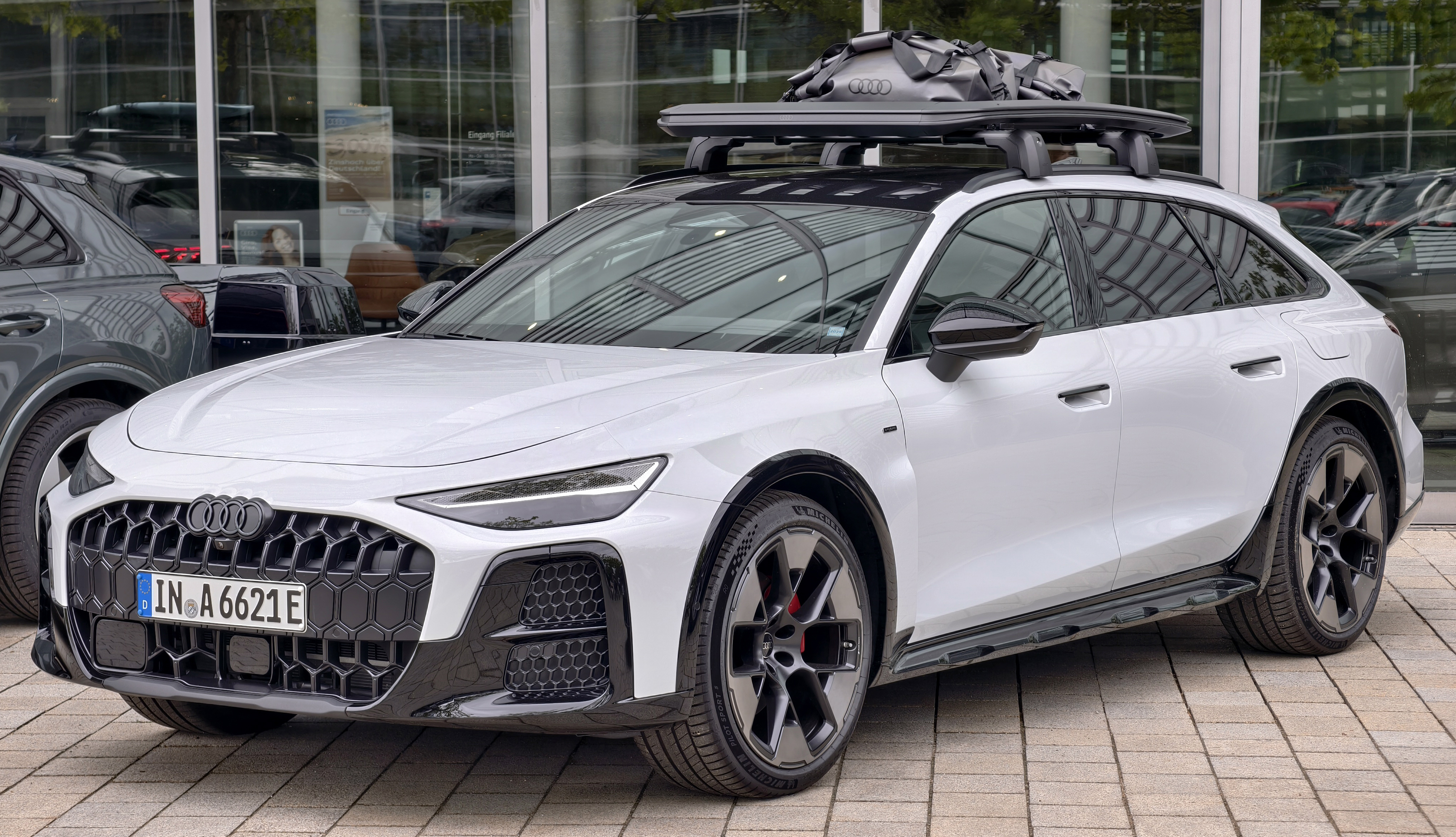
Audi A6 allroad

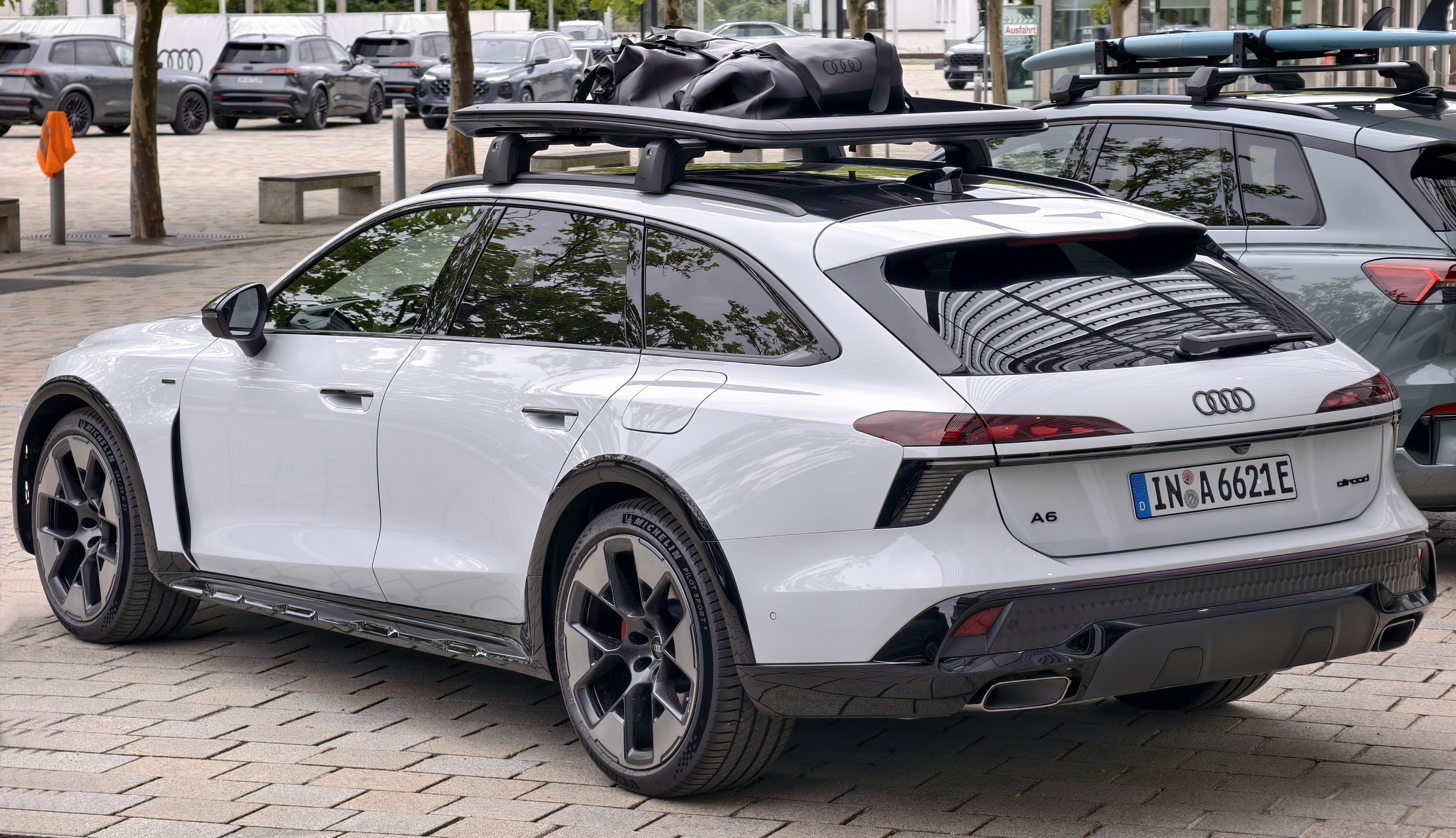
Rear View

=== A6L (2026–) ===
The A6L long-wheelbase model, exclusive to China, was unveiled on 16 January 2026. with preorders opening on 10 March 2026 and went on sale on 25 March 2026.

Audi A6L

Rear view

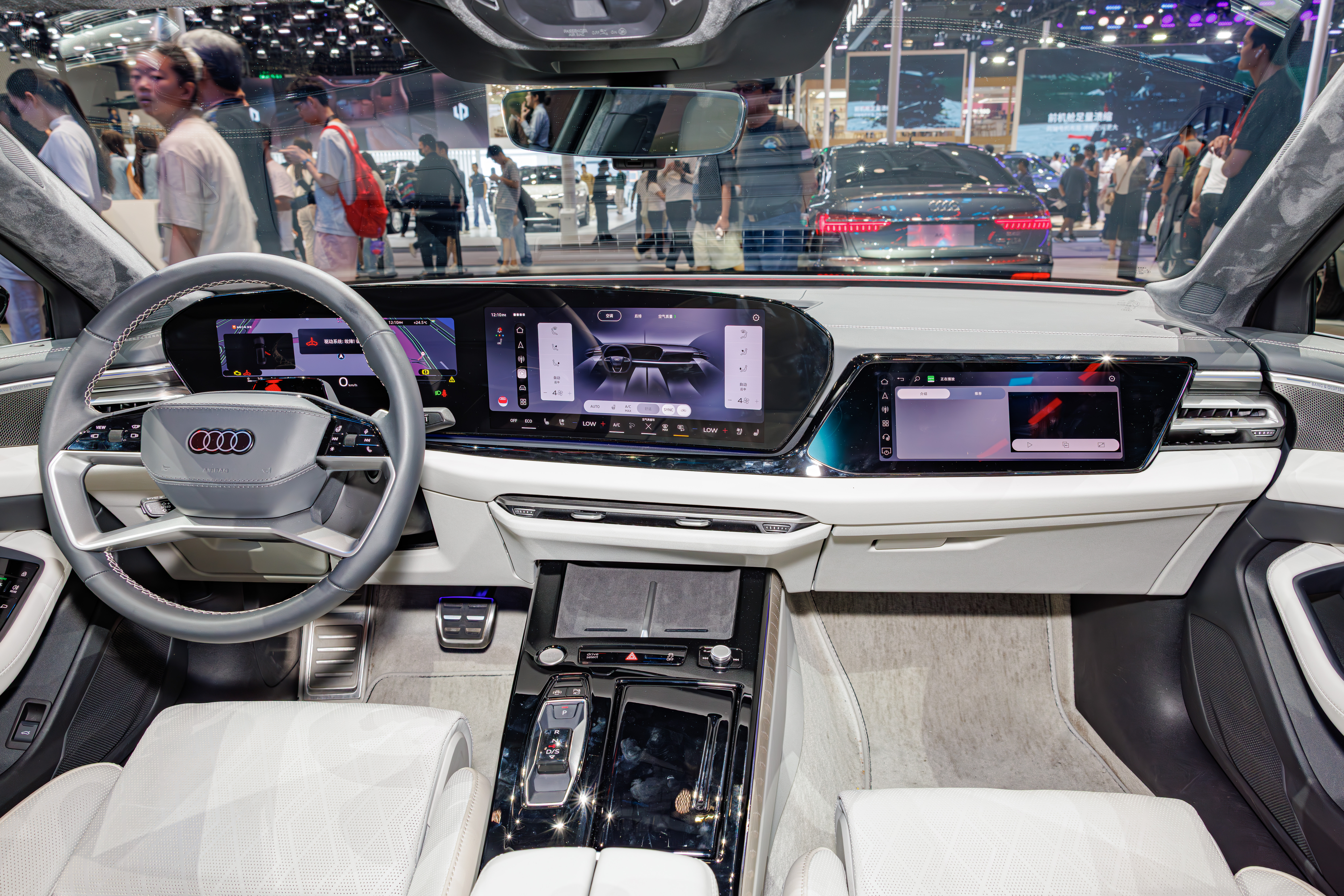
Interior

=== Engines ===
All engines except for the 2.0 TFSI are equipped with the MHEV Plus mild hybrid system includes a 48-volt battery, belt-alternator starter, and an electric motor/generator. At full acceleration, the electric motor can provide an additional 24 PS (18 kW; 24 hp) and 230 N⋅m (170 lb⋅ft) of torque, while also using the braking energy to recharge the small battery. According to Audi, this setup allows the A6 to drive solely on electric power during low-speed maneuvers.

In May 2025, the plug-in hybrid electric vehicle (PHEV) powertrain marketed as the e-hybrid quattro was introduced and it is available two power outputs. The plug-in hybrid powertrain uses the 2.0 TFSI engine from the EA888 series producing 252 PS (185 kW; 249 hp), combined with an electric motor that produces an output of 143 PS (105 kW; 141 hp). The 25.9 kWh lithium-ion battery is positioned above the rear axle, the battery capacity increase by 45% compared to its predecessor, which means the A6 models can drive more than 100 km (62 miles) in electric-only range. The maximum AC charging power of 11 kW and the charging time duration from 0 to 100 percent in just 2.5 hours. The degree of thrust recuperation performance in electric driving mode (EV mode) can be adjusted to three different levels using paddles on the steering wheel and the vehicle automatically recovers energy when this function is activated. Two operating modes are available to the hybrid management system: “EV” and “hybrid.” In EV mode, the plug-in hybrid models run solely on electric power. In hybrid mode, the hybrid management system maintains a specific charge level as needed in order to save enough electrical energy for later use. Combined with the quattro ultra drive and standard all-wheel steering, the electrified dual-clutch transmission increases manoeuvrability at low speeds and provides additional stability at higher speeds.

Petrol engines
Model	Codename	Engine	Power	Torque	Top speed	0–100 km/h (0–62 mph)
Model	Codename	Engine	Power	Torque	Avant	Avant
2.0 TFSI	VW EA888	2.0 L (1,984 cc)	204 PS (150 kW; 201 hp)	340 N⋅m (251 lb⋅ft)	240 km/h (149 mph)	8.3 s
3.0 V6 TFSI	VW EA839 evo	3.0 L (2,995 cc)	367 PS (270 kW; 362 hp)	550 N⋅m (406 lb⋅ft)	250 km/h (155 mph)	4.7 s
Petrol plug-in hybrid engines
2.0 TFSI e quattro	VW EA888	2.0 L (1,984 cc)	367 PS (270 kW; 362 hp)ice: 252 PS (185 kW; 249 hp)	500 N⋅m (369 lb⋅ft)ice: 380 N⋅m (280 ft⋅lb)	250 km/h (155 mph)	4.5–5.1 s
Diesel engines
2.0 TDI	VW EA288 evo	2.0 L (1,968 cc)	204 PS (150 kW; 201 hp)	400 N⋅m (295 lb⋅ft)	241 km/h (150 mph)	7.9 s
2.0 TDI quattro	VW EA288 evo	2.0 L (1,968 cc)	204 PS (150 kW; 201 hp)	400 N⋅m (295 lb⋅ft)	238 km/h (148 mph)	7.0 s
3.0 V6 TDI	VW EA897 evo4	3.0 L (2,967 cc)	299 PS (220 kW; 295 hp)	580 N⋅m (428 ft⋅lb)	250 km/h (155 mph)	5.5 s

=== Safety ===
Euro NCAP test results Audi A5 Avant 2.0 TDI 'Basis' (LHD) (2024)
Test	Points	%
Overall:	5 /5 stars	
Adult occupant:	34.8	87%
Child occupant:	43.2	88%
Pedestrian:	49.6	78%
Safety assist:	14	77%

== Use in China ==
According to Dunne & Company, a research company, as of 2011, purchases in China and Hong Kong make up about half of the 229,200 Audi A6s sold in the world. By 2012 many government officials in China began driving with Audi A6s. After a 1994 campaign from the Chinese government to have officials stop driving Mercedes stretch limousines, the officials began using black Audi A6 cars. Michael Wines of The New York Times wrote that "More than a perk, the black Audi is a rolling advertisement for its occupant’s importance and impunity in a nation obsessed with status."

== Production and sales ==
Production
Year	Total
1994	
1995	
1996	
1997	
1998	
1999	162,573
2000	180,715
2001	162,314
2002	158,775
2003	150,978
2004	180,687
2005	211,142
2006	217,183
2007	227,502
2008	203,791
2009	182,090
2010	211,256
2011	241,862
2012	284,888
2013	288,739
2014	307,693
2015	293,960
2016	276,211
2017	259,618
2018	254,705
2019	232,569
2020	271,679
2021	227,237
2022	208,729
2023	257,111

Sales
Year	China						US
Year	A6	A6L	A6L PHEV	S6	RS6	Total	US
2023	4,086	176,020	2,399	32	121	182,658	8,319
2024	3,542	178,457	—	19	102	182,120	8,519
2025	1,904	162,184	—	39	208	164,335	6,897
