= Mild hybrid =

Automobile with an electric motor that assists the internal combustion engine

A mild hybrid (MHEV, for mild hybrid electric vehicle) is a type of hybrid vehicle that uses a small electric motor and battery to assist an internal combustion engine. For this reason, they are sometimes referred to as power-assist hybrids or Battery Assisted Hybrid electric Vehicle (BAHV). Unlike a traditional full hybrid, the electric motor in an MHEV cannot power the vehicle independently. Instead, it provides supplementary power during acceleration and other periods of high engine load, thereby improving fuel economy. The system typically incorporates regenerative braking, which recovers energy during deceleration and reduces wear on the vehicle’s brakes. The motor is usually configured as an integrated starter generator (ISG), replacing a traditional starter motor, and positioned between the engine and the transmission.

MHEVs can also stop the engine when the vehicle is coasting, braking, or idling, and restart it when power is needed. This function is similar to a start–stop system, but the ISG generally allows for smoother restarts and enables vehicle electrical systems such as climate control to continue full operation while the engine is off. The batteries used in modern mild hybrid systems are typically 48-volt lithium-ion packs, and for this reason they are sometimes referred to as a 48-volt system. Mild hybrid systems are generally less expensive, smaller, and lighter than full hybrid systems, making them easier to integrate without significantly affecting passenger or cargo space. Their fuel-saving benefits are most pronounced in urban, stop-and-go driving conditions.

Some journalists have questioned whether MHEVs should be classified as hybrids or described with the term "electric vehicle," since they cannot operate solely on electric power. Others argue that the emissions reductions provided are minimal, and that the technology may be marketed in a way that amounts to greenwashing.

== Overview ==
Like full hybrid electric vehicles, mild hybrids have an electrical motor, but it is much smaller and only assists with acceleration and regenerative braking, making it slightly more efficient than a pure combustion engine. In other words, the electrical motor functions as a combined starter and alternator. A typical mild-hybrid setup uses a belt-powered generator-motor unit driven off the engine to supply power to a small battery. The generator is also powered through regenerative braking, enabling power that would otherwise be dissipated as heat to be recaptured and recovered for use in powering the vehicle. The small power assist generated by mild-hybrid systems can help supplement the internal combustion engine in low-speed situations or handle the demands of engine start/stop functionality. Vehicles equipped with a mild-hybrid system typically see anywhere from a 0.4 to 1.7 km/l (1.1 to 4.8 mpg_{‑imp}; 0.9 to 4.0 mpg_{‑US}) improvement in fuel economy relative to comparable models without the technology – a saving of 2 to 8 percent.

== Dual mild hybrids ==
These contain two different energy recovery systems.

The Mercedes-Benz C-Class (W206), Mercedes-AMG SL 43 (R232), the Mercedes-AMG CLE 53, the petrol Mercedes C254/X254, and the Porsche 911 Carrera GTS T-Hybrid have an electrically-assisted turbocharger/MGU-H.

== Examples ==
=== General Motors ===
General Motors mild hybrids, including the Parallel Hybrid Truck (PHT) and numerous cars and SUVs equipped with the belt alternator starter (BAS) hybrid system, often use a 36- to 48-volt system to supply the power needed for the startup motor, as well as a source of power to compensate for the increasing number of electronic accessories on modern vehicles. GM's belt alternator starter (BAS) mild hybrid system uses a belt drive to start the internal combustion engine (ICE) through its motor–generator unit (MGU); then once started, the engine drives the 14.5 kW motor-generator to charge the batteries. The BAS hybrid system also utilizes regenerative braking to replenish the system's 36 V battery and can provide moderate levels of power assist. According to the EPA, a 2009 Saturn Vue Greenline equipped with the BAS hybrid system delivers a 27% improvement in combined fuel economy over the non-hybrid version (FWD 4cyl).

=== Others ===
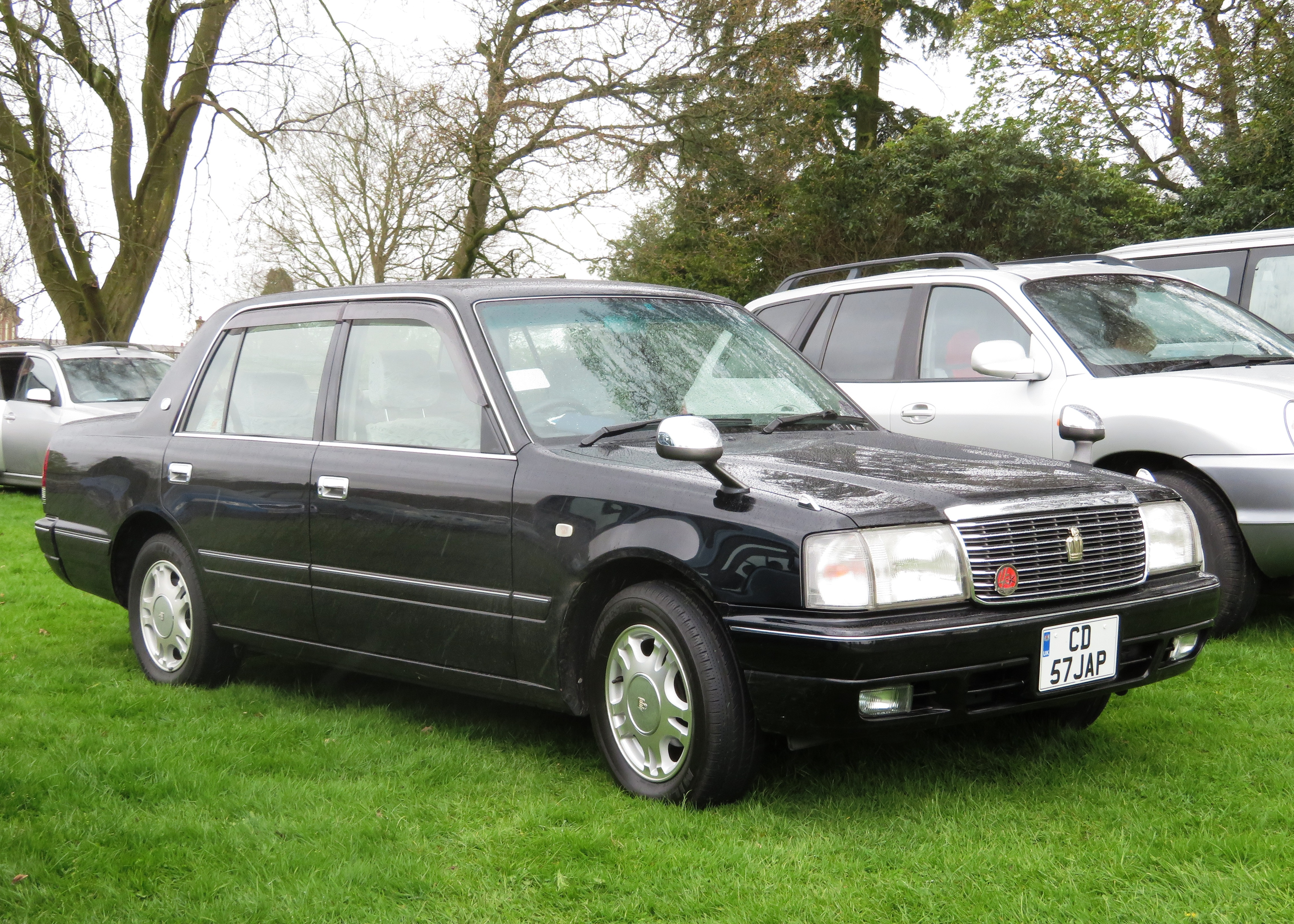
Toyota Crown Sedan Super Deluxe Mild Hybrid

During the 2008 Olympic Games in Beijing in August, Chinese automobile manufacturer Chang'an Motors supplied a number of hybrid-drive cars as taxis for the athletes and spectators. The power electronics for the "mild hybrid" drive was supplied by Infineon.

Toyota sold mild hybrid versions of the Toyota Crown executive sedan between 2001 and 2003 and the mid-size Crown Sedan between 2002 and 2008 in the Japanese domestic market.

MINI and BMW have start and stop, and some with regenerative braking, in all of their vehicles sold in Europe running 4-cylinder engines with manual transmissions.

Citroën proposes a stop and start system on its C2 and C3 models. The concept-car C5 Airscape has an improved version of that, adding regenerative braking and traction assistance functionalities, and ultracapacitors for energy buffering.

In 2004 VW brought two mild hybrid concept cars to Shanghai for the Challenge Bibendum.

Most hybrids use gasoline engines, but some use diesel engines, such as the Hyundai 1.6. In 2021 Land Rover started selling the Range Rover Sport D350, which runs on the 3.0-litre D300 Ingenium diesel engine.

The Genesis G90 and Genesis GV80 Coupe offer mild hybrid options with an electric supercharger.

== See also ==
- Integrated Motor Assist
- Micro HEV
