= Mercedes-Benz M139 engine =

Mercedes-Benz M139
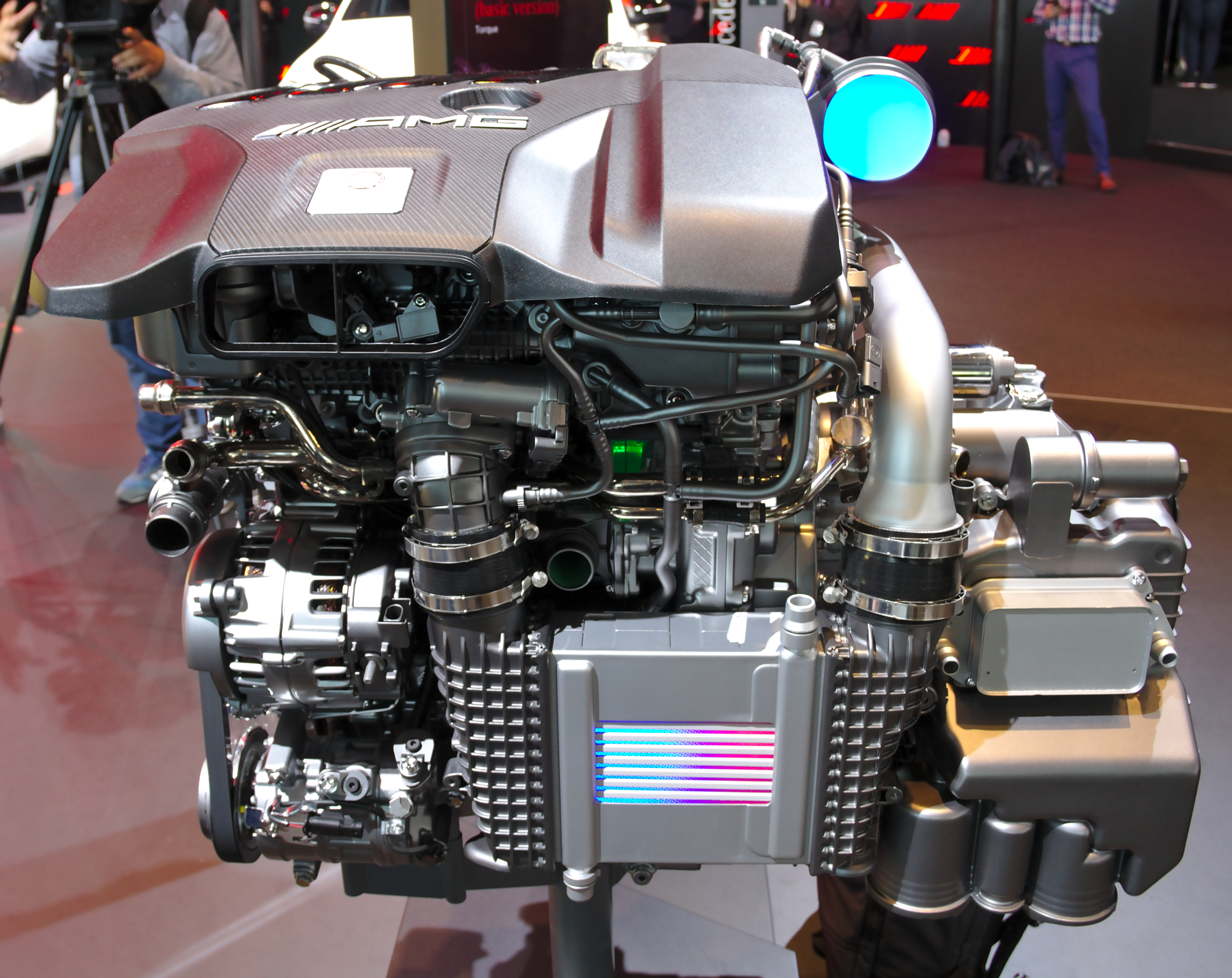

Overview
- Manufacturer: Mercedes-AMG
- Production: 2019-present

Layout
- Configuration: Straight-four engine
- Displacement: 2.0 L (1,991 cc)
- Cylinder bore: 83 mm (3.27 in)
- Piston stroke: 92 mm (3.62 in)
- Cylinder block material: Aluminium alloy
- Cylinder head material: Aluminium alloy
- Valvetrain: DOHC
- Compression ratio: 9.0:1

Combustion
- Turbocharger: One twin-scroll, electrically assisted
- Fuel system: Combined Direct and Port Fuel Injection
- Fuel type: Gasoline

Output
- Power output: 285 kW (387 PS; 382 hp) base version 310 kW (421 PS; 416 hp) S-model
- Torque output: 480 N⋅m (354 lb⋅ft) (base version) 500 N⋅m (369 lb⋅ft) (S-model)

Dimensions
- Dry weight: 160.5 kg (354 lb)

Chronology
- Predecessor: Mercedes-Benz M133 engine

The M139 is a turbocharged straight-four engine produced by Mercedes-Benz. It serves as the successor to the M133 engine. It is the first AMG four-cylinder engine to feature two distinct output levels, be assembled by hand under the "one man, one engine" philosophy, and utilize a combined port and direct fuel injection system. At 310 kW (416 hp), upon its introduction, the M139 was the world's most powerful four-cylinder engine in serial production, achieving a specific output of 155 kW (208 hp) per litre or 78 kW (104 hp) per cylinder. The current top version of the M139 produces 350 kW (469 hp), giving it a specific output of 175 kW (235 hp) per litre or 87.5 kW (117 hp) per cylinder, maintaining its status as the most powerful four-cylinder engine in serial production.

== Design ==
The M139 engine is based on the current M260 engine, an upgraded version of the outgoing M270, sharing the same bore, stroke, and block design. Unlike the standard M260, AMG engineers rotated the engine block 180 degrees. This orientation places the intake system at the front of the engine, while the turbocharger and exhaust headers are located between the engine and the firewall. This rotation is intended to optimize engine airflow for enhanced performance with shorter paths and fewer diversions. Mercedes-AMG states that this also "allows the flattest possible and aerodynamically advantageous front section design." The exhaust valves in the M139 engine are larger than those in the M133 engine to facilitate higher flow. The compression ratio for the M139 is raised to 9.0:1, compared to 8.6:1 for the M133. The two-stage fuel injection system, a first for an AMG four-cylinder engine, employs piezo injectors for direct injection into the combustion chambers as the primary stage, and solenoid valves in the manifolds as the secondary stage to increase specific output.

It uses an electrically assisted turbocharger system supplied by Garrett Motion.

== Performance ==
The M139 engine is available in two main output variants: 285 kW (387 PS; 382 hp) and 480 N⋅m (354 lb⋅ft) for the base version, and 310 kW (421 PS; 416 hp) and 500 N⋅m (369 lb⋅ft) for the S-model.

== Models ==
Engine	Power	Torque	Years
M139	285 kW (382 hp) at 6,500 rpm	480 N⋅m (354 lb⋅ft) at 4,750-5,000 rpm	2019-
M139	300 kW (402 hp)	500 N⋅m (369 lb⋅ft)	2022-
M139	310 kW (416 hp) at 6,750 rpm	500 N⋅m (369 lb⋅ft) at 5,000-5,250 rpm	2019-
M139I	350 kW (469 hp) at 6,750 rpm	545 N⋅m (402 lb⋅ft) at 5,250-5,500 rpm	2023-

=== M139 (285 kW version) ===
- 2019 - Mercedes-AMG CLA 45 4MATIC+ (Not available in United States until 2025 model year) (C118)
- 2019 - Mercedes-AMG A 45 4MATIC+ (W177)
- 2020 - Mercedes-AMG GLA 45 4MATIC+ (H247)
- 2024 - Mercedes-AMG SL 43 (R232)
- 2022 - Lotus Emira (268 kW / 360 hp)

=== M139 (300 kW version) ===
- 2022 - Mercedes-AMG C 43 4MATIC (W206)
- 2024 - Lotus Emira (US & China), Turbo SE (ROW)

=== M139 (310 kW version) ===
- 2019 - Mercedes-AMG CLA 45 S 4MATIC+ (Not available in United States until 2025 model year) (C118)
- 2019 - Mercedes-AMG A 45 S 4MATIC+ (W177)
- 2020 - Mercedes-AMG GLA 45 S 4MATIC+ (H247)
- 2024 - Mercedes-AMG C 43 4MATIC (W206)
- 2024 - Mercedes-AMG GLC 43 4MATIC (X254/C254)
- 2024 - Mercedes-AMG GT 43 (C192)
- 2025 - Mercedes-AMG SL 43 (R232)
- 2024 - Lotus Emira 420 Sport

=== M139I (350 kW version) ===
- 2022 - Mercedes-AMG C 63 S E Performance 4MATIC+ (W206)
- 2024 - Mercedes-AMG GLC 63 S E Performance 4MATIC+ (X254/C254)
