= Mercedes-Benz M133 engine =

Mercedes-Benz M133
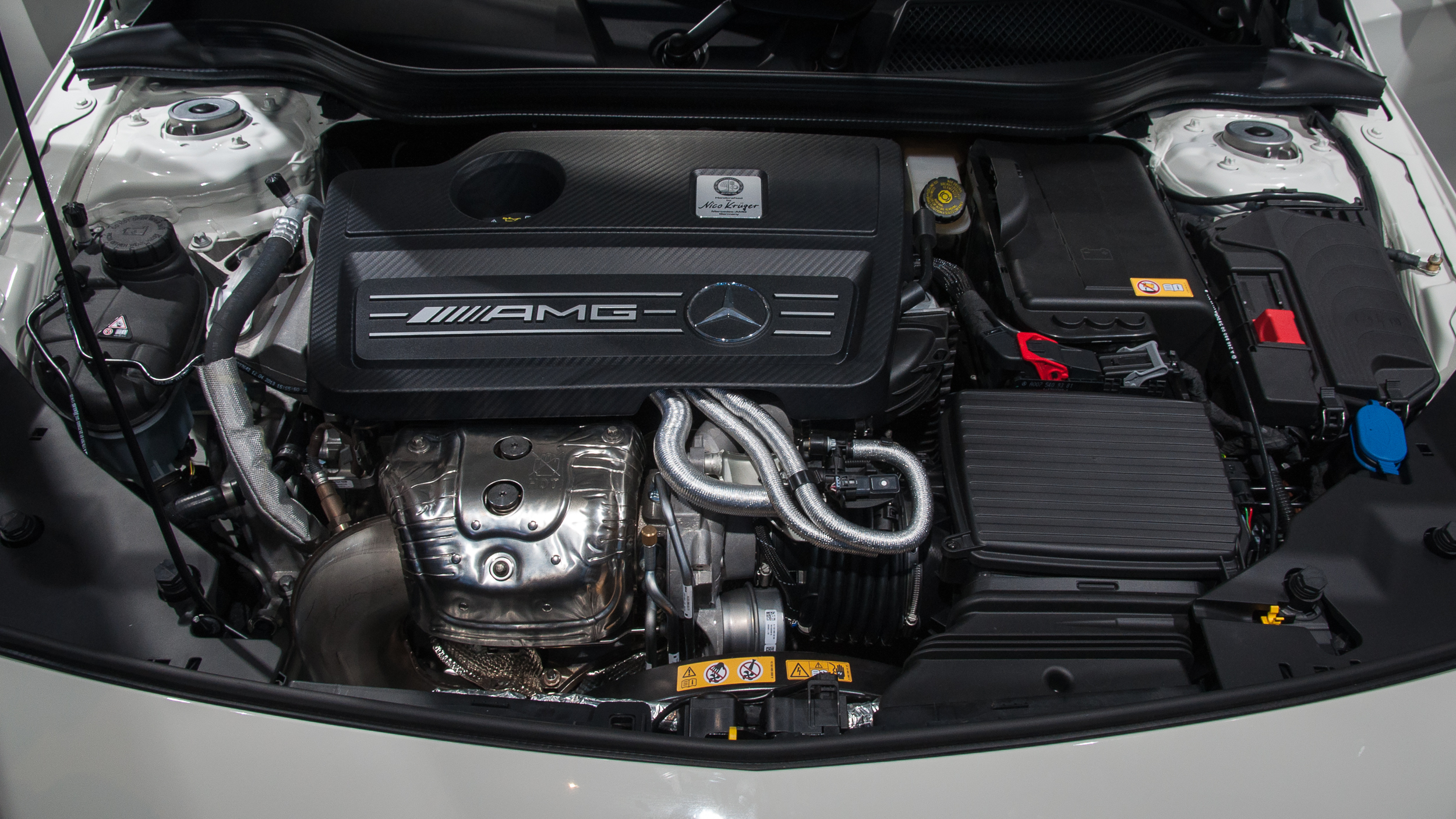

Overview
- Manufacturer: Mercedes-AMG
- Production: 2013–2019

Layout
- Configuration: Inline-four engine
- Displacement: 2.0 L (1,991 cc)
- Cylinder bore: 83 mm (3.27 in)
- Piston stroke: 92 mm (3.62 in)
- Cylinder block material: Aluminium alloy
- Cylinder head material: Aluminium alloy
- Valvetrain: DOHC
- Compression ratio: 8.6:1

Combustion
- Turbocharger: Single twin-scroll
- Fuel system: Direct injection
- Fuel type: Gasoline

Output
- Power output: 265–280 kW (360–381 PS; 355–375 hp)
- Torque output: 450–475 N⋅m (332–350 lb⋅ft)

Dimensions
- Dry weight: 147.8 kg (326 lb)

Chronology
- Successor: Mercedes-Benz M139 engine

The M133 is a turbocharged inline-four engine produced by Mercedes-Benz. Since its debut in 2013, it has been awarded International Engine of the Year three times in the "Best New Engine" and "1.8-litre to 2-litre" categories.

== Design ==
The M133 is based on the M270 engine but has been extensively revised by AMG. It features a twin-scroll turbocharger, BlueDIRECT direct injection, iron-carbon alloy on the cylinder walls to reduce friction, and zircon in the cylinder heads to increase thermal conductivity. The cooling system is also based on the one found in the Mercedes-Benz SLS AMG. The M133 was updated in 2015, and features performance improvements of 15 kW (20 PS; 20 hp) and 25 N⋅m (18 lb⋅ft).

== Models ==
| Engine | Power | Torque | Years |
|---|---|---|---|
| M133 DE20 LA | 265 kW (360 PS; 355 hp) at 6,000 rpm | 450 N⋅m (332 lb⋅ft) at 2,250–5,000 rpm | 2013–2015 |
| M133 DE20 LA | 280 kW (381 PS; 375 hp) at 6,000 rpm | 475 N⋅m (350 lb⋅ft) at 2,250–5,000 rpm | 2015–2018 |

=== M133 DE20 LA (265 kW version) ===
- 2013–2015 C117 CLA45 AMG
- 2013–2015 W176 A45 AMG
- 2014–2015 X156 GLA45 AMG

=== M133 DE20 LA (280 kW version) ===
- 2015–2018 C117 CLA45 AMG
- 2015–2018 W176 A45 AMG
- 2015–2019 X156 GLA45 AMG
