= Electrically assisted turbocharger =

Turbocharger system

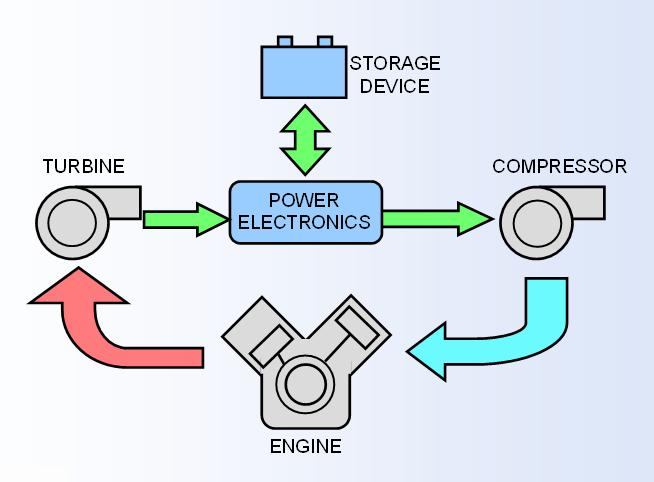
Schematic of an example EAT system (Aeristech)

An electrically assisted turbocharger (EAT) is an arrangement where an electric motor assists the gas-driven turbocharger in providing forced induction, particular at times when exhaust gas flow is insufficient to produce the desired boost. Some systems integrate the motor inside a turbocharger, while others use a separate electric supercharger.

== Systems ==
=== BorgWarner ===
BorgWarner tested the idea in the 1990s, but never produced a part for production vehicles because of high power consumption, until the Mercedes-Benz M256 engine (2017), which used a 48-volt electrical system.

As of January 2023, BorgWarner markets two EAT solutions: a standalone "electric compressor" (i.e. supercharger) named eBooster and a turbocharger with a single-shaft motor attached named eTurbo.

=== Garrett Motion ===
In October 2019, Garrett Motion announced its first electric turbocharger for market passenger vehicles, with expected launch in 2021. The design adds an electric motor between the turbocharger's turbine wheel and compressor wheel.

The 2023 Mercedes-AMG SL 43 convertible uses the Mercedes-Benz M139 engine, which features the integrated Garrett Motion EAT.

=== Volkswagen TDI ===
The TDI line used by the Audi brand has seen 4.0 V8 TDI 310-320kW, used on the Audi SQ7 and more. It has 2 turbochargers and 1 electric supercharger.

=== Volvo ===
In 2010, Volvo started to experiment with electrically assisted turbochargers. The result was unveiled in 2014, a 450hp 2.0L High Performance Drive-E Powertrain Concept engine, which used a 48-volt electrical system for the electric booster. The engine has three turbos, with the electric "turbo" driving the exhaust turbines of the twin-turbo. Despite initial reports that the Volvo XC90 T6 would have a related improvement, only the 2016 Volvo XC90 T8 actually received a Twin Engine starter-generator-supercharger in addition to the mechanical twincharger arrangement.

In 2019, Volvo reiterated plans to replace the mechanical supercharger with an electric one.

=== Porsche ===
In May 2024, the German auto manufacturer Porsche revealed a new version of the Porsche 911 GTS, which used a 3.6 L flat-six engine coupled with an electric turbocharger, dubbed the eTurbo. The 1.9 kWh battery generates 11 kW of electrical power, and is situated directly between the turbine wheel and the engine's compressor. The electric motor working with the transmission allows the turbocharger to spool up almost instantly, and boost pressure builds within a very short time while simultaneously reducing turbo lag. Torque, while not instant like in fully electric vehicles, is produced at a much lower RPM in comparison to the 911's gas powered models.

Emissions produced by the eTurbo are significantly lower than the petrol models of the 911. In addition, power produced is significantly higher, and according to Porsche, a single electrically assisted turbocharger was sufficient. Moreover, the eight-speed PDK (see dual-clutch transmission) used was re-engineered to accommodate for the significant increase in torque due to the electric motor.

=== Abandoned ===
In the late 1990s, Turbodyne also investigated EAT designs.

== Related devices ==
An electric supercharger also uses an electric motor to power the compressor, however the electric motor is the sole power source in an electric supercharger.

A turbocharger that can divert some of the exhaust gas to produce electricity (using the vehicle's alternator) is sometimes called a hybrid turbocharger.

Hybrid turbo can also refer to an aftermarket modification that puts upgraded internals in an existing housing.

== See also ==
- MGU-H
- MGU-K
