= Mercedes-Benz C-Class (W206) =

Fifth generation of Mercedes-Benz C-Class

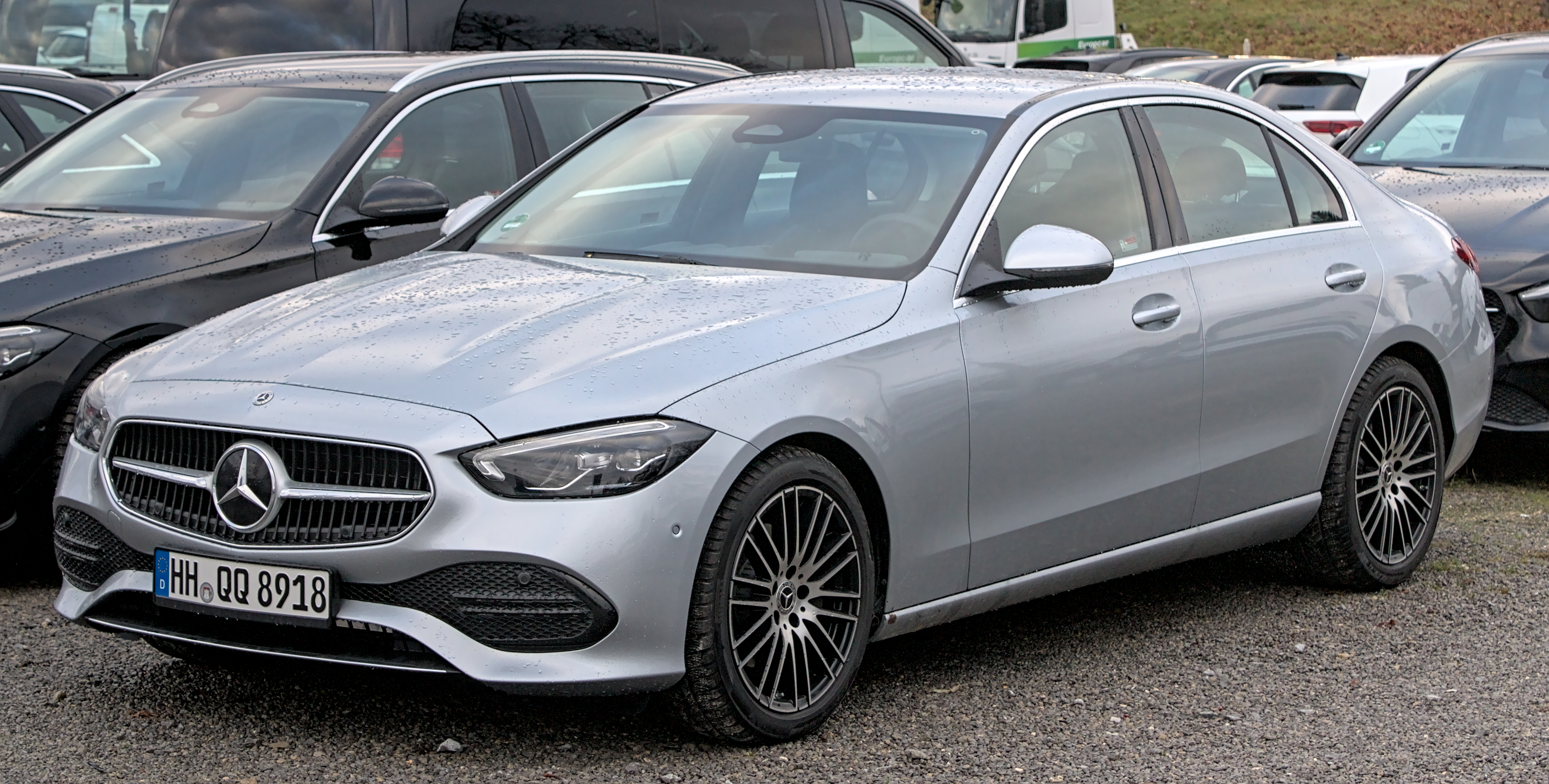
- Mercedes-Benz C 220d sedan

Overview
- Manufacturer: Daimler AG (2021–2022); Mercedes-Benz Group (2022–present)
- Model code: W206 (sedan); S206 (station wagon / estate); V206 (long-wheelbase sedan); X206 (All-Terrain)
- Production: March 2021–present
- Model years: 2022–present
- Assembly: Germany: Bremen; South Africa: East London; China: Beijing (Beijing Benz: V206 LWB sedan); India: Pune (MBI); Thailand: Samut Prakan (TAAP); Malaysia: Pekan (HICOM); Indonesia: Bogor (MBDI / Inchcape Indomobil)
- Designer: Balázs Filczer under Gorden Wagener

Body and chassis
- Class: Compact executive car (D)
- Body style: 4-door sedan 5-door estate
- Layout: Front-engine, rear-wheel-drive or all-wheel-drive (4Matic)
- Platform: MRA2
- Related: Mercedes-Benz GLC (X254); Mercedes-Benz CLE (C236/A236)

Powertrain
- Engine: Petrol: 1.5 L M264 mild hybrid turbo (EQ Boost) I4; 2.0 L M264 mild hybrid turbo (EQ Boost) I4; 2.0 L M139 mild hybrid E-Turbo I4 (EQ Boost; C43); Petrol plug-in hybrid: 2.0 L M264 PHEV turbo I4 (C300e); 2.0 L M254 PHEV turbo I4 (C350e); 2.0L M139L turbo I4 e-Performance PHEV (C63S E Performance); Diesel: 2.0 L OM654 mild hybrid turbo (EQ Boost) I4
- Power output: 135 kW (184 PS; 181 hp) (C200d); 167 kW (227 PS; 224 hp) (C180 / 200L); 162 kW (220 PS; 217 hp) (C220d); 150 kW (204 PS; 201 hp) (C200 / 260L / 200 4Matic / C300e; Engine only); 207 kW (281 PS; 278 hp) (C300); 205 kW (279 PS; 275 hp) (C300d); 245 kW (333 PS; 329 hp) (C300e / C350e; Combined); 320 kW (435 PS; 429 hp) (AMG C43); 350 kW (476 PS; 469 hp) (AMG C63 S E-Performance; Engine only); 500 kW (680 PS; 671 hp) (AMG C63 S E-Performance; Combined)
- Transmission: 9-speed 9G-Tronic automatic
- Hybrid drivetrain: Mild hybrid (EQ Boost); Plug-in hybrid (C300e, C63 S AMG E-Performance)
- Battery: 25.4 kWh lithium-ion; 6.1 kWh lithium ion (C63 S AMG E-Performance)

Dimensions
- Wheelbase: 2,865 mm (112.8 in) (sedan/estate); 2,950 mm (116.1 in) (V206 LWB sedan)
- Length: 4,751 mm (187.0 in); 4,880 mm (192.1 in) (V206 LWB sedan)
- Width: 1,820 mm (71.7 in)
- Height: 1,438 mm (56.6 in) (sedan); 1,455 mm (57.3 in) (estate)

Chronology
- Predecessor: Mercedes-Benz C-Class (W205)

The Mercedes-Benz C-Class (W206) is the fifth generation of the Mercedes-Benz C-Class which is produced by Mercedes-Benz Group AG since 2021. It replaces the W205 C-Class which had been produced since 2014. The fifth-generation C-Class is available in sedan (W206), station wagon/estate (S206), and long-wheelbase sedan (V206) body styles. The W206 C-Class is based on the Mercedes MRA II rear-wheel drive modular platform also used by the W223 S-Class.

== Design ==
All W206 C-Class models are equipped with four-cylinder engines that have an integrated starter generator (15 kW electric motor) and a 48-volt electrical system.

The W206 has independent front and rear suspension. The front axle is a four-link axle, the rear axle is a multi-link axle. Rear axle steering with a steering angle of 2.5 degrees is available as a factory option; the turning circle is reduced by 0.4 m to 10.6 m with the rear axle steering option. The interior styling is related to the S-Class (W223). The C-Class also has a central LCD with a screen diagonal of either 9 in (230 mm) or 11.9 in (300 mm).

The C-Class All-Terrain was released as the crossover-styled estate model. Bearing the X206 codename, it received external body cladding, a 40 mm increase in ride height, 4Matic AWD and additional drive modes.

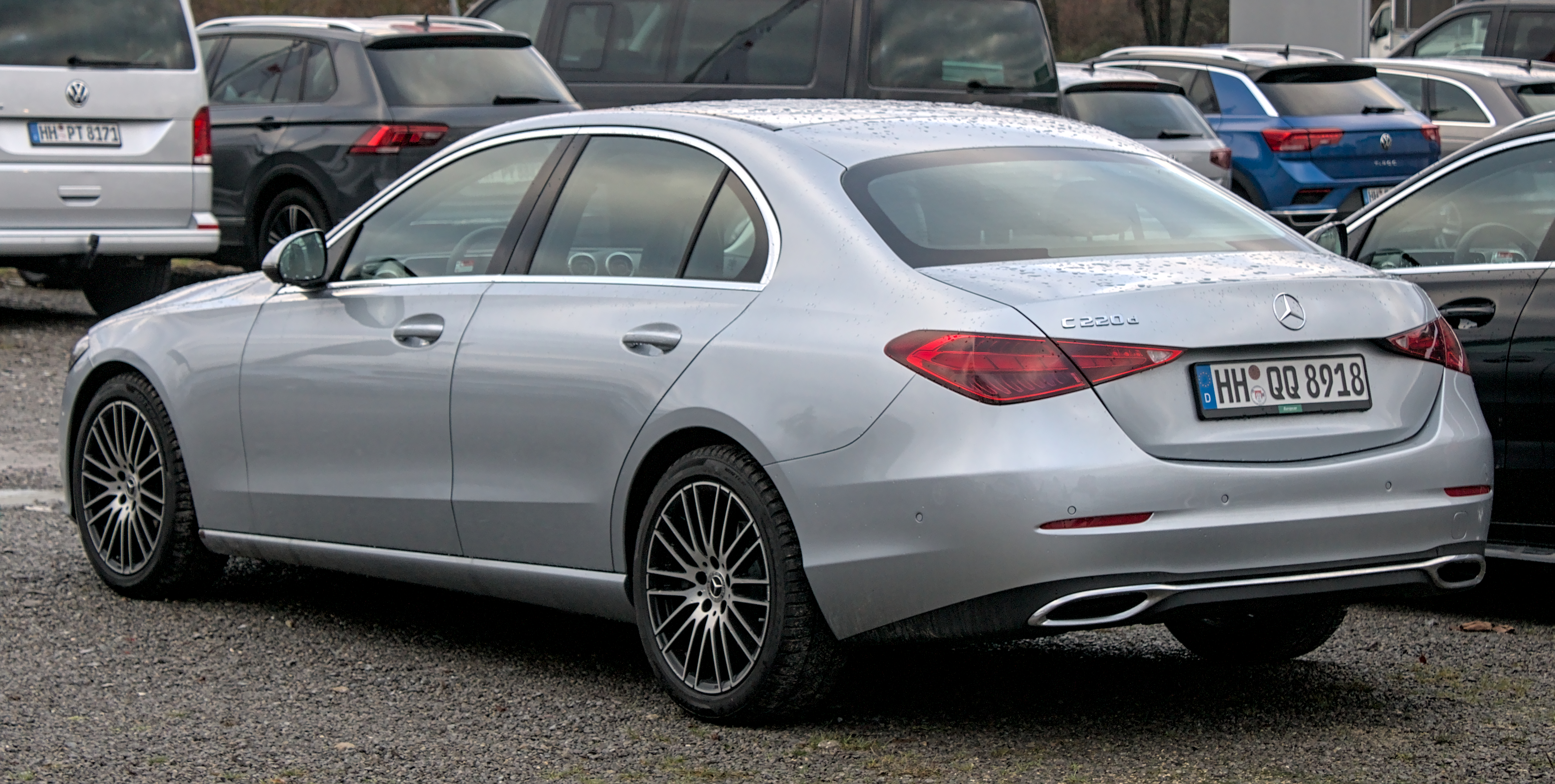
Mercedes-Benz C-Class sedan

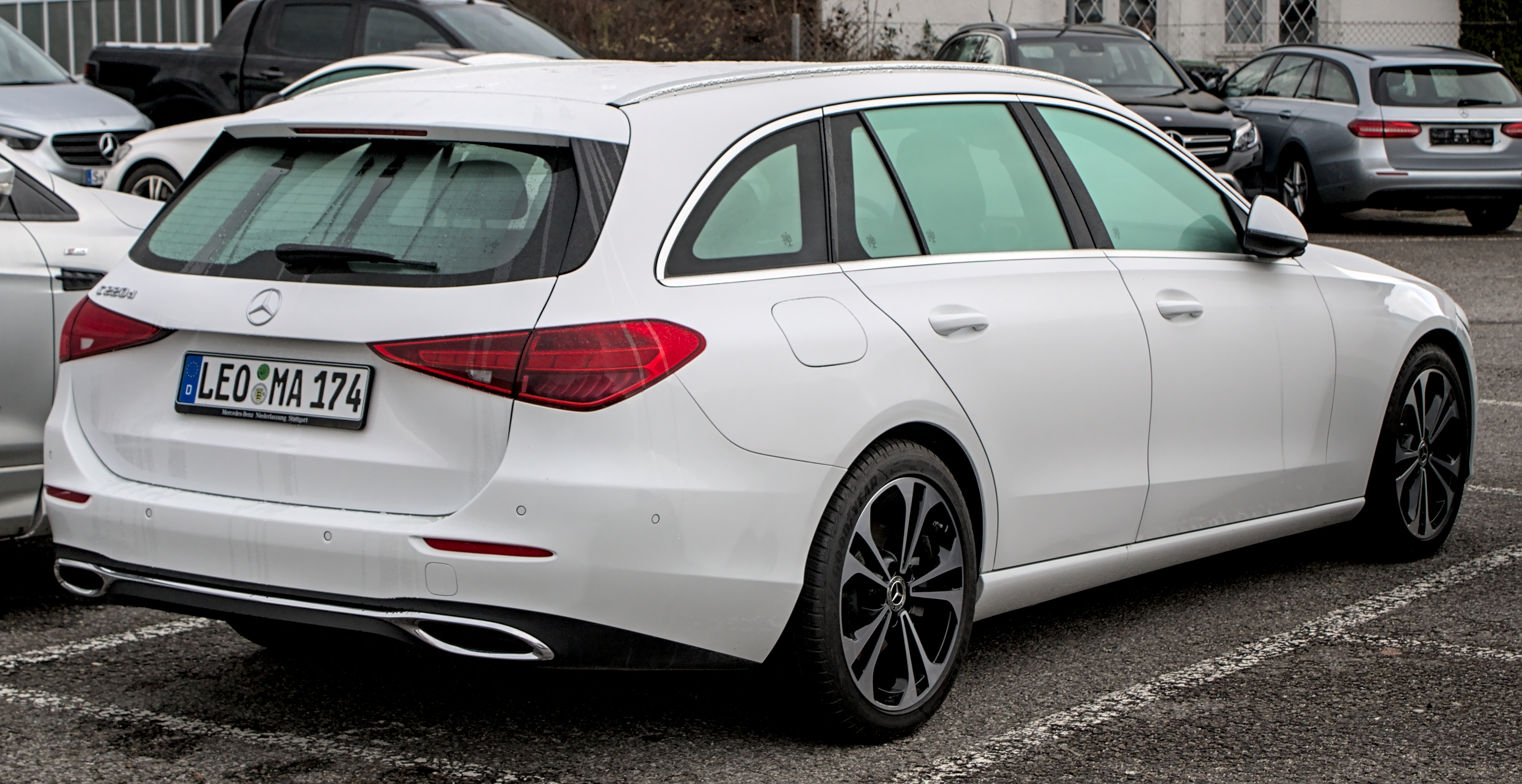
Mercedes-Benz C-Class estate

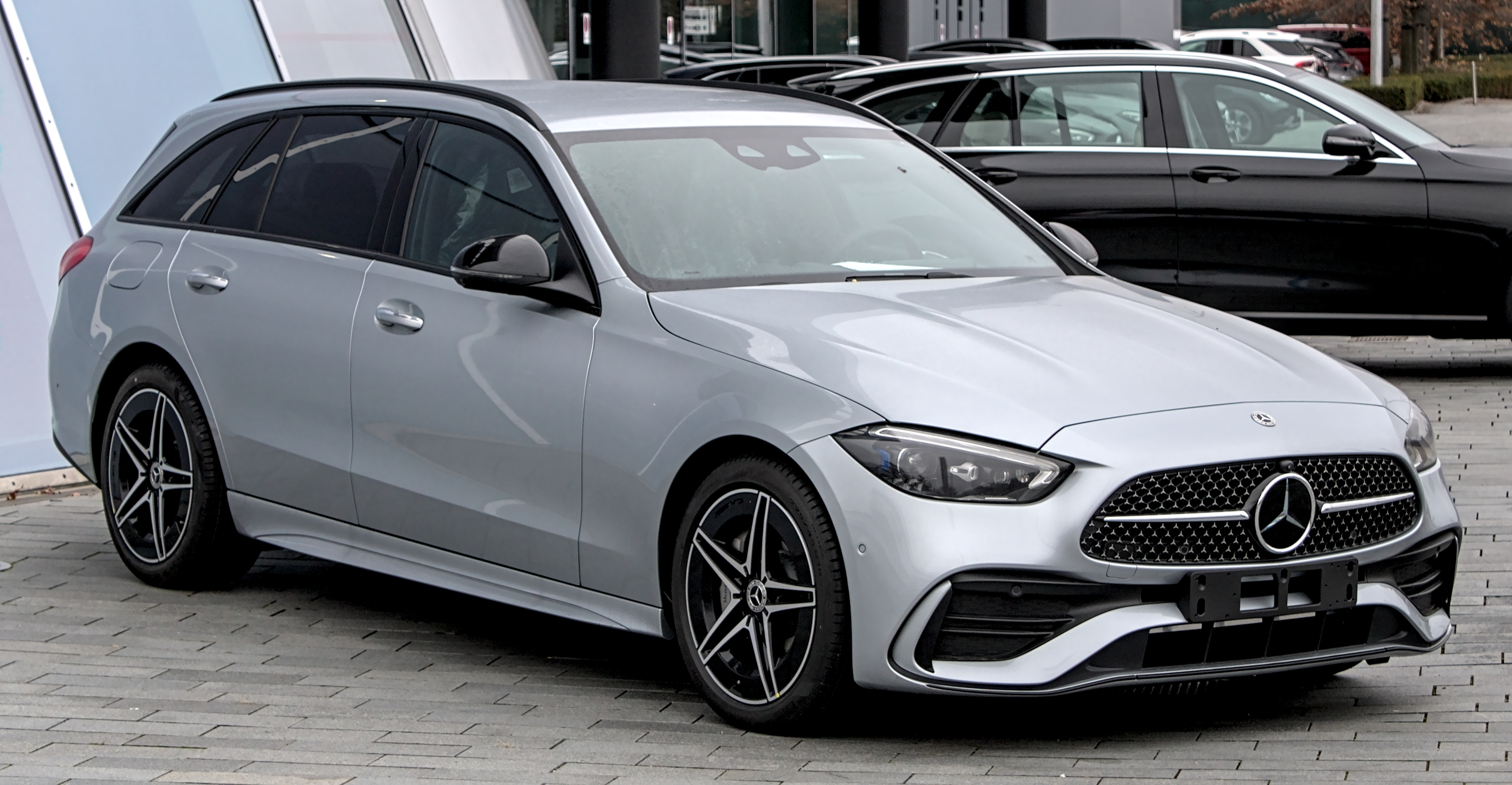
Mercedes-Benz C-Class AMG Line

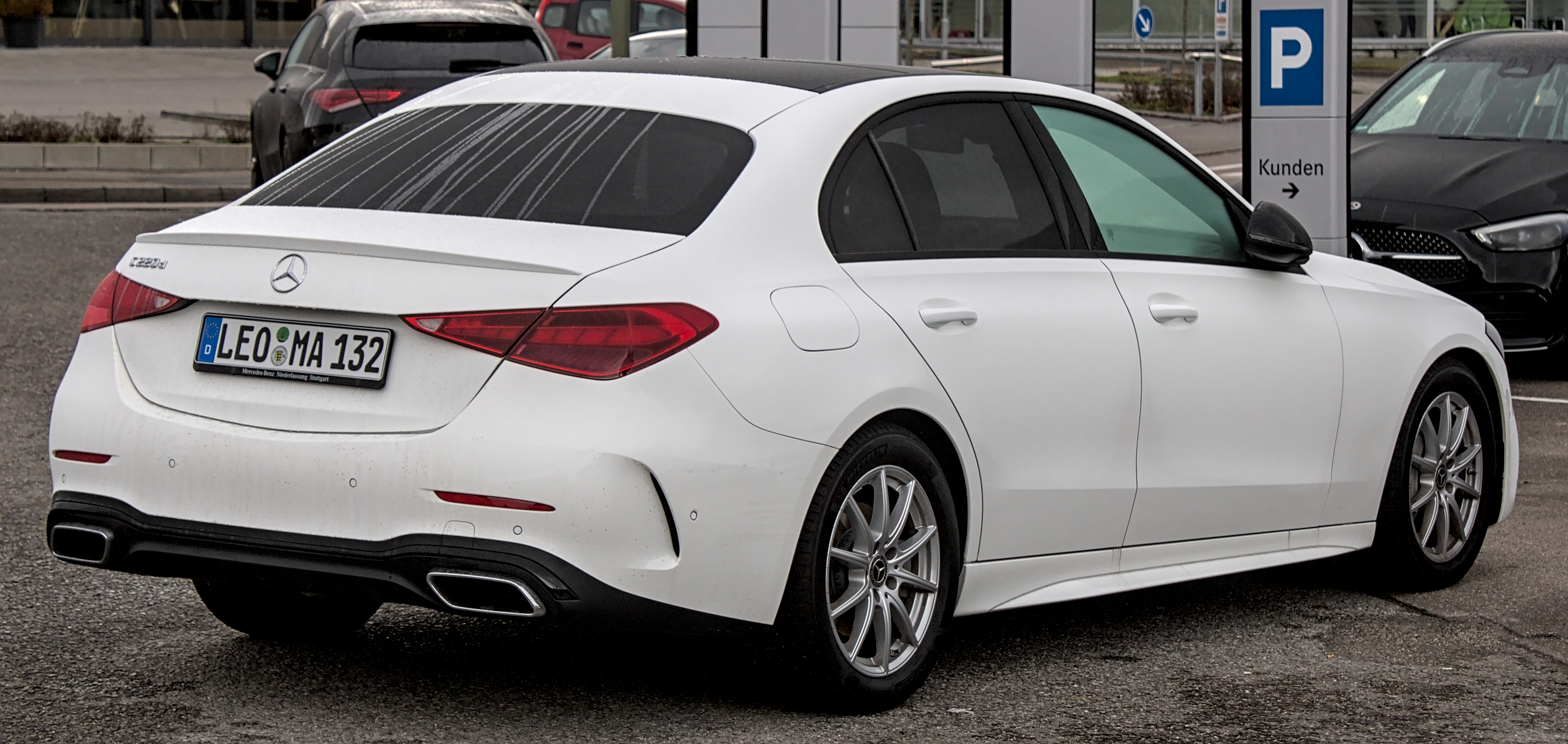
Mercedes-Benz C-Class AMG Line

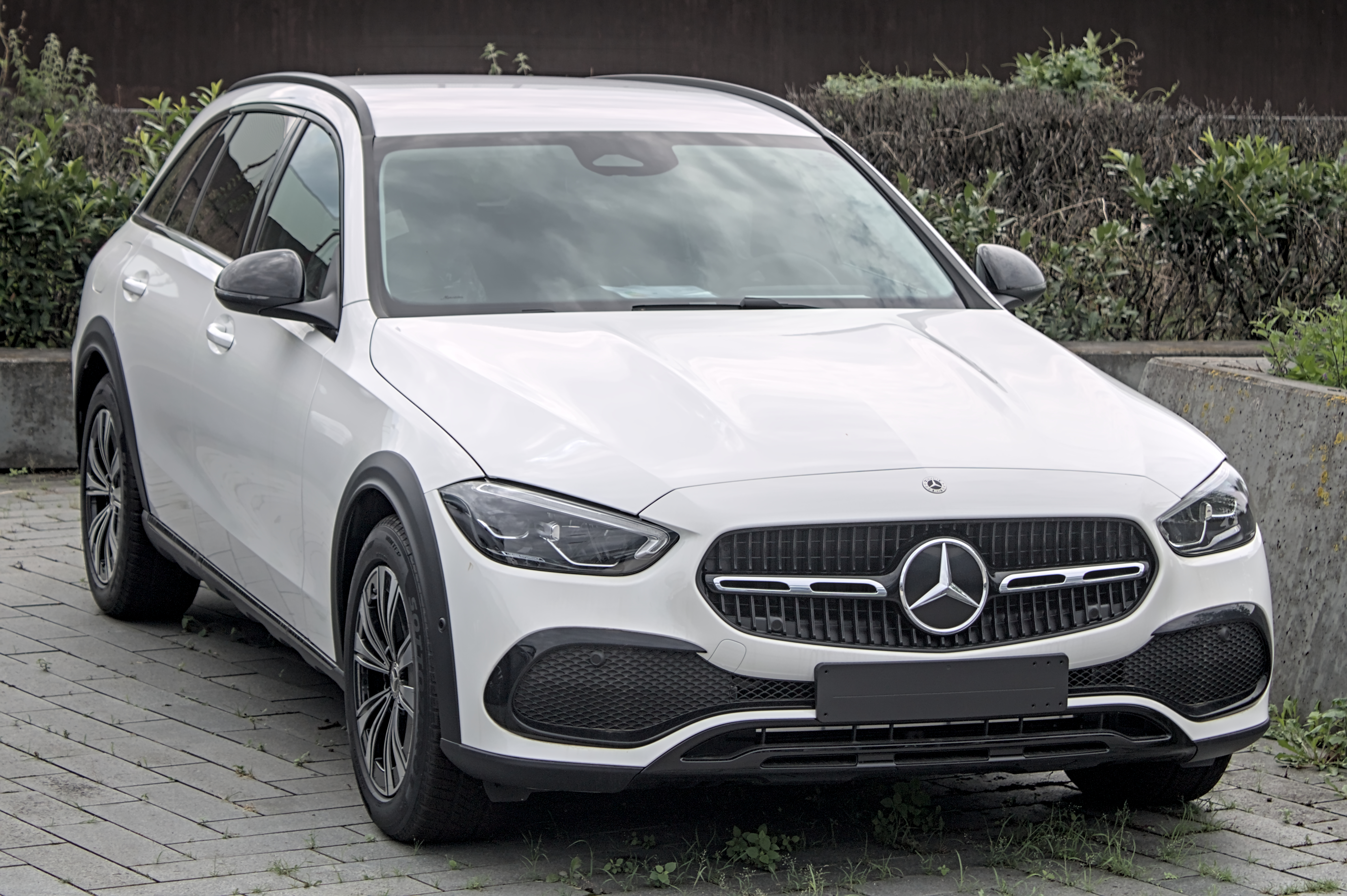
Mercedes-Benz C-Class All-Terrain

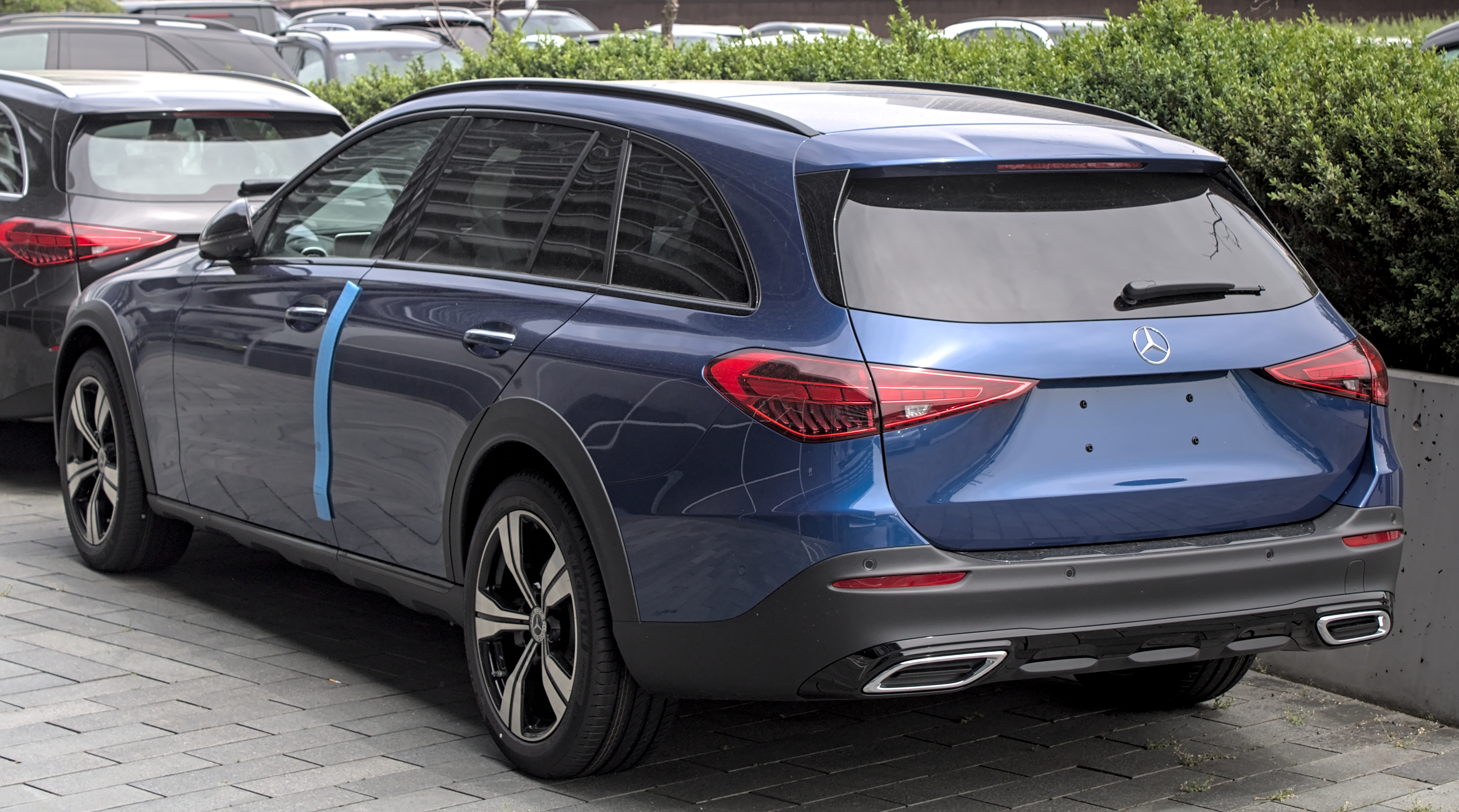
Mercedes-Benz C-Class All-Terrain

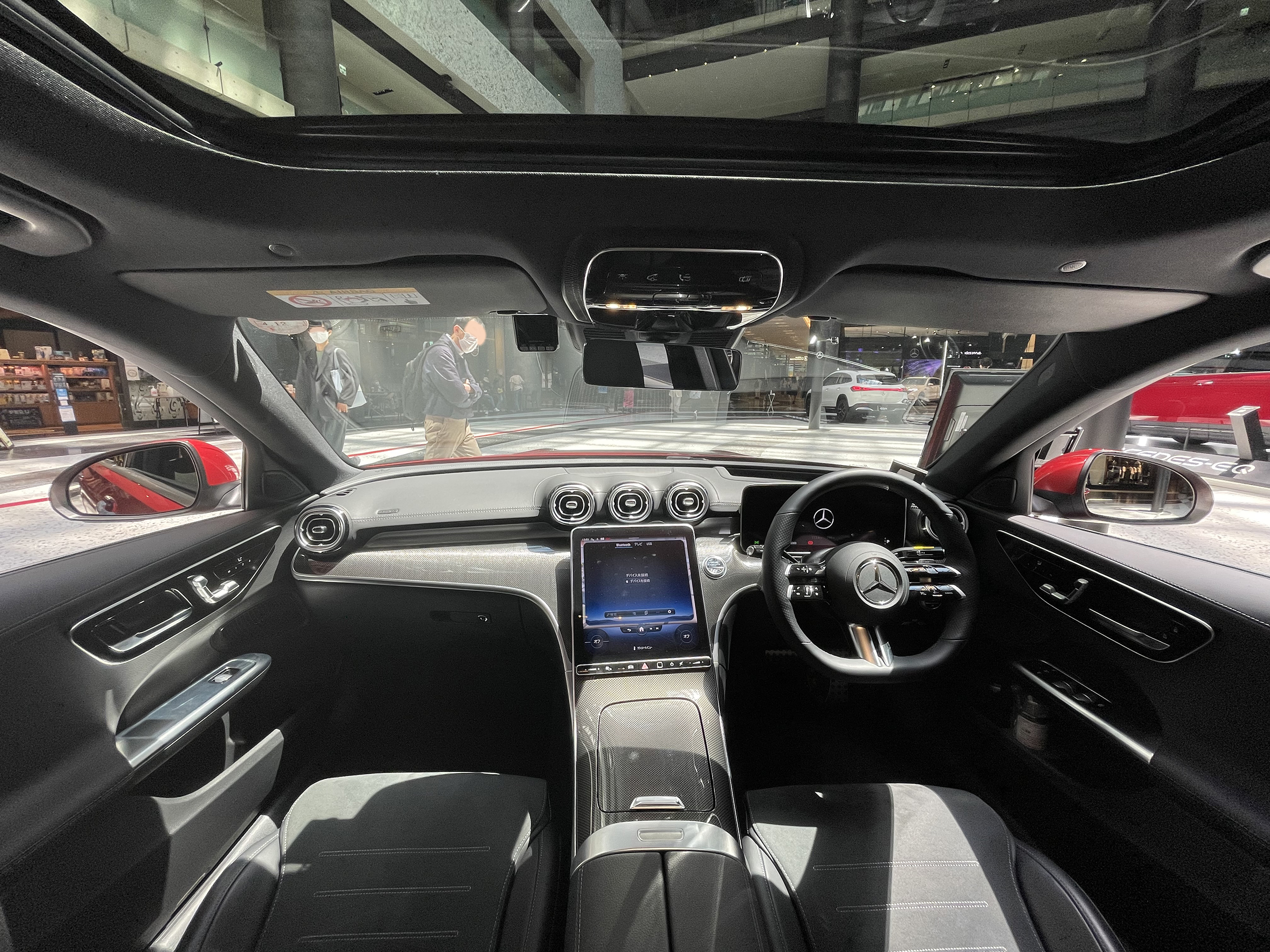
Interior

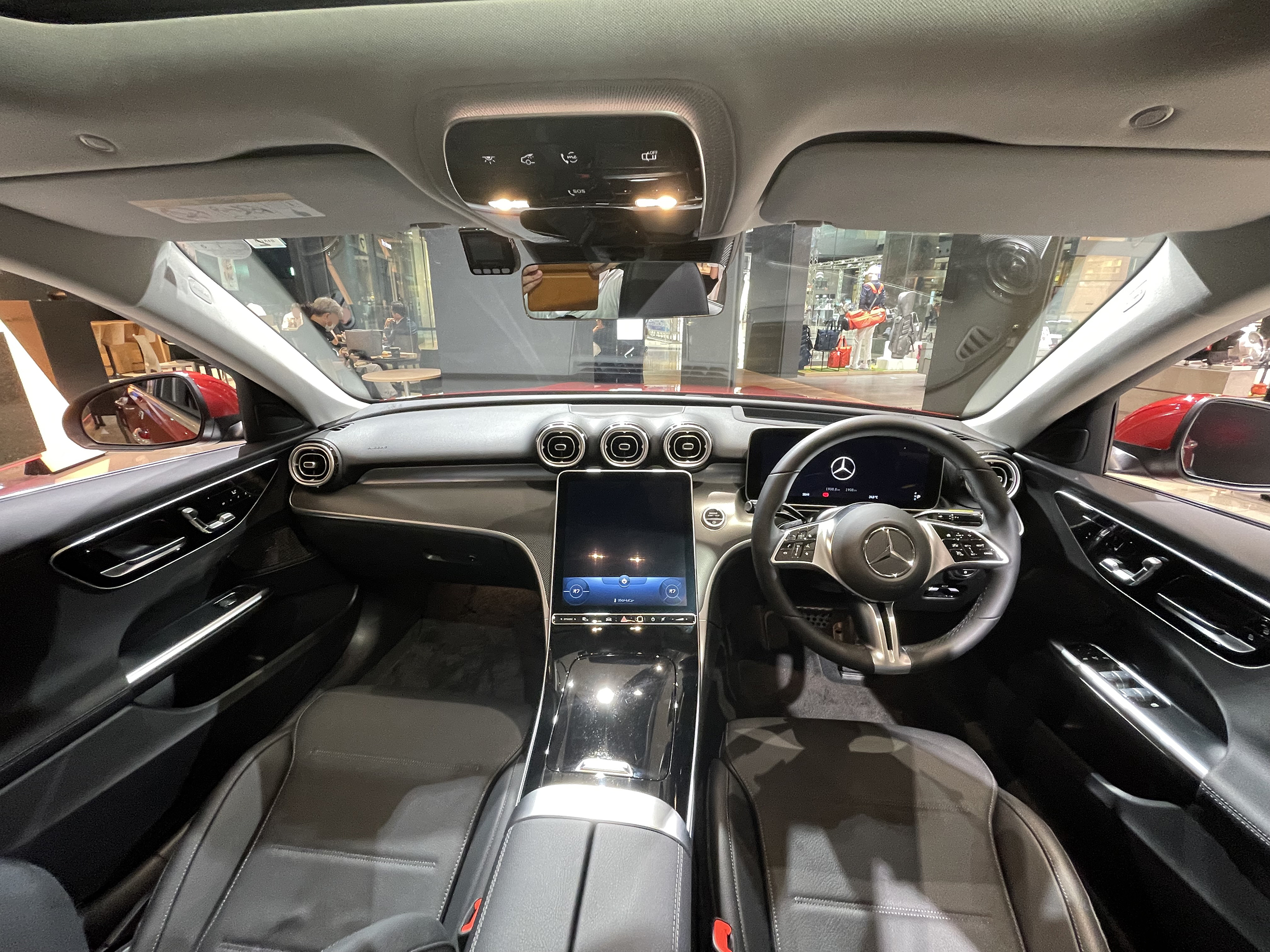
Interior

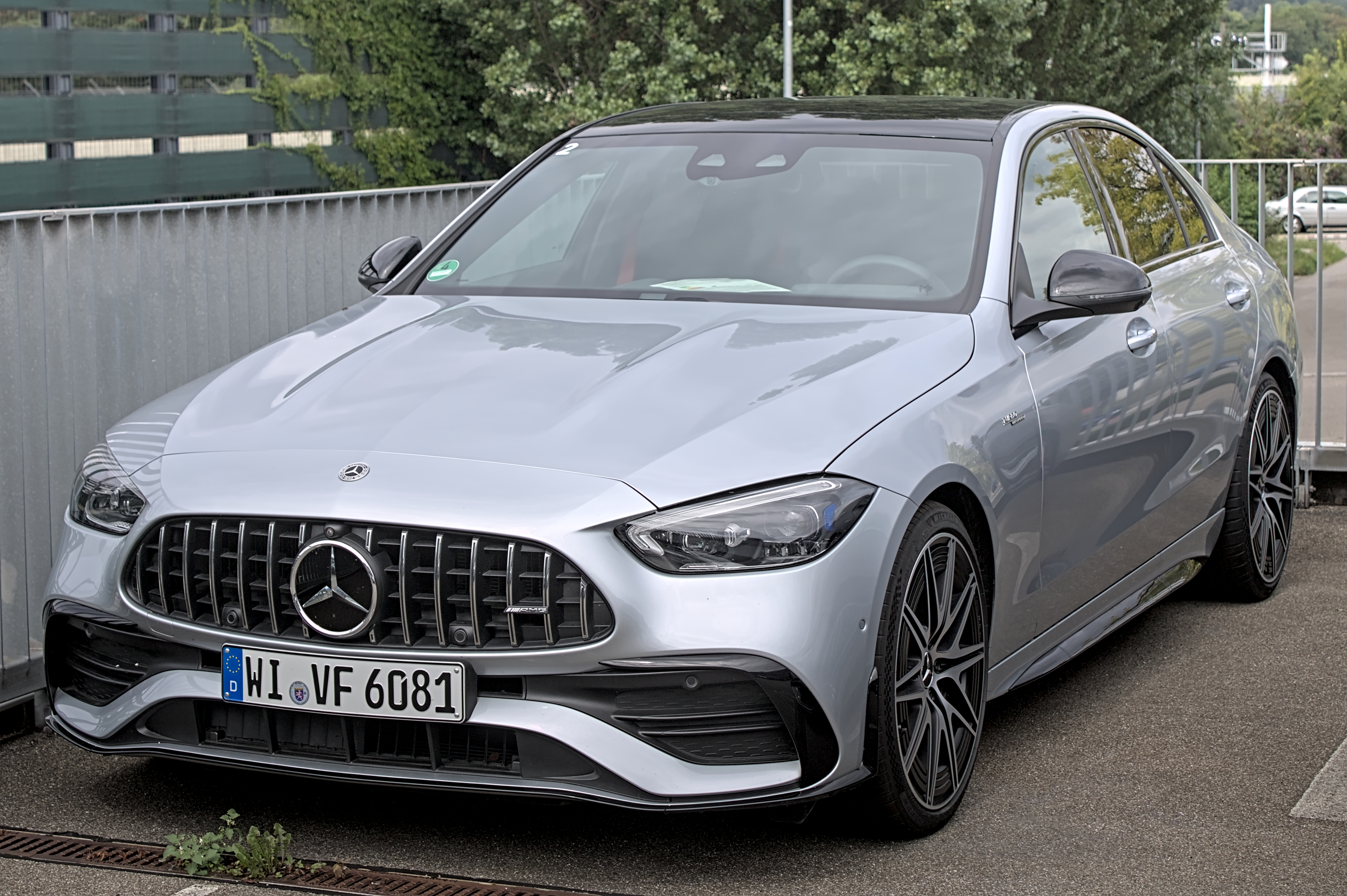
Mercedes-AMG C 43 sedan

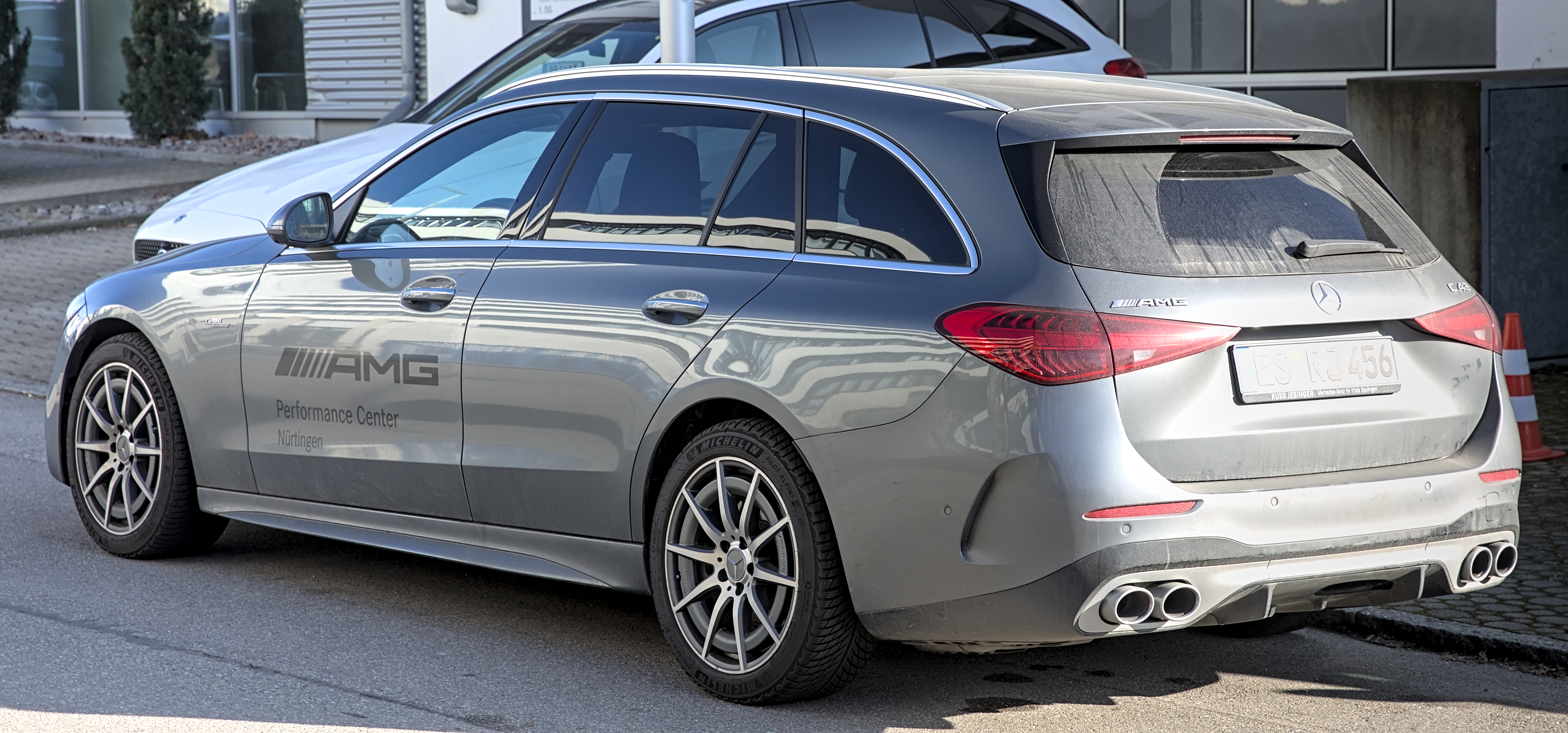
Mercedes-AMG C 43 estate

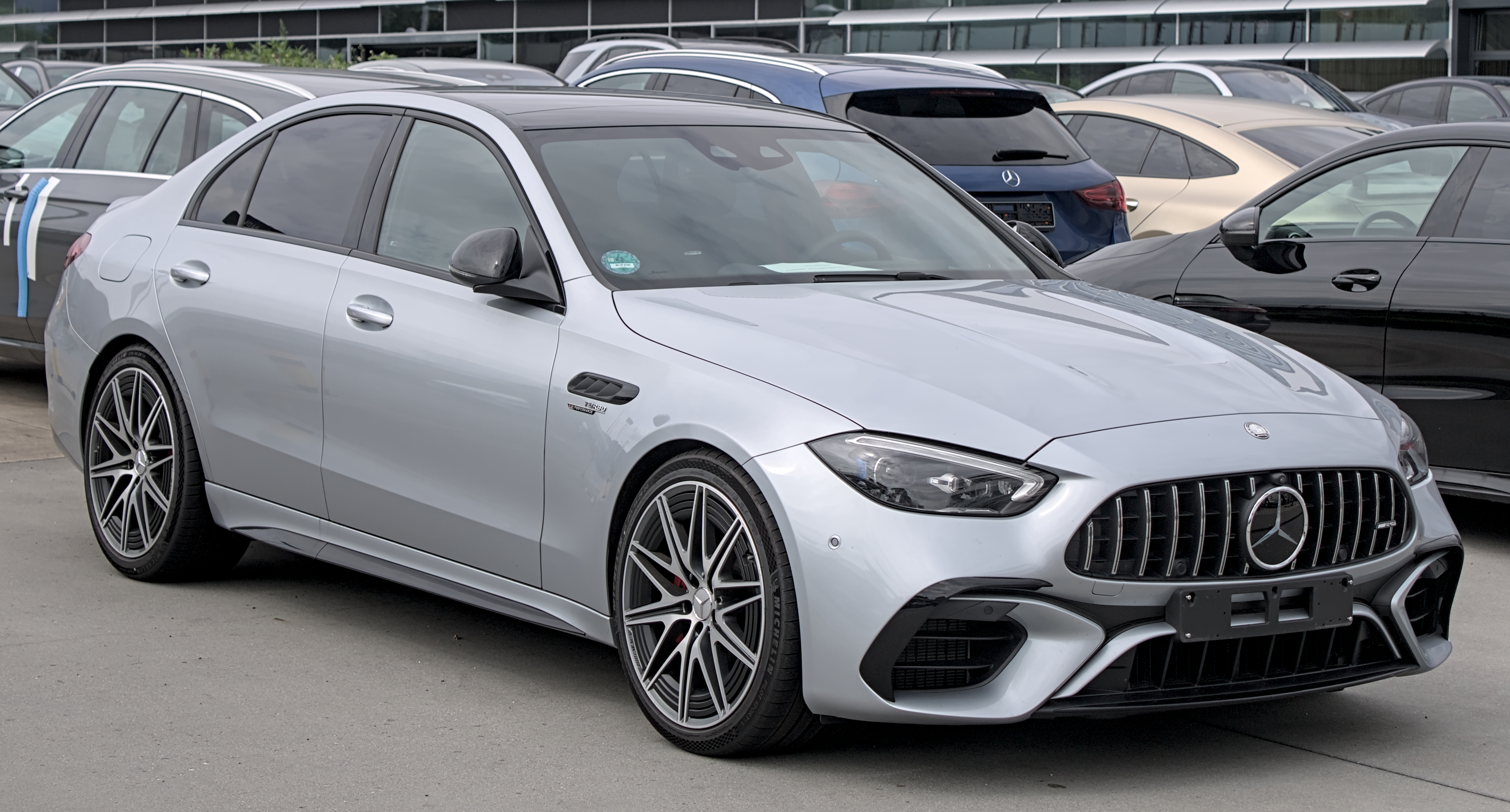
Mercedes-AMG C 63 sedan

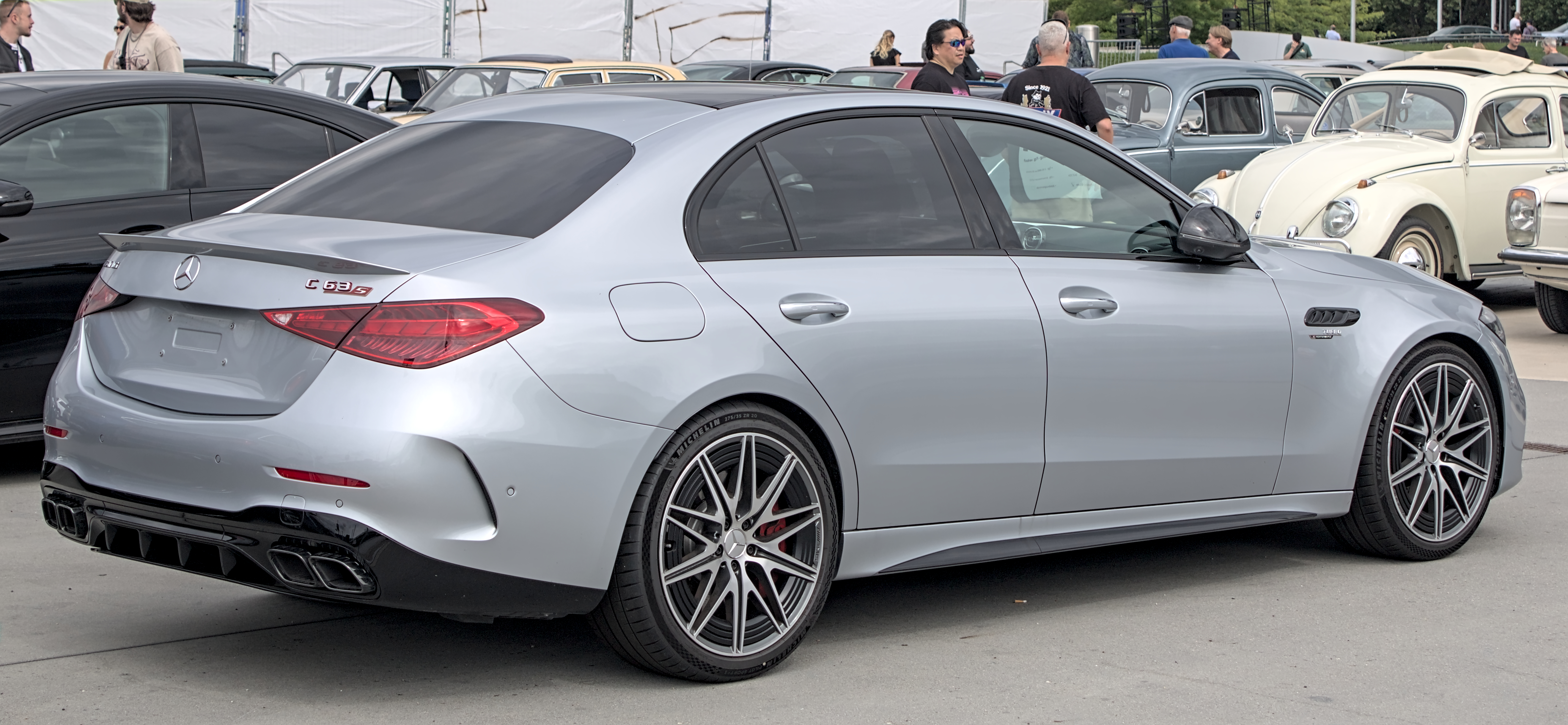
Mercedes-AMG C 63 sedan

== Powertrain ==
The smallest available petrol engine is the 1.5-litre M264 engine offered in the C 180 model (rated power 125 kW (168 hp; 170 PS)), and in the C 200 model (rated power 150 kW (201 hp; 204 PS)). The C 300 model is powered by a 2.0-litre M254 petrol engine rated 190 kW (255 hp; 258 PS). The M254 is equipped with a twin-scroll "segmented" turbocharger featuring an overboost function that allows it to produce an additional 26 kW for up to 30 seconds, as well as a 48V electric supercharger that provides assist at low engine speeds.

Daimler initially offers two Diesel models, the C 220d, and the C 300d. Both models are powered by the same 1992 cm^{3} OM654 engine, rated 147 kW (197 hp; 200 PS) in the C 220d, and 195 kW (261 hp; 265 PS) in the C 300d. Compared with the preceding Diesel engine, the OM654 has a new crankshaft that increases the stroke to 94.3 millimeters, and a water-cooled, variable turbine geometry turbocharger. In July 2021, the C 200d was introduced with a detuned version of the above engine, now producing 120 kW (163 PS; 161 bhp) of power and 380 N⋅m (280 lb⋅ft) of torque.

Daimler has announced that it will be offering a plug-in hybrid model with a petrol engine, the C 300e, as well as a plug-in hybrid model with a diesel engine, the C 300de. The mainline C-class 4Matic models and AMG C43 continue to use permanent AWD with an open double-planetary type center differential. The two axles are linked by a pre-loaded two plate clutch with a locking action of 50nM. Two versions of Magna's Trumax open center differential transfer case are used. The non-AMG models use the version geared for a 45/55 front-to-rear torque split. AMG C43 models are offered with the more rear-biased AMG-Performance Permanent AWD, which uses a center differential geared for a 31/69 front-to-rear torque split. The AMG C63 uses the AMG-Performance 4Matic+ AWD. This system replaces the open center differential with an electronically controlled multi-disc clutch which enables stepless coupling of the front axle to the drivetrain. The rear axle is permanently driven. Drive torque distribution to the front axle is infinitely variable throughout the range of between 0 and 50% of total gearbox output torque. The plug-in hybrid models are supposed to have an all-electric range of 100 kilometres.

As of April 2022, AMG offers a new engine in the C 43 4MATIC: a turbocharged 2.0-litre 4-cylinder M139 engine + 48V electric motor, rated at a combined 320 kW (429 hp; 435 PS).

The M139 4-cylinder engine in the C 63 S E-Performance produces 350 kW (469 hp), giving it a specific output of 235 hp (175 kW) per litre or 117 hp (87.5 kW) per cylinder, making it the current most powerful four-cylinder engine in serial production.

Model	Years	Engines	Power	Torque	0–100 km/h (0–62 mph)	Top speed (km/h)	Fuel consumption/efficiency (NEDC)
Petrol engines
C 180 / C 200 L	2021–	1,496 cc (91.3 cu in) turbocharged 16V I4 (M264 E15 DEH LA) + 48V Electric Motor (MHEV)	125 kW (170 PS; 168 hp) + 15 kW (20 PS; 20 hp) at 5,500–6,100 rpm	250 N⋅m (184 lb⋅ft) at 1,800–4,000 rpm 200 N⋅m (148 lb⋅ft)	8.6 seconds	231 km/h (144 mph)	6.5–6.2 L/100 km (36–38 mpg_{‑US})
C 200 / C 260 L	2021–	1,496 cc (91.3 cu in) turbocharged 16V I4 (M264 E15 DEH LA) + 48V Electric Motor (MHEV)	150 kW (204 PS; 201 hp) + 15 kW (20 PS; 20 hp) at 5,800–6,100 rpm	300 N⋅m (221 lb⋅ft) + 200 N⋅m (148 lb⋅ft) at 1,800–4,000 rpm	7.3 seconds	246 km/h (153 mph)	6.6–6.2 L/100 km (36–38 mpg_{‑US})
C 200 4MATIC	2021–	1,496 cc (91.3 cu in) turbocharged 16V I4 (M264 E15 DEH LA) + 48V Electric Motor (MHEV)	150 kW (204 PS; 201 hp) + 15 kW (20 PS; 20 hp) at 5,800–6,100 rpm	300 N⋅m (221 lb⋅ft) + 200 N⋅m (148 lb⋅ft) at 1,800–4,000 rpm	7.1 seconds	241 km/h (150 mph)	6.9–6.5 L/100 km (34–36 mpg_{‑US})
C 300	2021–	1,999 cc (122.0 cu in) turbocharged 16V I4 (M264 E20 DEH LA)	190 kW (258 PS; 255 hp) at 5,800 rpm	400 N⋅m (295 lb⋅ft) at 1,800-5,800 rpm	6.0 seconds	250 km/h (155 mph)	7.0–6.6 L/100 km (34–36 mpg_{‑US})
C 300 4MATIC	2021–	1,999 cc (122.0 cu in) turbocharged 16V I4 (M264 E20 DEH LA)	190 kW (258 PS; 255 hp) at 5,800 rpm	400 N⋅m (295 lb⋅ft) at 1,800-5,800 rpm	6.0 seconds	250 km/h (155 mph)	7.3–7.0 L/100 km (32–34 mpg_{‑US})
AMG C 43 4MATIC	2023–	1,991 cc (121.5 cu in) turbocharged 16V I4 (M139) + 48V electric motor (MHEV)	320 kW (435 PS; 429 hp)	500 N⋅m (369 lb⋅ft)	4.6 seconds	250 km/h (155 mph)	
Diesel engines
C 200d	2021–	1,992 cc (121.6 cu in) turbocharged 16V I4 (OM654 DE20 R SCR) + 48V Electric Motor (MHEV)	120 kW (163 PS; 161 bhp) + 15 kW (20 PS; 20 hp) at 4,200 rpm	380 N⋅m (280 lb⋅ft) + 200 N⋅m (148 lb⋅ft) at 1,800–2,800 rpm	7.7 seconds	226 km/h (140 mph)	4.5–4.2 L/100 km (52–56 mpg_{‑US})
C 220d	2021–	1,992 cc (121.6 cu in) turbocharged 16V I4 (OM654 DE20 R SCR) + 48V Electric Motor (MHEV)	147 kW (200 PS; 197 bhp) + 15 kW (20 PS; 20 hp) at 4,200 rpm	440 N⋅m (325 lb⋅ft) + 200 N⋅m (148 lb⋅ft) at 1,800–2,800 rpm	7.3 seconds	245 km/h (152 mph)	5.2–5.0 L/100 km (45–47 mpg_{‑US})
C 220d 4MATIC	2021–	1,992 cc (121.6 cu in) turbocharged 16V I4 (OM654 DE20 R SCR) + 48V Electric Motor (MHEV)	147 kW (200 PS; 197 bhp) + 15 kW (20 PS; 20 hp) at 4,200 rpm	440 N⋅m (325 lb⋅ft) + 200 N⋅m (148 lb⋅ft) at 1,800–2,800 rpm	7.4 seconds	237 km/h (147 mph)	5.4–5.2 L/100 km (44–45 mpg_{‑US})
C 300d	2021–	1,992 cc (121.6 cu in) turbocharged 16V I4 (OM654 DE20 R SCR) + 48V Electric Motor (MHEV)	195 kW (265 PS; 261 bhp) + 15 kW (20 PS; 20 hp) at 4,200 rpm	550 N⋅m (406 lb⋅ft) + 200 N⋅m (148 lb⋅ft) at 1,800–2,200 rpm	5.7 seconds	250 km/h (155 mph)	5.3–5.0 L/100 km (44–47 mpg_{‑US})
C 300d 4MATIC	2021–	1,992 cc (121.6 cu in) turbocharged 16V I4 (OM654 DE20 R SCR) + 48V Electric Motor (MHEV)	195 kW (265 PS; 261 bhp) + 15 kW (20 PS; 20 hp) at 4,200 rpm	550 N⋅m (406 lb⋅ft) + 200 N⋅m (148 lb⋅ft) at 1,800–2,200 rpm	5.9 seconds	250 km/h (155 mph)	5.3–5.0 L/100 km (44–47 mpg_{‑US})
Plug-in hybrid engines
C 300e / C 300e 4MATIC; C 350e (Thailand)	2021–	1,999 cc (122.0 cu in) turbocharged 16V I4 (M254 E20 DEH LA) + Electric Motor (PHEV)	150 kW (204 PS; 201 hp) at 6,100 rpm (Engine) + 95 kW (129 PS; 127 hp) (Motor); 230 kW (313 PS; 308 hp) (Combined)	320 N⋅m (236 lb⋅ft) at 2,000–4,400 rpm (Engine) + 440 N⋅m (325 lb⋅ft) (Motor); 550 N⋅m (406 lb⋅ft) (Combined)	6.1 seconds	245 km/h (152 mph)	
C 300de / C 300de 4MATIC	2022-	1,993 cc (121.6 cu in) turbocharged 16V I4 (OM654 DE20 SCR) + Electric Motor (PHEV)	145 kW (197 PS; 194 hp) at 6,100 rpm (Engine) + 95 kW (129 PS; 127 hp) (Motor); 230 kW (313 PS; 308 hp) (Combined)	440 N⋅m (325 lb⋅ft) at 1,800-2,800 rpm (Engine) + 440 N⋅m (325 lb⋅ft) (Motor); 700 N⋅m (516 lb⋅ft) (Combined)	6.2 seconds	245 km/h (152 mph)	
C 400e 4MATIC	2023–	1,999 cc (122.0 cu in) turbocharged 16V I4 (M254 E20 DEH LA) + Electric Motor (PHEV)	185 kW (252 PS; 248 hp) (Engine) + 95 kW (129 PS; 127 hp) (Motor) 280 kW (381 PS; 375 hp) (Combined)	400 N⋅m (295 lb⋅ft) at 3,200–4,000 rpm (Engine) + 440 N⋅m (325 lb⋅ft) (Motor) 650 N⋅m (479 lb⋅ft) (Combined)	5.4 seconds	250 km/h (155 mph)	
AMG C 63 S E Performance	2023–	1,991 cc (121.5 cu in) turbocharged 16V I4 (M139L) + Electric Motor (PHEV)	350 kW (476 PS; 469 hp) (Engine) + 150 kW (204 PS; 201 hp) (Motor); 500 kW (680 PS; 671 hp) (Combined)	545 N⋅m (402 lb⋅ft) at 5,250–5,500 rpm (Engine) + 440 N⋅m (325 lb⋅ft) (Motor); 1,020 N⋅m (752 lb⋅ft) (Combined)	3.4 seconds	250–280 km/h (155–174 mph)	

== 2026 facelift ==
The facelifted W206 C-Class was unveiled on 17 August 2026, with orders opening in Germany the following day. The update introduced a more upright radiator grille with an illuminated surround, redesigned bumpers and headlamps with three-pointed-star-shaped daytime running lights. The sedan also received star-shaped taillight graphics, while the estate retained the rear light design of the pre-facelift model.

The interior retained the 12.3-inch instrument display and 11.9-inch touchscreen, but received the fourth generation of MBUX running on the Mercedes-Benz Operating System (MB.OS). The MBUX Virtual Assistant incorporates artificial-intelligence services from ChatGPT, Microsoft Bing and Google Gemini, while the navigation system is based on Google Maps. A revised steering wheel also reintroduced physical rocker and roller controls for functions including cruise control and audio volume.

The engine range was revised in preparation for Euro 7 emissions regulations. Petrol models use an updated 2.0-litre M254 Evo engine, while diesel models use an updated OM654 Evo four-cylinder. Non-plug-in variants use a second-generation 48-volt integrated starter-generator capable of providing up to 17 kW (23 hp) of additional output. The C 400 e 4MATIC plug-in hybrid combines a petrol engine with an electric motor for a system output of 290 kW (389 hp) and 650 N⋅m (479 lb⋅ft) of torque. Its 19.53 kWh usable battery provides an electric range of up to 100 km (62 mi) on the WLTP cycle and supports charging at up to 11 kW AC and 55 kW DC.

The suspension was also retuned, while the optional rear-axle steering system retained a maximum steering angle of 2.5 degrees, reducing the turning circle to 10.64 m (34.9 ft).

== Safety ==
=== Euro NCAP ===
Euro NCAP test results Mercedes-Benz C 180 AMG Line (LHD) (2022)
Test	Points	%
Overall:	5 /5 stars	
Adult occupant:	35.6	93%
Child occupant:	43.7	89%
Pedestrian:	43.3	80%
Safety assist:	13.2	82%

=== IIHS ===
IIHS scores (2024 model year)
Small overlap front	Good	
Moderate overlap front (original test)	Good	
Moderate overlap front (updated test)	Good	
Side (updated test)	Good	
Headlights	Good	Acceptable
Front crash prevention: vehicle-to-pedestrian (standard system)	Acceptable	
Front crash prevention: vehicle-to-pedestrian (optional system)	Superior	
Seatbelt reminders	Good	
Child seat anchors (LATCH) ease of use	Good+	

=== ANCAP ===
ANCAP test results Mercedes-Benz C-Class (2022, aligned with Euro NCAP)
Test	Points	%
Overall:	5 /5 stars	
Adult occupant:	34.60	91%
Child occupant:	44.10	90%
Pedestrian:	43.29	80%
Safety assist:	13.53	84%
