= Mercedes-Benz SL (R232) =

Seventh-generation Mercedes-Benz SL-Class

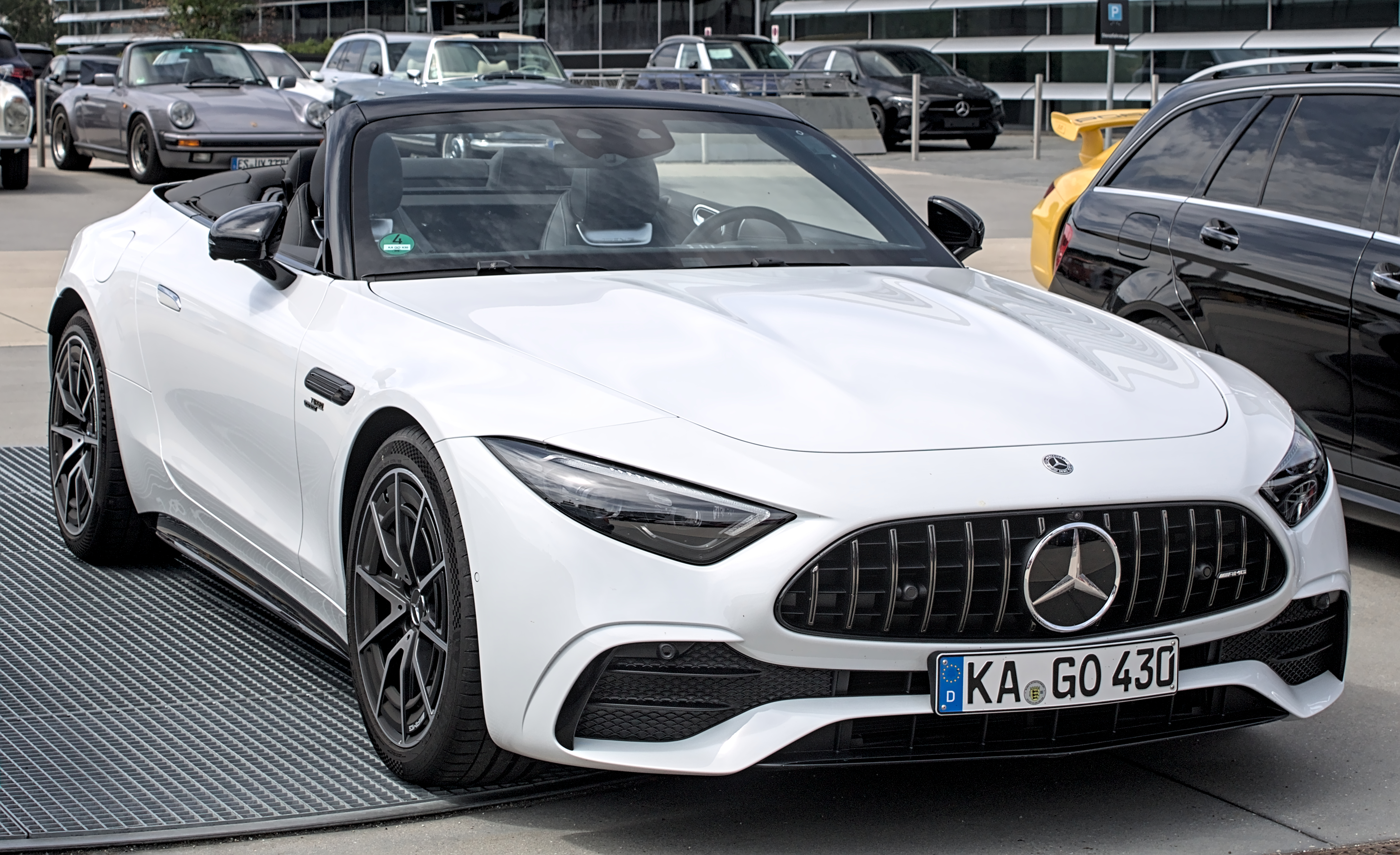
- Mercedes-AMG SL 43

Overview
- Manufacturer: Mercedes-Benz
- Model code: R232
- Production: March 2022–present
- Assembly: Germany: Bremen
- Designer: Mark Fetherston, Slavche Tanevski

Body and chassis
- Class: Roadster (S)
- Body style: 2-door 2+2 roadster
- Layout: Front-engine, rear-wheel-drive Front-engine, all-wheel-drive (4Matic+)
- Platform: MSA

Powertrain
- Engine: Petrol: 2.0 L M139 mild hybrid turbo (EQ Boost) I4; 4.0 L M177 twin-turbo V8; Petrol-PHEV: 4.0 L M177 biturbo plug-in hybrid V8 (63 S E Performance)
- Electric motor: 14 hp (10 kW) electrically assisted turbocharger system by Garrett Motion; 150 kW (201 hp) synchronous electric motor (63 S E Performance)
- Transmission: 9-speed Mercedes-AMG Speedshift MCT 9G-Tronic automatic
- Hybrid drivetrain: Plug-in (63 S E Performance)
- Battery: AMG 400-volt high-performance battery, 4.8 kWh

Dimensions
- Wheelbase: 2,700 mm (106.3 in)
- Length: 4,705 mm (185.2 in)
- Width: 1,915 mm (75.4 in)
- Height: 1,359 mm (53.5 in)
- Curb weight: 1,735–2,195 kg (3,825–4,839 lb)

Chronology
- Predecessor: Mercedes-Benz R231; Mercedes-AMG GT Roadster (R190); Mercedes-Benz S-Class Cabriolet (A217)

The Mercedes-Benz SL (R232) is the seventh generation of the Mercedes-Benz SL-Class roadster, succeeding the R231 model. Introduced on 28 October 2021, the R232 serves as a direct replacement for the GT Roadster. It was exclusively marketed under the Mercedes-AMG brand until the introduction of the Mercedes-Maybach SL in August 2024.

== Design ==
=== Roof system ===
The R232 has several departures from its previous SL-Class predecessors, one of which is the design of the convertible roof. AMG switched from a folding metal roof to a fabric-lined roof that utilizes electric motors, instead of hydraulics, which reduces the weight of the car by 21 kg (46 lb). This was reportedly done to lower the center of gravity for improved handling, as well as to have a more sloping rear end design. The R232 is also fitted with the fourth generation of Mercedes all-wheel-drive system, 4Matic, and rear-axle steering.

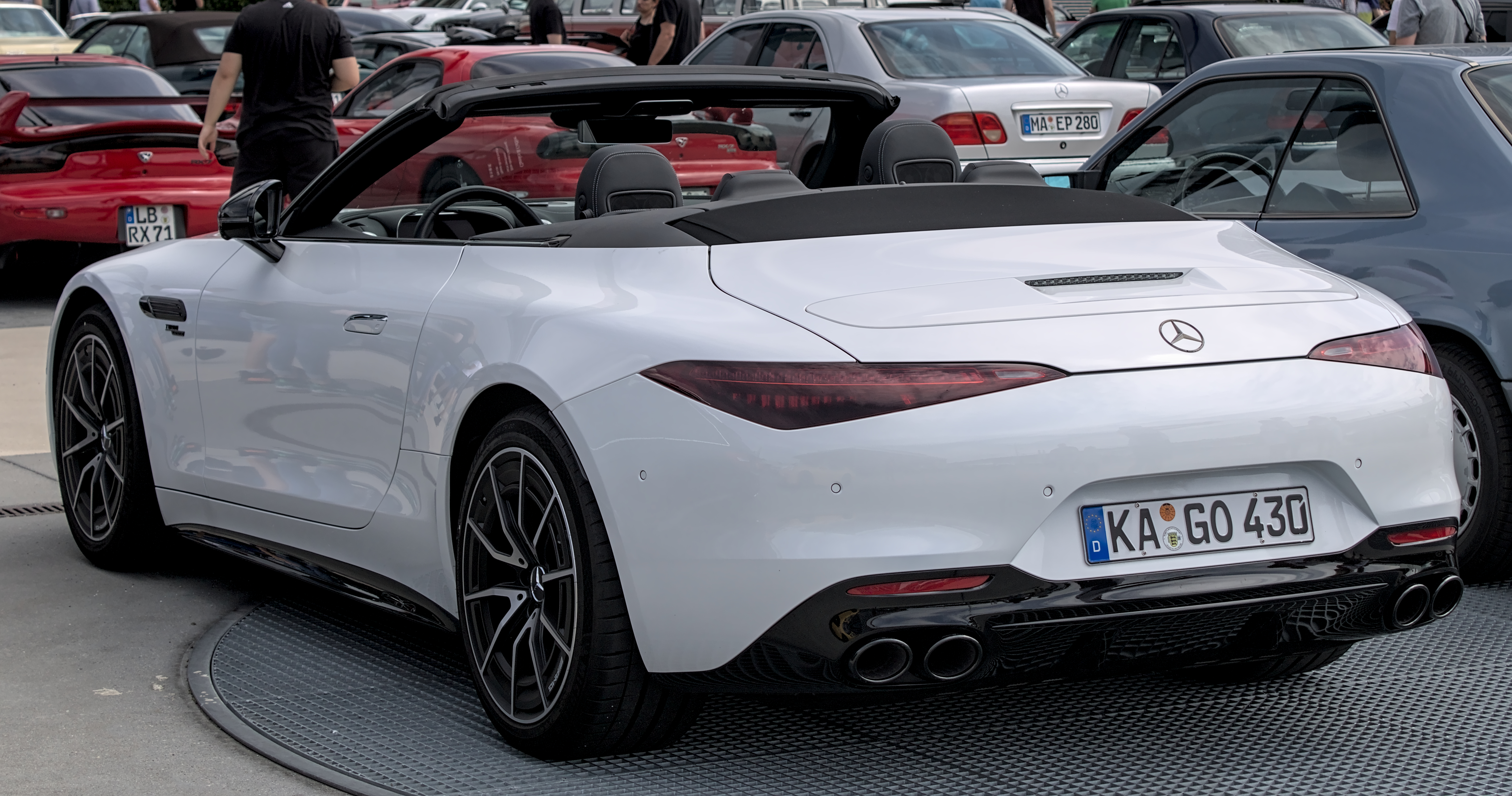
Rear view

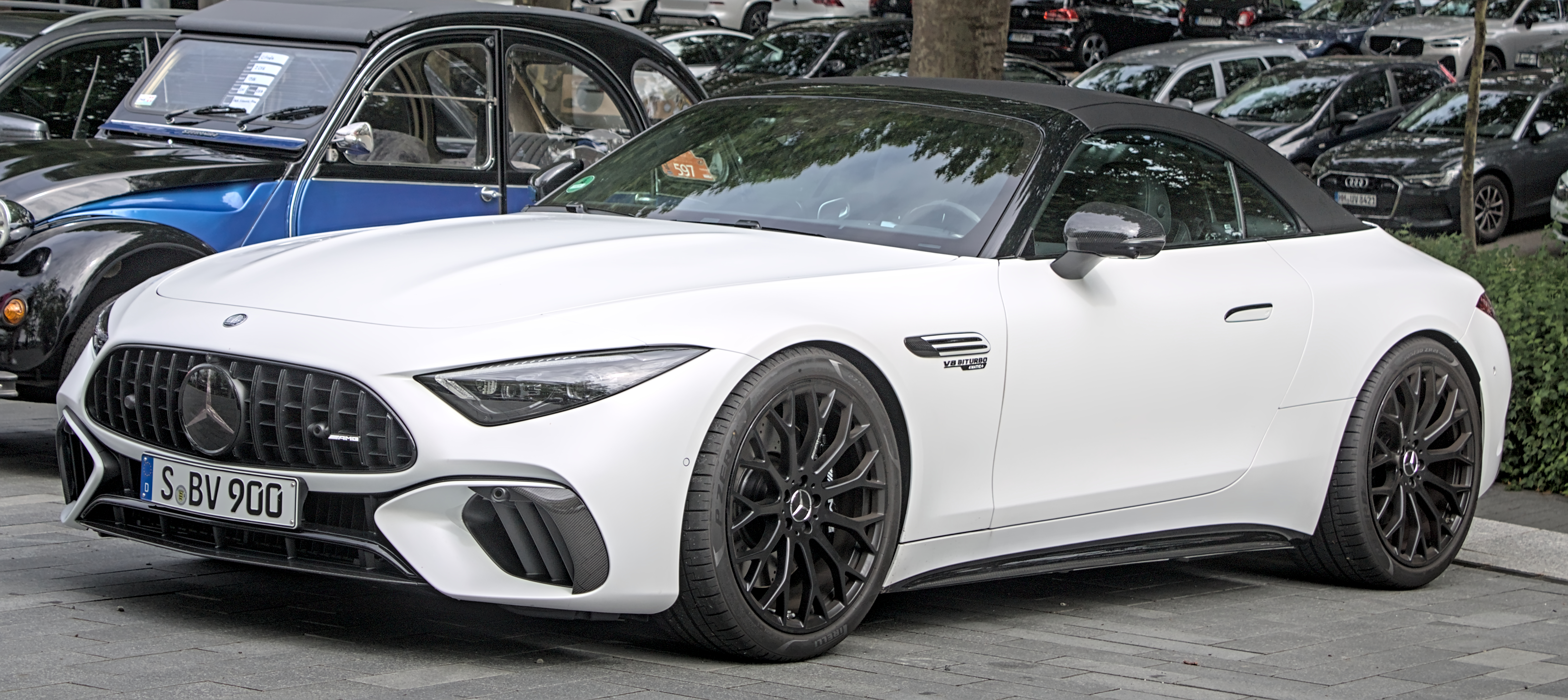
SL 63

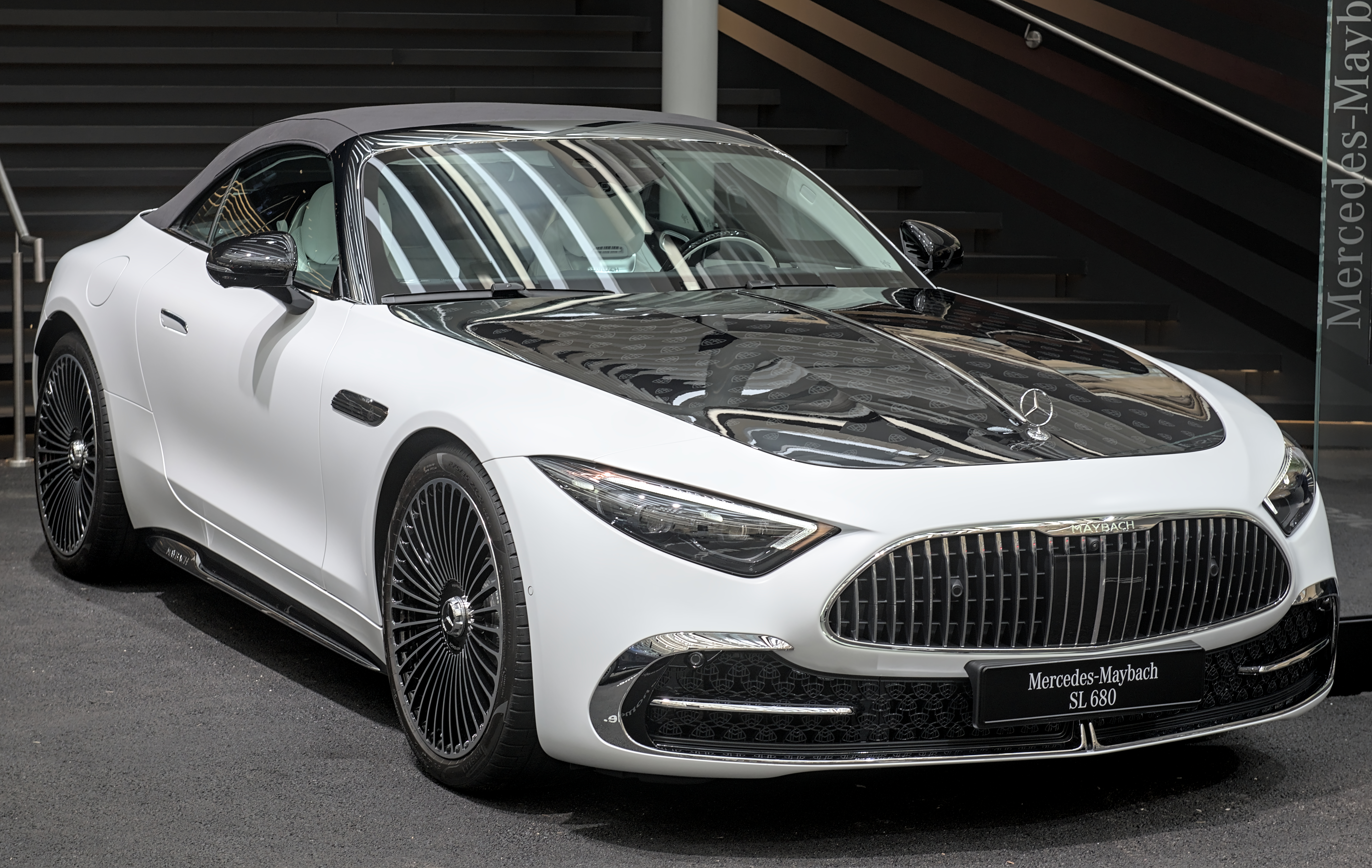
Mercedes-Maybach SL 680 Monogram

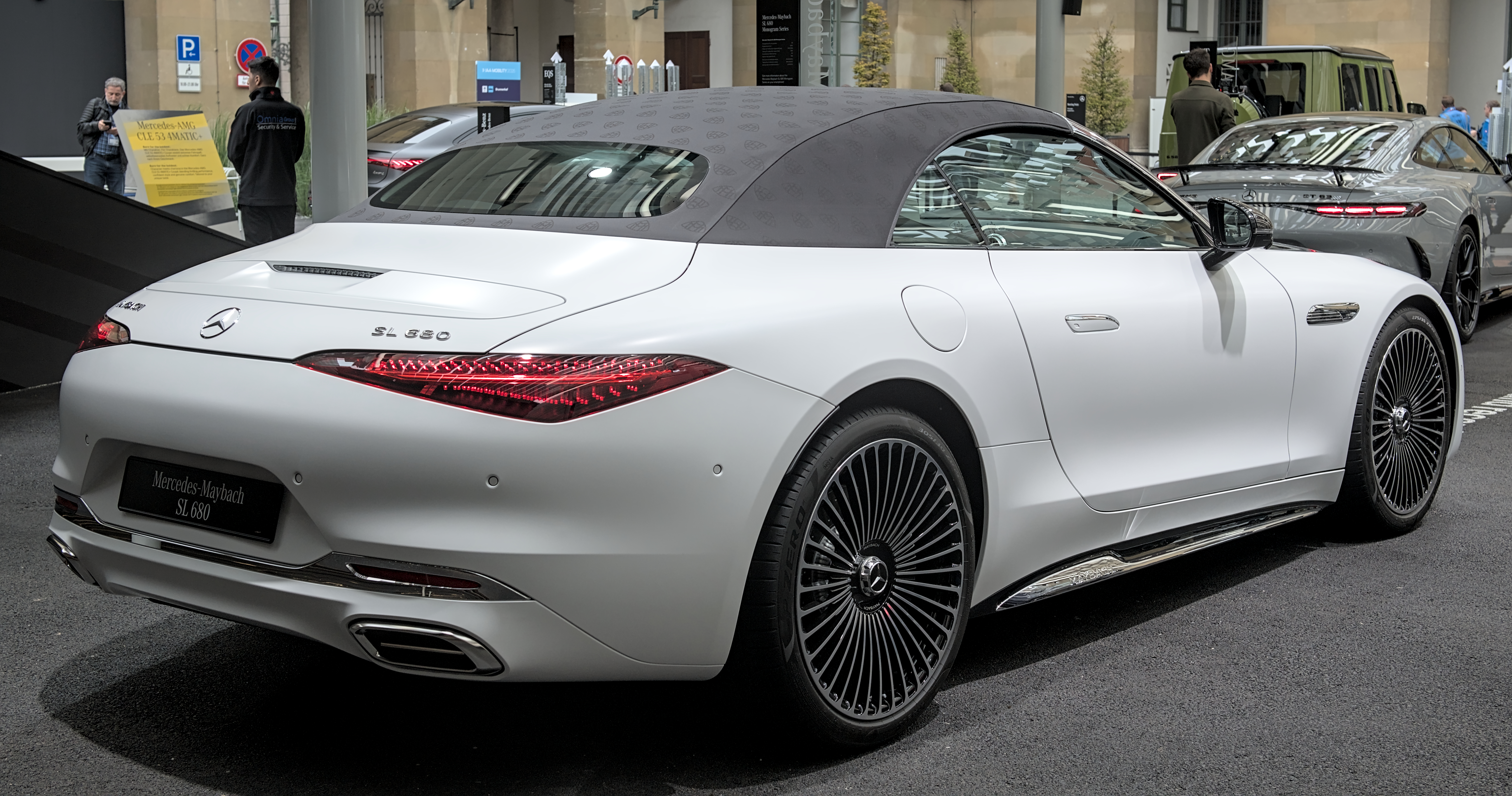
Rear view (SL 680)

=== Interior ===
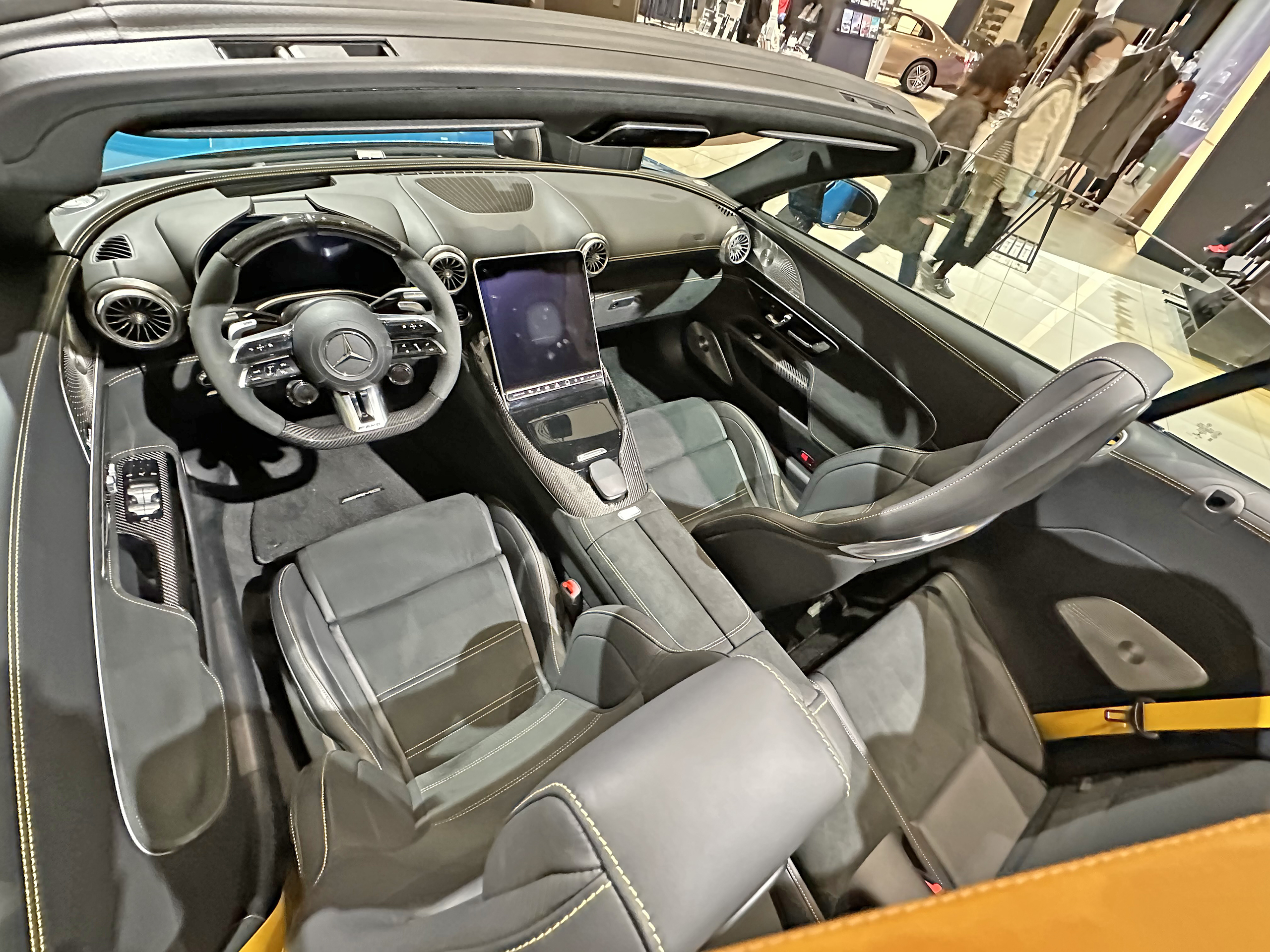
Interior (SL 63)

The R232 reintroduced 2+2 seating as standard for the SL, a feature which hadn't been present on an SL model since the C107 and R129, which had the optional 2+2 seating. The dashboard is symmetrical, with a 12.3-inch digital instrument cluster and an 11.9-inch touchscreen panel in the center. The instrument cluster is placed within a binnacle which Mercedes claims to reduce the reflections from the sunlight and improve visibility when the roof is folded down. The touchscreen panel in the center is electronically tiltable to the vertical position for the same reason.

=== Frame ===
The car's platform is an aluminum space frame self-supporting body structure developed by AMG to provide more rigidity. Transverse rigidity and longitudinal rigidity are said to be 50% and 40% higher, respectively compared to the GT roadster platform. AMG's chief technical officer, Jochen Hermann, reported that the SL shell weighs 270 kg (595 lb).

== Technical data ==
At the launch, the sole engine option was a biturbo 4.0-litre V8 with two different levels of output: SL 55 4MATIC+ and SL 63 4MATIC+. The lesser SL 55 is rated at 350 kW (476 PS; 469 bhp) and 700 N⋅m (516 lb⋅ft), while the SL 63 has 430 kW (585 PS; 577 bhp) and 800 N⋅m (590 lb⋅ft). The base six-cylinder inline engine and a more powerful hybrid version of the V8 engine are to be introduced at a later date. The 4-cylinder model is added with the SL 43. The SL 43 is rated at 280 kW (381 PS; 375 bhp) and 480 N⋅m (354 lb⋅ft) which adds an extra 10 kW (14 PS; 13 bhp) for mild hybrid. This marks the first time the SL-Class has been powered by an inline-4 engine since the 190 SL.

Model	Years	Drivetrain	Configuration	Displacement	Power	Torque	0–100 km/h (0–62 mph)	Top speed	Fuel consumption/efficiency (WLTP)
Petrol engines
SL 43	2022–	RWD	M139 I4 turbocharged (electrified)	1,991 cc (121.5 cu in)	280 kW (381 PS; 375 bhp) at 5,500–6,500 rpm	480 N⋅m (354 lb⋅ft) at 2,250-4,500 rpm	4.9 seconds	275 km/h (171 mph)	
SL 55 4MATIC+	2022–	AWD	M177 DE40 LA V8 biturbo	3,982 cc (243.0 cu in)	350 kW (476 PS; 469 bhp) at 5,500–6,500 rpm	700 N⋅m (516 lb⋅ft) at 2,250-4,500 rpm	3.9 seconds	295 km/h (183 mph)	12.7–11.8 L/100 km (18.5–19.9 mpg_{‑US})
Mercedes-Maybach SL 580	2025–	AWD	M177 DE40 LA V8 biturbo	3,982 cc (243.0 cu in)	350 kW (476 PS; 469 bhp) at 5,500–6,500 rpm	700 N⋅m (516 lb⋅ft) at 2,250-4,500 rpm	TBC		12.7–11.8 L/100 km (18.5–19.9 mpg_{‑US})
SL 63 4MATIC+	2022–	AWD	M177 DE40 LA V8 biturbo	3,982 cc (243.0 cu in)	430 kW (585 PS; 577 bhp) at 5,500–6,500 rpm	800 N⋅m (590 lb⋅ft) at 2,500-5,000 rpm	3.6 seconds	315 km/h (196 mph)	
Mercedes-Maybach SL 680	2025–	AWD	M177 DE40 LA V8 biturbo	3,982 cc (243.0 cu in)	430 kW (585 PS; 577 bhp) at 5,500–6,500 rpm	800 N⋅m (590 lb⋅ft) at 2,500-5,000 rpm	4.1 seconds	260 km/h (162 mph)	
Hybrid engines
SL 63 S E Performance	2024–	AWD	M177 DE40 LA V8 biturbo PHEV	3,982 cc (243.0 cu in)	450 kW (612 PS; 603 bhp) at 5,500–6,500 rpm	800 N⋅m (590 lb⋅ft) at 2,500-5,000 rpm	2.9 seconds	317 km/h (197 mph)	
