= Electric supercharger =

Electrical charger for vehicle engines

An electric supercharger is a specific type of supercharger for internal combustion engines that uses an electrically powered forced-air system that contains an electric motor to pressurize the intake air. By pressurizing the air available to the engine intake system, the air becomes more dense, and is matched with more fuel, producing the increased horsepower to the wheels.

== Power supply for electric superchargers ==
An electric supercharger, if supplied by common stock electric accumulators, runs independent of the engine to which it provides its boost. However, electrical energy consumed is often higher than what a production-line generator (e.g. alternator) of the engine can supply. Larger alternators are therefore fitted to recharge accumulators during the engine run.

Ultimately the electric power for the supercharger must be generated by the engine-driven electrical generator(s) whether they are direct-current generators or alternators - technically called alternating current generators - producing internal alternating current power which is internally rectified into direct current output.

All electricity storage components from batteries to capacitors are capable only of storing direct current. The conversion of engine mechanical power into electrical power for a supercharger that converts electrical power into mechanical power and then into "boost" is significantly less energy efficient than an engine-driven supercharger.

== Efficiency ==
The efficiency of an electric supercharger is curbed by several energy conversion losses (alternator for charging), damp energy while charging the accumulators and the compressor providing boost. The losses are in general higher than direct kinematic linkage of intake air compressor to engine crankshaft. If the vehicle implements kinetic energy recovery, then the battery can be charged on otherwise wasted energy.

== Electrically-assisted turbochargers ==
Electrically assisted turbochargers also use an electric motor to power the compressor; however in the case of the turbocharger, the traditional gas-driven turbocharger remains the primary power source, and the electric motor is used to reduce the turbo lag.

== Aftermarket scams ==
Several companies sell low-cost aftermarket products, claimed to be electric superchargers. These devices are typically simple ducted fans or blowers, often directly repurposed from marine and naval supplies, and are simply not capable of providing an intake manifold pressure increase, or a flow rate greater than what an engine draws. They can not measurably compress air or increase airflow, and instead draw electrical power and act as an obstruction for air flow to the engine. Usually, this leads to a slightly reduced power output, never an increased one. In order to increase performance in any automotive engine, a compressor must force (compress) a significantly greater volume of air into the engine than it would otherwise draw naturally. This requires a large amount of energy. An effective electric supercharging system requires additional batteries on board, and uses multi-horsepower electric motors and high-speed compression impellers similar to those used in exhaust-coupled turbochargers. Every psi of boost uses 6-7bhp from its power source, but many such kits use 12-volt battery system instead of 48-volt battery system used in the chargers for production vehicles, so the gain from a 12-volt kit is effectively cancelled.
