= Mercedes-AMG GT =

Sports car manufactured by Mercedes-AMG

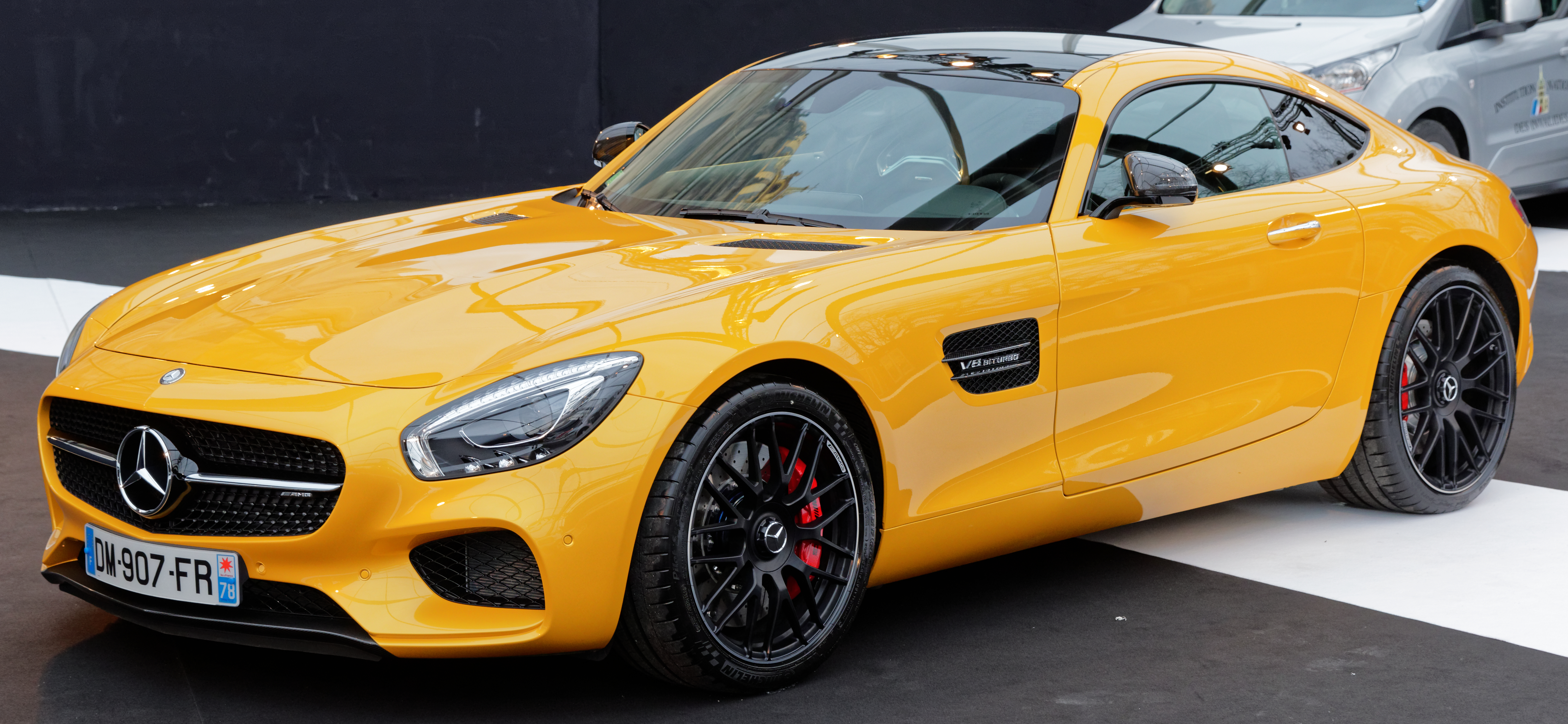

Overview
- Manufacturer: Mercedes-AMG
- Production: October 2014 – present
- Model years: 2015–present
- Assembly: Sindelfingen, Germany

Body and chassis
- Class: Sports car/grand tourer (S)

The Mercedes-AMG GT is a series of 2-door sports cars produced by German automobile manufacturer Mercedes-AMG. The car was introduced on 9 September 2014 and was officially unveiled to the public in October 2014 at the Paris Motor Show. While not directly replacing the SLS AMG (competing in a different segment), it is the second sports car developed entirely in-house by Mercedes-AMG. The Mercedes-AMG GT went on sale in two variants (GT and GT S) in March 2015, while a GT3 racing variant of the car was introduced in 2015. A high performance variant called the GT R was introduced in 2016. A GT4 racing variant, targeted at semi-professional drivers and based on the GT R variant, was introduced in 2017. In 2021, a new variant called the AMG GT R Black Series was released. All variants are assembled at the Mercedes-Benz plant in Sindelfingen, Germany.

In October 2021, Mercedes-Benz announced the new Mercedes-AMG R232 SL-Class as the direct successor for the roadster version. The second-generation coupe version of the GT, which was introduced nearly a year after the first-generation was discontinued, was redesigned on the same platform as the SL, but retains the name AMG GT.

== First generation (C190/R190) ==
First generation (C190/R190)
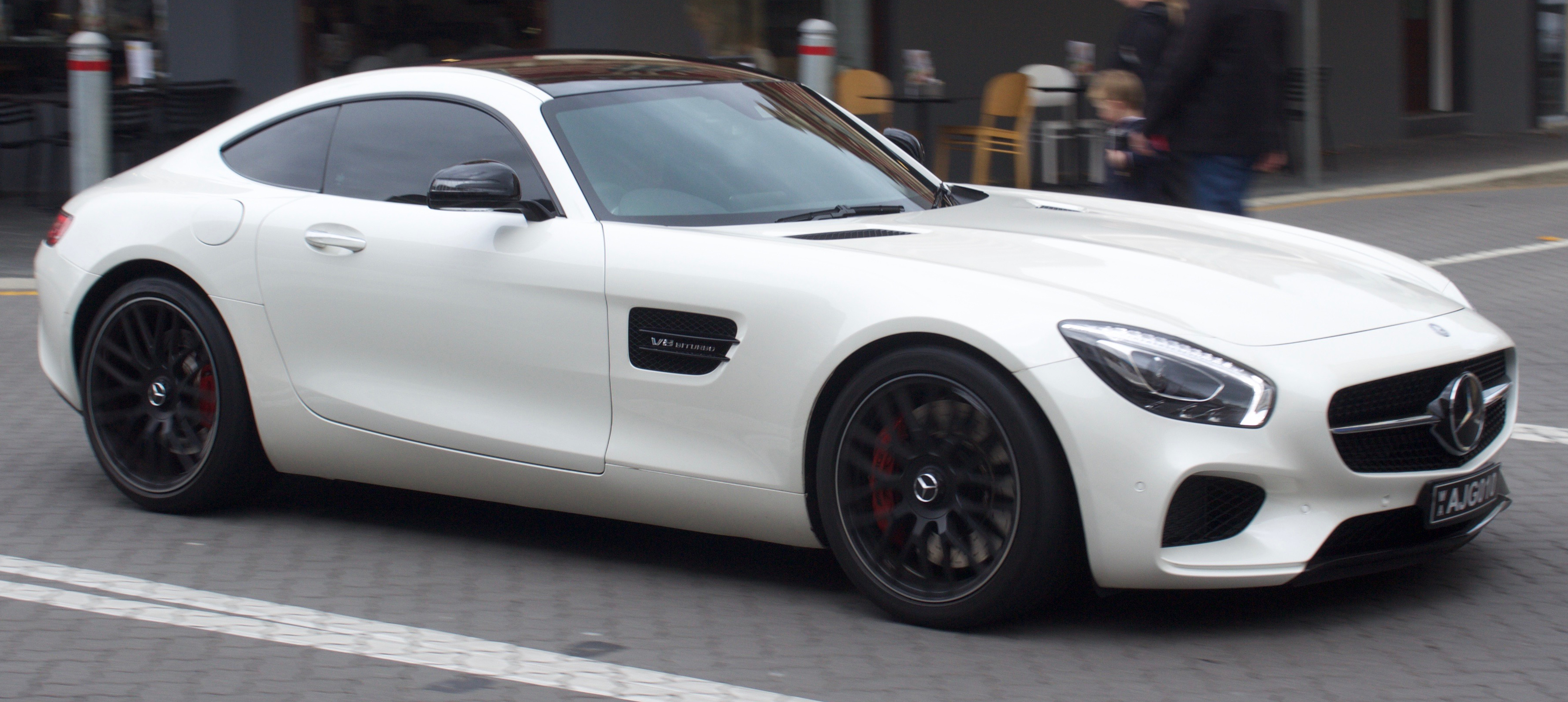

Overview
- Manufacturer: Mercedes-AMG
- Model code: C190 (Coupe); R190 (Roadster)
- Production: October 2014 – September 2022; 2021–2023 (AMG GT Black Series; 1,700 produced); 2022 (AMG GT Track Series; Limited 55 units)
- Model years: 2015–2023; 2021–2023 (AMG GT Black Series)
- Assembly: Sindelfingen, Germany
- Designer: Robert Lešnik, Gabriel Nemeth, Huey Lee, Mark Fetherston (exterior); Jan Kaul (interior)

Body and chassis
- Body style: 2-door liftback/fastback coupé; 2-door roadster
- Layout: Front mid-engine, rear-wheel-drive
- Platform: Mercedes-AMG Transaxle Spaceframe platform
- Related: Mercedes-Benz SLS AMG

Powertrain
- Engine: 4.0 L M178 (Mercedes-AMG) twin-turbocharged V8; 6.2 L M159 V8 (AMG GT3)
- Transmission: 7-speed AMG SPEEDSHIFT DCT 7G-Tronic dual-clutch

Dimensions
- Wheelbase: 2,630 mm (103.5 in)
- Length: 4,546 mm (179.0 in)
- Width: 1,939 mm (76.3 in) (GT, GT S); 2,007 mm (79.0 in) (GT C, GT R)
- Height: 1,288 mm (50.7 in)
- Kerb weight: 1,554–1,645 kg (3,426–3,627 lb)

Chronology
- Successor: Mercedes-AMG SL-Class (R232) (Roadster)

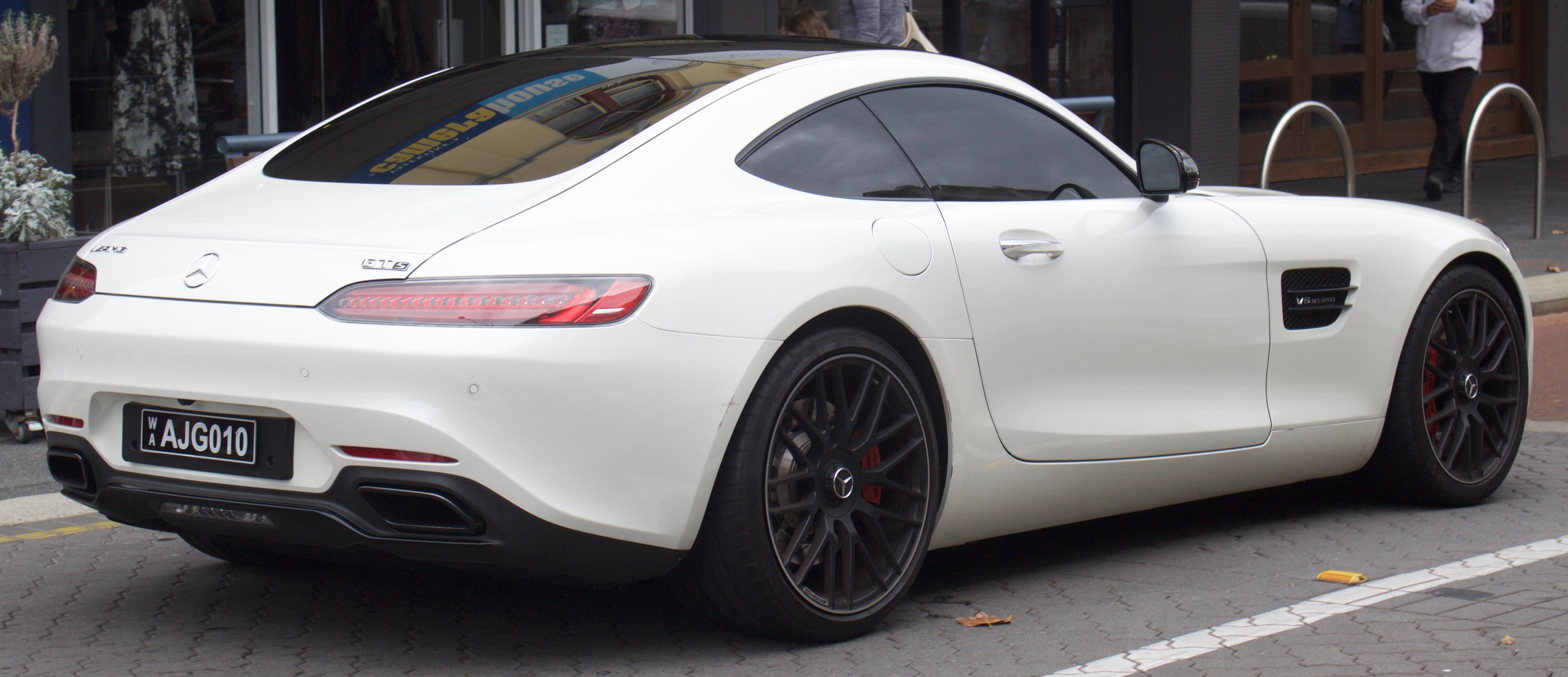
Mercedes-AMG GT S

The interior of the Mercedes-AMG GT was previewed on 16 April 2014. The car made its debut on 9 September 2014 and was officially unveiled to the public in October 2014 at the Paris Motor Show. The GT's exterior design was kept similar to that of the preceding SLS AMG, with wide wheel arches, lower bodywork, and fastback sloping roofline of the SLS AMG, but using conventional forward-opening doors instead of the iconic gullwing style pioneered by the 300 SL in the 1950s. It also employed an upgraded and shortened version of the Transaxle Spaceframe platform used by the SLS.

The vehicle structure is made up of 93% aluminium, with the front module base made up of magnesium. The exterior lead designer was Mark Fetherston, whose previous works include the W176 A-Class, the CLA-Class, and SLS AMG. The interior, designed by Jan Kaul, features a large centre console and decorative elements in a leather and carbon polymer design. The trunk offers room for a medium-sized suitcase.

Two engine power output options were offered: the GT, with 340 kW (462 PS; 456 hp), and the GT S with 375 kW (510 PS; 503 hp). The GT generates 600 N⋅m (443 lb⋅ft) of torque, and the GT S generates 650 N⋅m (479 lb⋅ft) of torque.

Shortly after its introduction, Mercedes-AMG CEO at the time, Tobias Moers, promised a Black Series variant of the Mercedes-AMG GT. The new high performance variant was called the AMG GT R.

=== 2017 facelift ===
The Mercedes-AMG family was given a facelift in 2017, along with the introduction of the GT C roadster variant and the Edition 50 model, which is a limited-edition derivative of the GT C variant. The key improvements made as part of the facelift include increased power output from the M178 engine for the GT and GT S variants (10 kW and 9 kW respectively) and the inclusion of the 'Panamericana' grille from the GT3, GT4 and GT R variants as standard equipment for all variants.

=== Specifications and performance ===
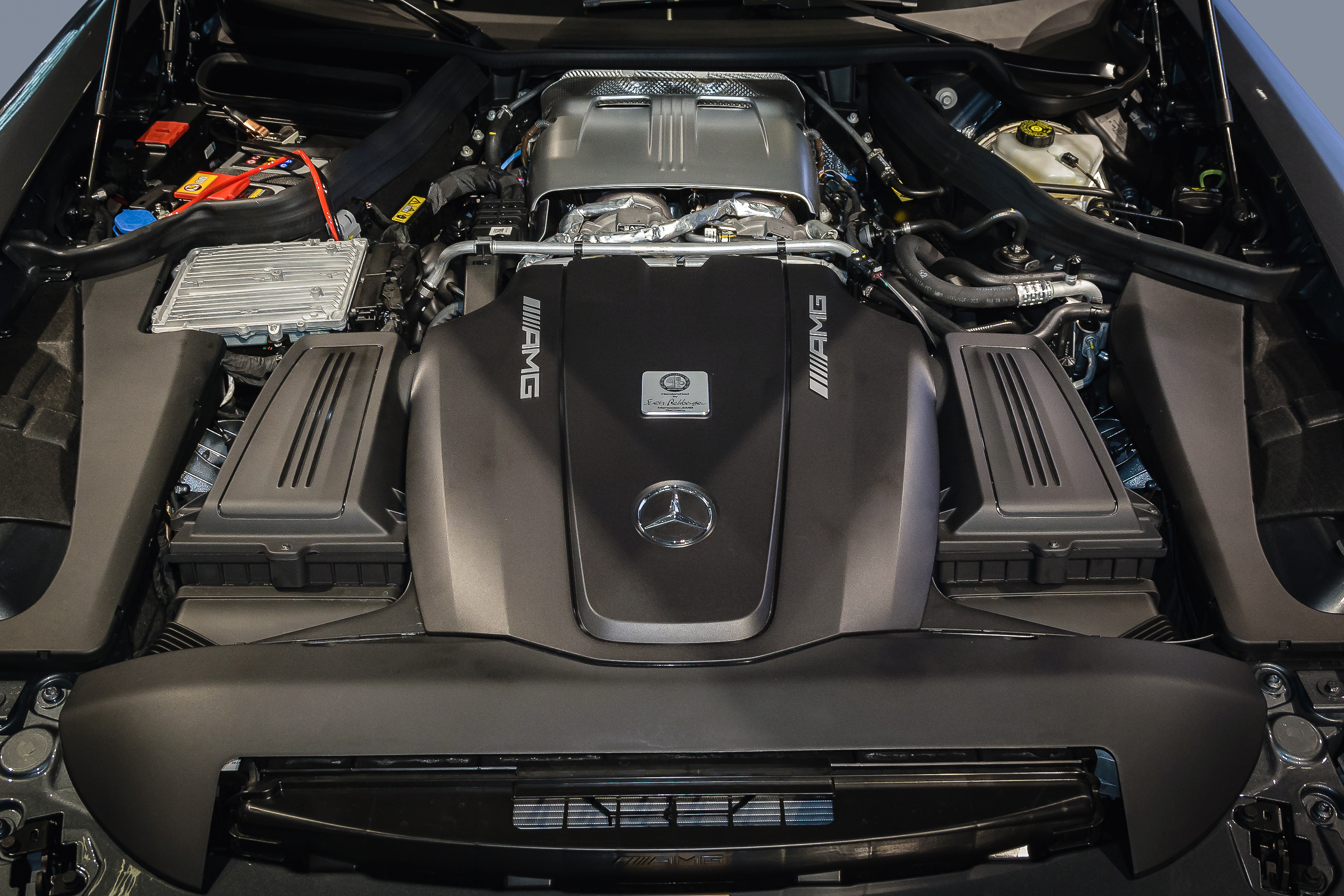
The M178 V8 engine in a GT. The turbochargers are visible in the centre, beneath a metallic heat shield.

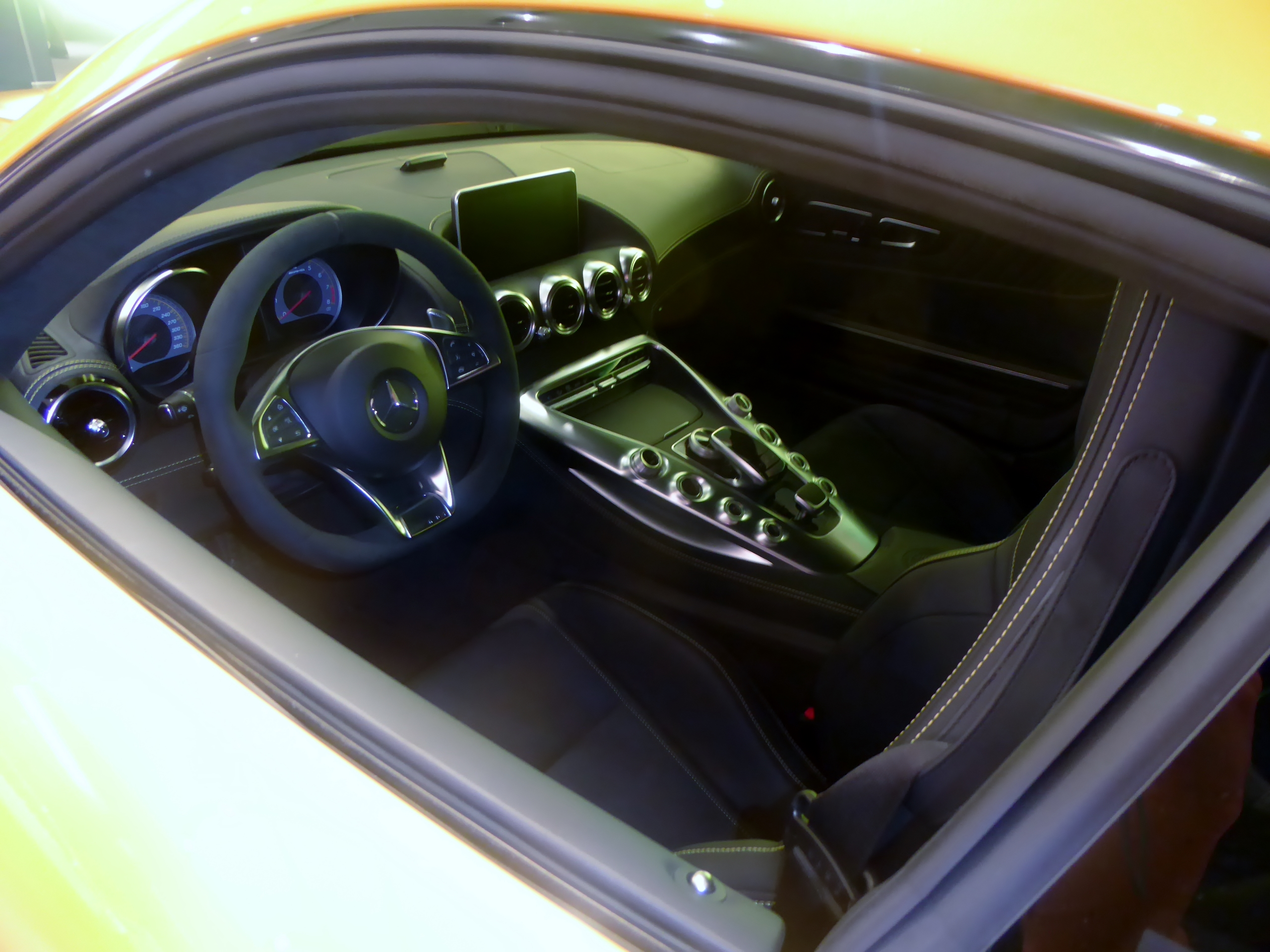
Mercedes-AMG GT S (C190) interior

The GT uses a front mid-engine, rear-wheel-drive layout, with the engine positioned inside the vehicle's wheelbase (behind the front axis). The spaceframe chassis and body are made out of aluminum alloys, while the trunk lid is made of steel and the hood is made of magnesium. The suspension system is a double wishbone unit at the front and rear, with forged aluminium wishbones and hub carriers.

The car is powered by a 4.0-litre M178 twin-turbocharged V8 engine. The engine has a "hot vee" configuration (exhaust manifolds and turbochargers between the cylinder banks) to reduce turbo lag, and uses dry-sump lubrication. Power is sent to the rear wheels through a seven-speed AMG SPEEDSHIFT dual-clutch transmission; the GT S variant employs an electronically controlled mechanical limited-slip differential. In a road test executed by Car and Driver, the GT S accelerated from 0–97 km/h (60 mph) in 3.0 seconds, completed the quarter mile in 11.2 seconds and attained a top speed of 311 km/h (193 mph).

=== Variants ===
==== F1 Safety Car ====
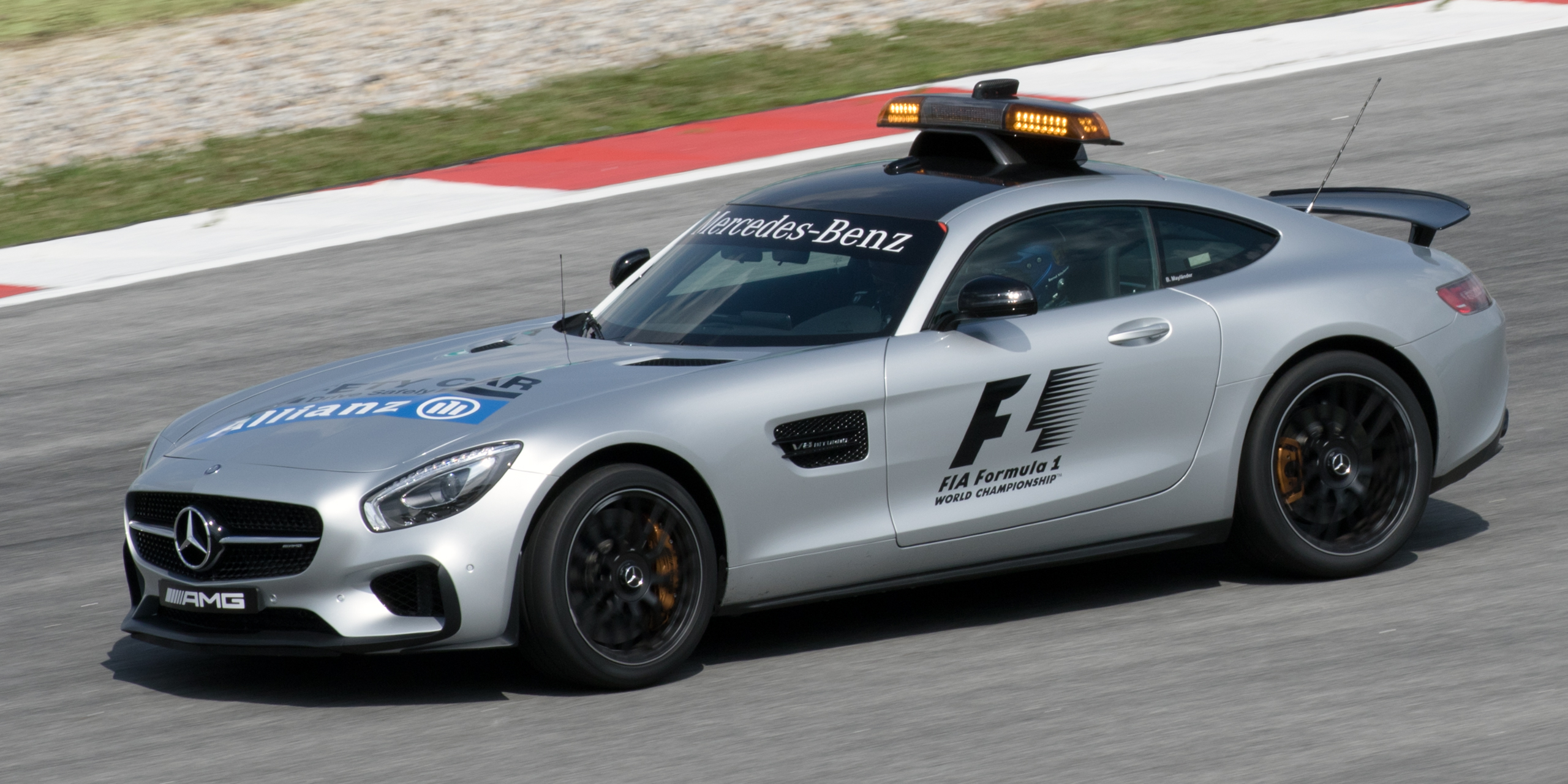
Mercedes-AMG GT S Formula 1 safety car

The GT S was the Formula 1 safety car for the 2015, 2016 and 2017 seasons, having made its debut in that role at the 2015 Australian Grand Prix. The GT R was used as F1's safety car from 2018 to 2021. The Black Series was used as F1's safety car from 2022 to 2026.

==== Mercedes-AMG GT (2015–2021) ====
The GT is the entry level variant of the Mercedes-AMG GT family. The M178 engine in this variant is tuned to an output of 340 kW (462 PS; 456 hp) and 601 N⋅m (443 lb⋅ft) of torque, with the key differences between this and its more expensive siblings being a mechanical limited-slip differential, an absorbent glass mat battery, the lack of the "Race Mode" setting in the AMG Dynamic Select adaptive drivetrain system, the lack of the AMG Ride Control adaptive suspensive system, and a passive AMG Sport Exhaust System. Keyless-Go is also an optional feature, as opposed to standard equipment. The GT is equipped with 19-inch wheels at the front and rear.

==== Mercedes-AMG GT S (2015–2020) ====
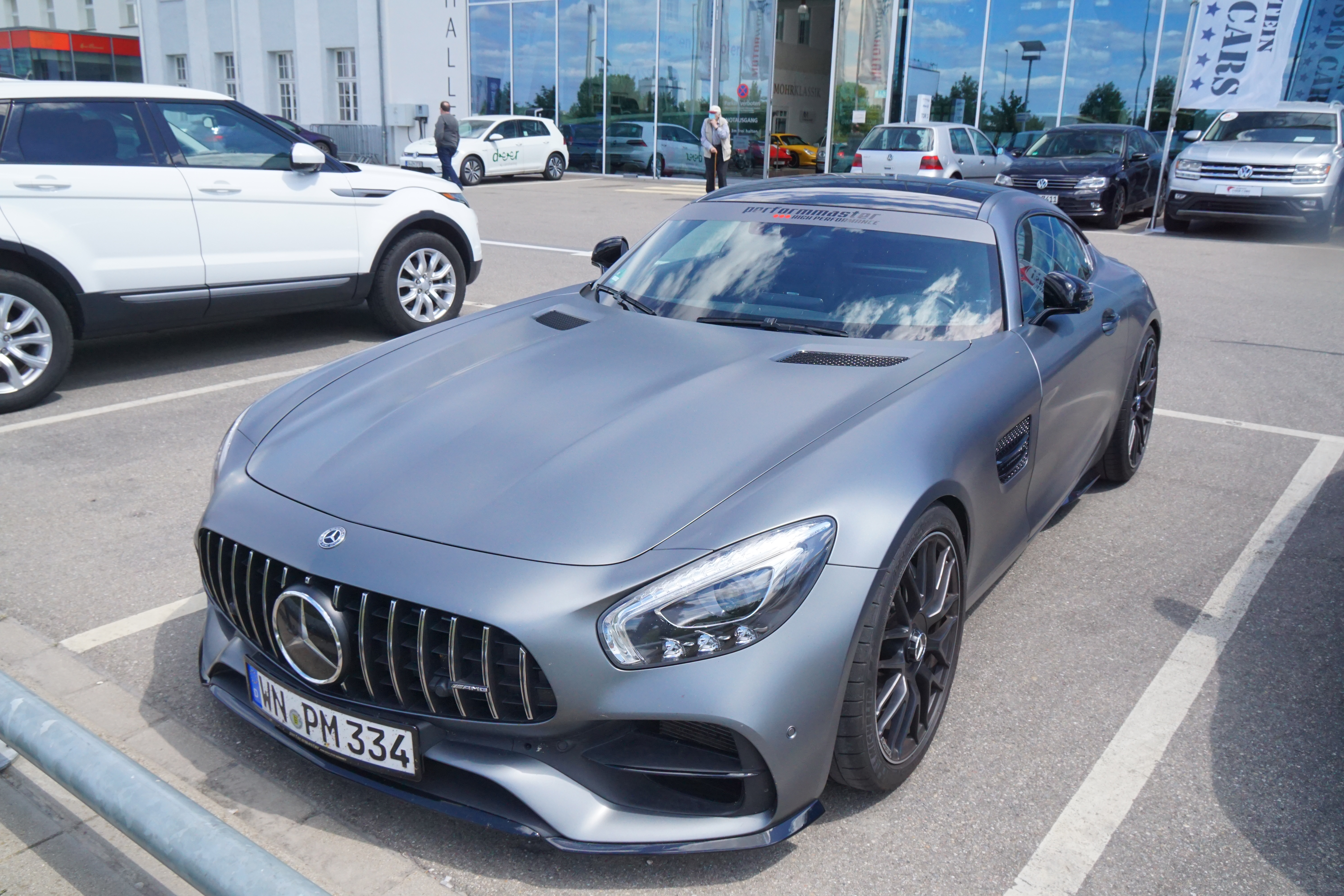
Mercedes-AMG GT S

The GT S is a more highly equipped variant of the Mercedes-AMG GT. The M178 engine in this variant is tuned to an output of 375 kW (510 PS; 503 hp) and 651 N⋅m (480 lb⋅ft) of torque. The key mechanical differences the GT S gains over the GT include an electronically controlled limited-slip differential, "Race Mode" and "Race Start" mode settings in the AMG Dynamic Select adaptive drivetrain system, AMG Ride Control adaptive suspensive system, an AMG Performance Exhaust System with dynamic flaps, and a lithium-ion battery. Keyless-Go is standard equipment, as is a staggered set of wheels (19-inch at the front, 20-inch at the rear).

As with many other recent Mercedes-AMGs, at the time of introduction a limited production "Edition 1" series was issued of the GT S. 375 examples were sold worldwide, and include a gloss black aerodynamic set including a front splitter, lower wheelwell extensions, a carbon fibre roof, a fixed rear wing, red interior accents and red brake calipers, and various other extras.

==== Mercedes-AMG GT C (2017–2021) ====
The GT C is a performance oriented variant of the Mercedes-AMG GT. The M178 engine in this variant is tuned to an output of 410 kW (557 PS; 550 hp) and 502 lb⋅ft (681 N⋅m) of torque. While the GT C retains the key mechanical differences the GT S gains over the GT, it also has a wider body (2,007 mm (79 in)) and active rear steering, which the GT S does not have (even as options). In the United, States, the Lane Tracking and AMG Dynamic Plus option packages are standard equipment on the GT C.

A limited-edition model, the Edition 50, was released as part of the debut of the GT C variant at the 2017 Detroit Auto Show. The Edition 50 features: a choice of two shades of matte paint known as designo Graphite Grey Magno and designo Cashmere White Magno; black chrome exterior trim, headlight surrounds and forged / cross-spoke wheels; a two-tone silver pearl or black against grey quilted-leather interior which features a micro-suede wrapped steering wheel; and, "Edition 50" and "1 of 500" lettering on the steering wheel bezel and 12 o'clock mark in silver pearl. In the United, States, the Edition 50 is limited in production to 50 coupes and 50 roadsters. Globally, the Edition 50 is limited to 500 units, which explains the "1 of 500" on the steering wheel.

==== Mercedes-AMG GT R (2017–2021) ====
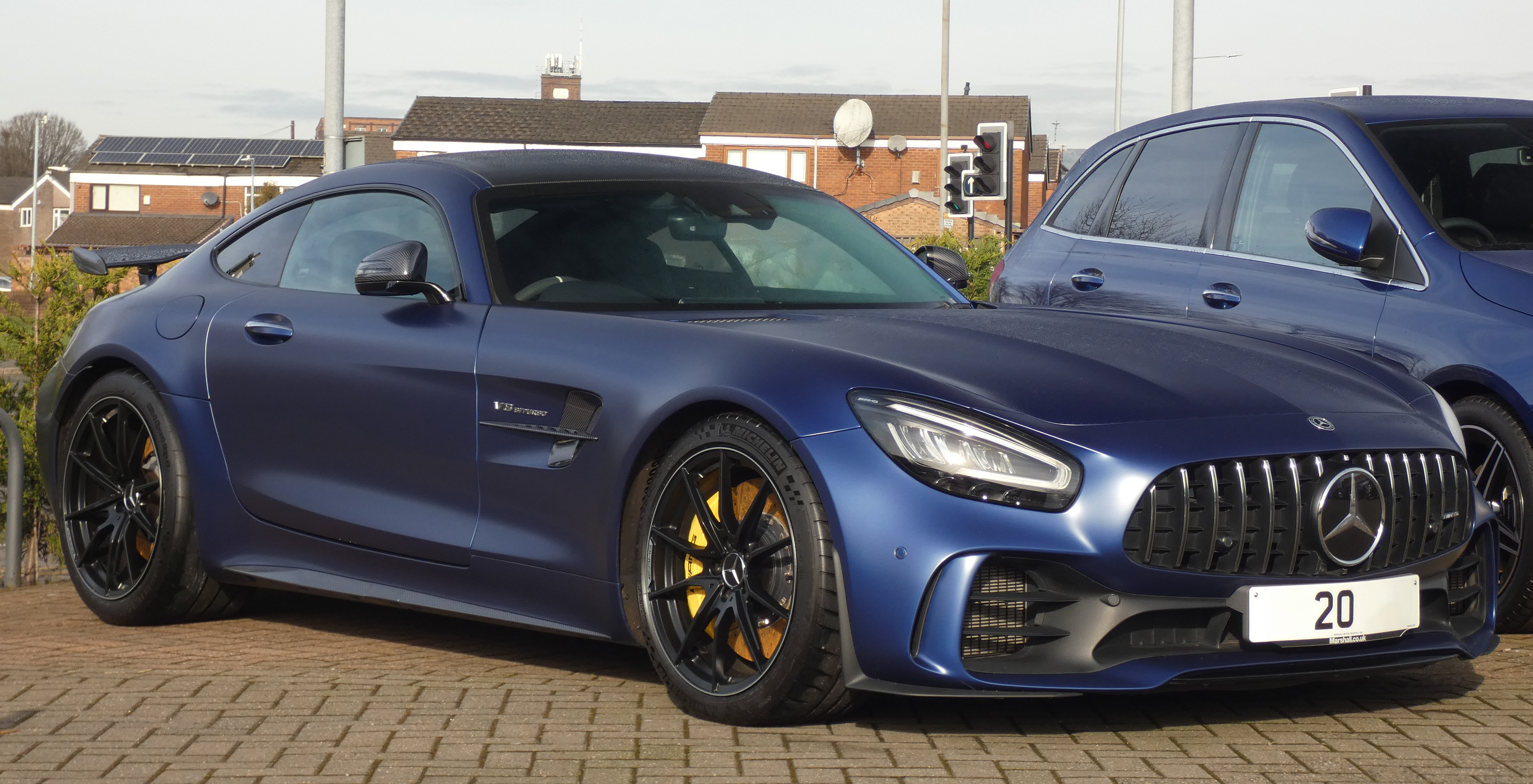
Mercedes-AMG GT R

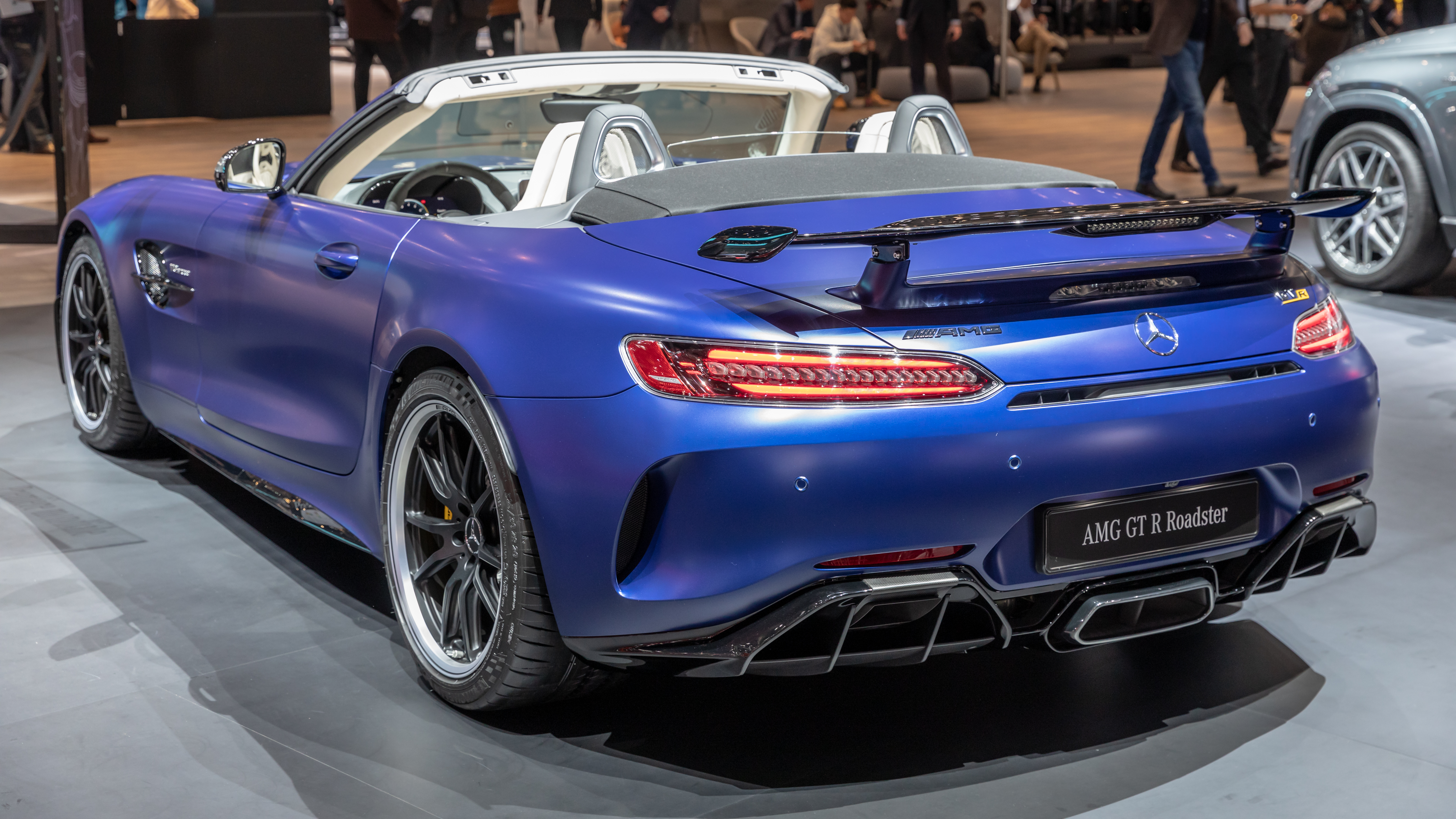
Mercedes-AMG GT R Roadster at the 2019 Geneva International Motor Show

The GT R is a high-performance variant of the Mercedes-AMG GT and was introduced at the Goodwood Festival of Speed on 24 June 2016. The M178 engine in this variant is tuned to an output of 430 kW (585 PS; 577 hp) at 6,250 rpm and 700 N⋅m (516 lb⋅ft) of torque at 5,500 rpm. The GT R accelerates from 0 to 100 km/h (62 mph) in 3.6 seconds and has a claimed top speed of 319 km/h (198 mph).

While the GT R retains the key mechanical differences the GT C gains over the GT S, it also gains manually adjustable coilover springs (in conjunction with the AMG Ride Control suspension of the base models), an active underbody fairing, a manually adjustable rear wing, and a 9-mode AMG Traction Control system. The GT R also loses Keyless-Go, the integrated garage-door opener, the heated and power-folding side mirrors, the auto-dimming interior and exterior mirrors, and reverts to the basic light-weight 4-speaker audio system that the GT comes with, but these features can still be added as options.

When it was launched, the GT R had several cosmetic changes compared with the standard car, notably the vertical slats in the front grille, an adjustable rear wing, new front air intakes and new front and rear diffusers. The styling of the GT R is more comparable to that of the AMG GT3 race car. However, the base GT variant gained several of these cosmetic changes as part of a mild facelift in the 2017 model year. The GT R went on sale in November 2016, with deliveries beginning in 2017. For the 2018 Formula One World Championship, the GT R became the official Formula 1 safety car. During the 2020 Tuscan Grand Prix, the Safety Car ran a red livery rather than the traditional silver to commemorate Scuderia Ferrari's 1,000th Grand Prix start. For the 2021 F1 season, the GT R Safety Car permanently wears a red livery (along with the Mercedes F1 Team's sponsor CrowdStrike) rather than the traditional silver to increase the chances of drivers seeing the Safety Car in poor visibility. It will also share the role with the Aston Martin Vantage.

It completed a lap of the Nürburgring Nordschleife track in 7:10.92, in a test conducted by German magazine Sport Auto, making it the fastest rear wheel driven road-legal production car around the track at the time and the 5th fastest lap time for a road-legal production vehicle around the track at the time.

A roadster version was introduced in March 2019 and would be limited to 750 units. It was discontinued in 2021 when the Black Edition was released which it replaced.

==== Mercedes-AMG GT R Pro (2019–2020) ====
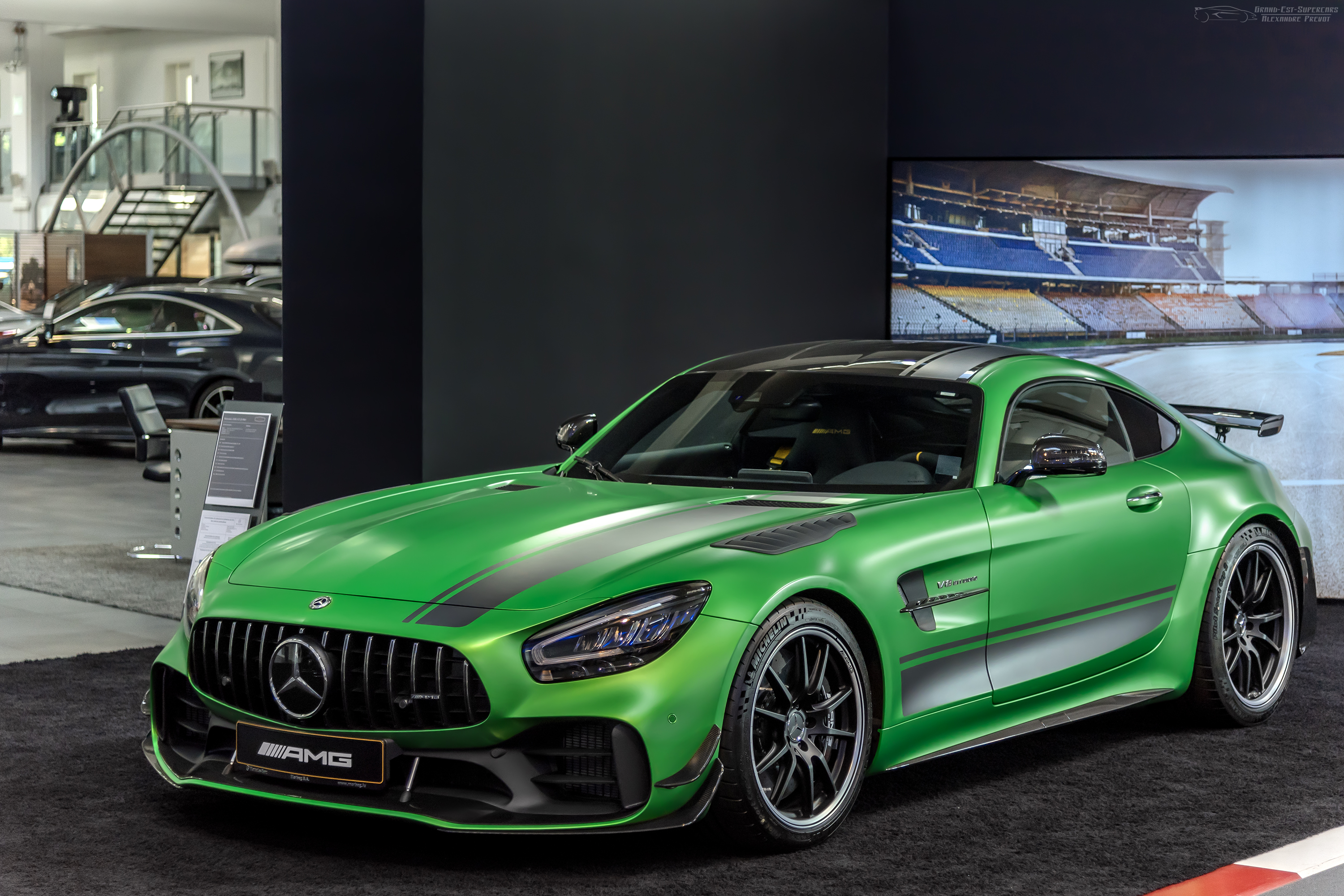
Mercedes-AMG GT R Pro

Mercedes-AMG introduced the GT R Pro at the 2018 Los Angeles Auto Show. The GT R Pro is a more track focused variant of the AMG GT line up and based on the GT R. This variant would be limited for 750 units worldwide with a starting price tag of USD $200,645. The GT R Pro retains all key mechanical differences of the GT R gains over the GT C with other minor upgrades. The GT R Pro uses the same engine, with the same power output, as the GT R, which is rated at 430 kW (585 PS; 577 hp) at 6,250 rpm and 700 N⋅m (516 lb⋅ft) of torque at 5,500 rpm. It also retains the same 0 to 100 km/h (62 mph) time of 3.6 seconds and top speed of 319 km/h (198 mph).

New upgrades includes, new manually adjustable coil-over suspension setup, lightweight anti-roll bars, electronically controlled dynamic engine and transmission mounts, GT R's optional carbon-fiber roof and carbon ceramic brakes became standard, new carbon-fibre bucket seats, lightweight forged wheels 19-inch on front and 20-inch on rear which were exclusive for the GT R Pro, same Michelin Pilot Sport Cup 2 semi-slick tires which were also used in the GT R, new carbon-fibre braced active aerodynamic front splitter and canards, new front fenders with GT3 inspired vents, new rear diffuser with canards, new side skirts, updated rear wing with a small gurney for increase downforce while reducing weight.

Interior upgrades includes, a 10.25-inch digital instrument binnacle and infotainment system, a Burmester surround sound system, keyless go and parking assist. On exterior, new racing stripes offered in Gloss Light Green when combined with the Selenite Gray Magno color exterior, or stripes in Matte Dark Gray with all other exterior colors. The unique accent stripes can also offered for the GT R Pro.

For the GT R Pro, Mercedes-AMG also offered an optional track package which adds a full steel roll-cage, four-point harnesses and a 2 kg fire extinguisher. With all these upgrades curb weight has been reduced by 25 kg (55 lb), and with track package equipped 40 kg (88 lb) of weight reduced over the GT R.

In November 2018, Mercedes-AMG conducted a test at Nürburgring Nordschleife for the new GT R Pro, and the car completed a lap time, driven by Maro Engel, set a lap time of 7:04.632 minutes around the track, making it the 8th fastest lap time for a road-legal production vehicle around the track at the time.

==== Mercedes-AMG GT and GT C Roadster (2017–2021) ====
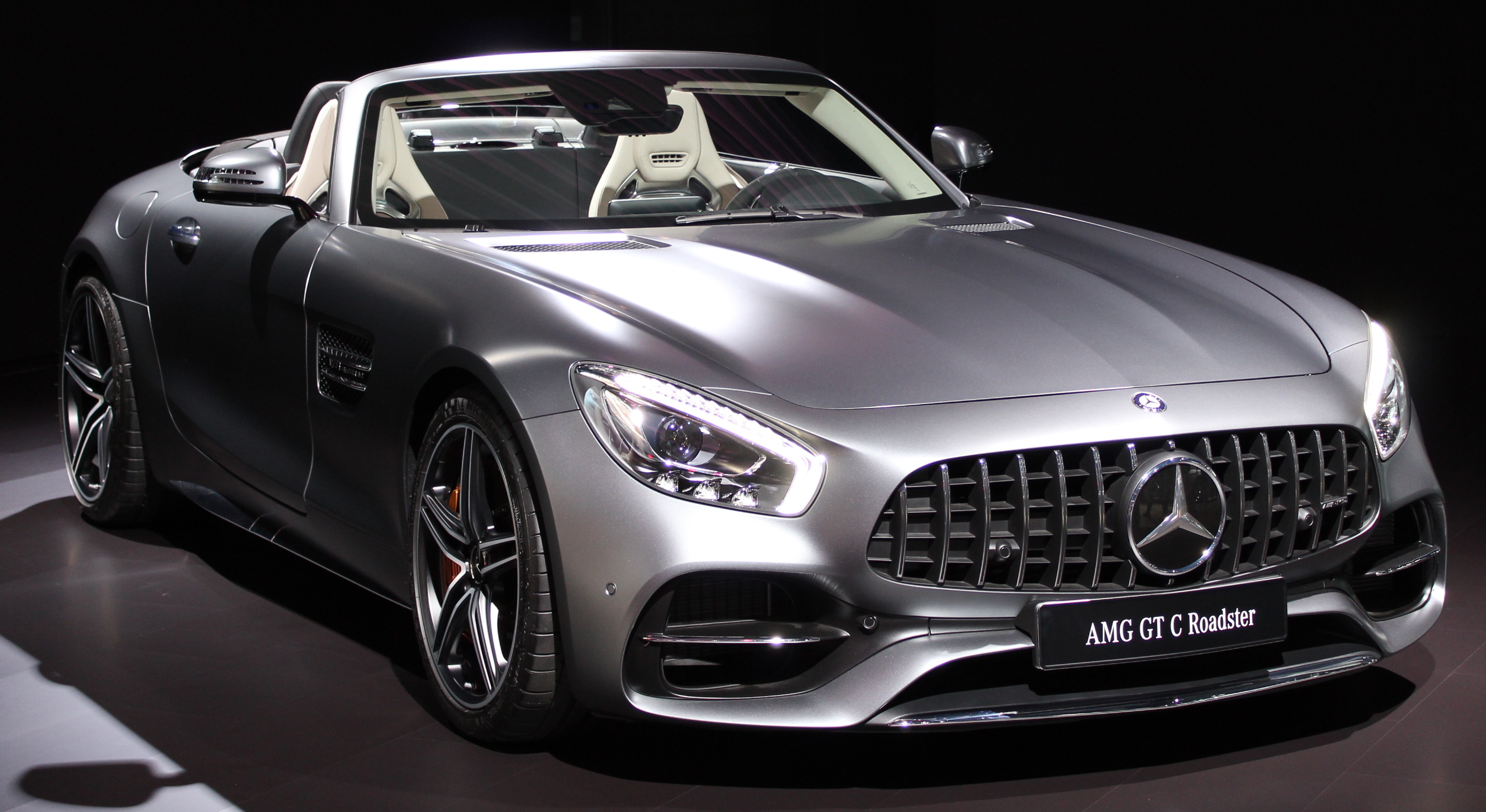
Mercedes-AMG GT C Roadster

The GT and GT C roadsters are the roadster versions of the GT and GT C coupés, and were announced shortly after the introduction of the GT R variant. Both variants made their debut at the 2016 Paris Motor Show. The GT and GT C roadsters utilise the active air management system found on the GT R variant to help with cooling and airflow performance. The GT C roadster retains the wider bodywork of the GT C coupé, and the GT roadster has a slightly higher first and lower seventh gear with a longer final drive compared to the GT coupé. The GT and GT C roadsters feature a three-layer fabric roof built around an aluminum, magnesium and steel structure, available in black, red or beige, and which can open and close in 11 seconds up to speeds of 50 km/h (31 mph). The GT C roadster, like the GT C coupé, has a limited "Edition 50" model, celebrating AMG's 50 years of existence.

==== Mercedes-AMG GT Dark Night Edition (2021) ====
Mercedes-AMG official announced that its AMG GT Black Series and AMG GT Dark night officially listed special edition models, Mercedes-AMG GT models launched a total of 2, The prices are US$576,612 and $229,594.

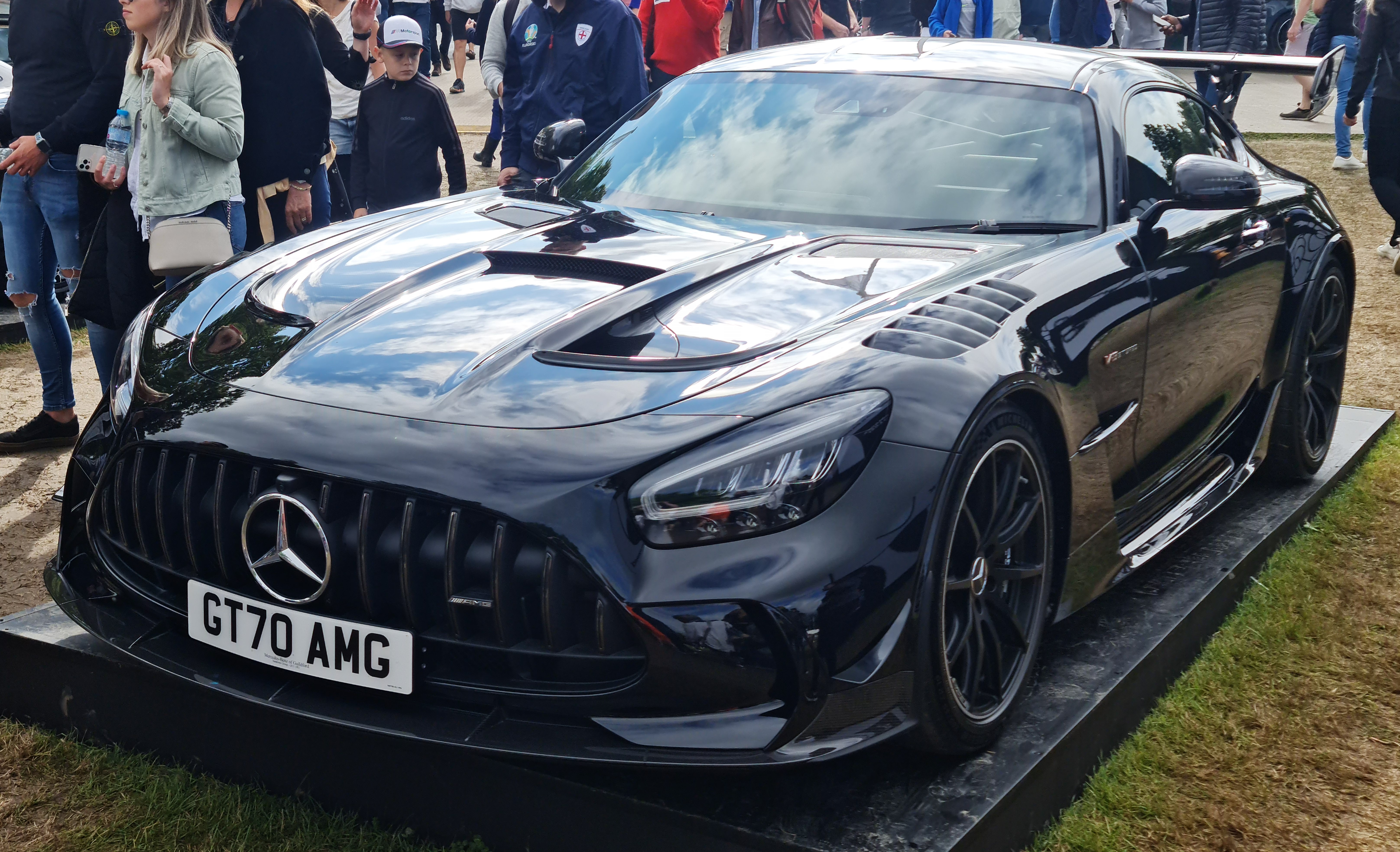
Mercedes-AMG GT Black Series at the 2021 Goodwood FOS

==== Mercedes-AMG GT Black Series (2021–2023) ====
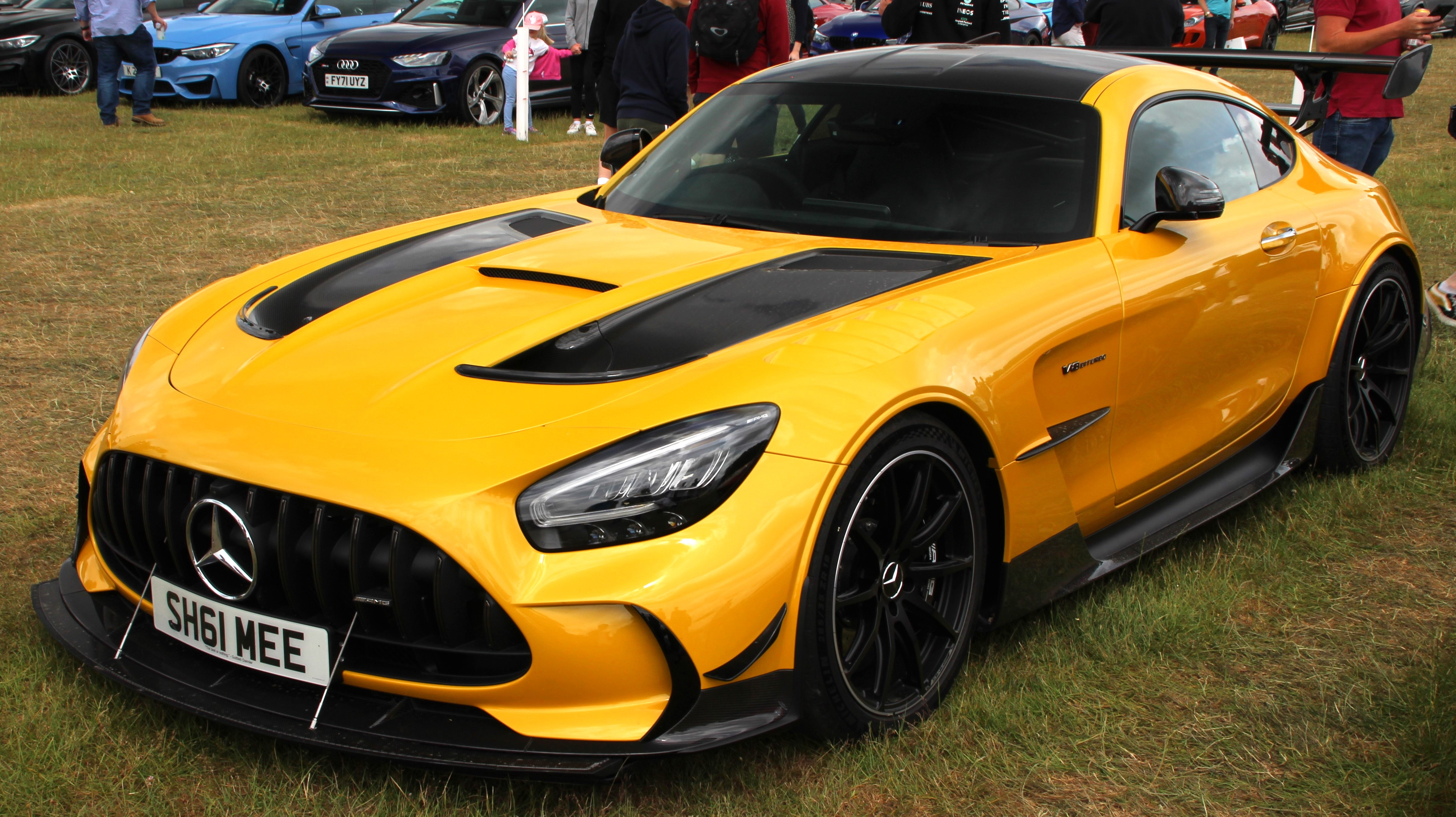
Mercedes-AMG GT Black Series at the 2022 Goodwood FOS

The GT Black Series is a high-performance variant of the Mercedes-AMG GT and was officially revealed on Mercedes-AMG's YouTube channel on 9 July 2020. The M178 engine in this variant is tuned to an output of 537 kW (730 PS; 720 hp) at 6,700–6,900 rpm and 800 N⋅m (590 lb⋅ft) of torque at 2,000–6,000 rpm. Referred to as the M178 LS2, the engine has a slightly higher redline at 7,200 rpm compared to the GT R's 7,000 rpm, and uses a flat-plane crankshaft instead of a cross-plane crankshaft, turning out in different firing order. Additionally, the M178 LS2 uses a smaller compressor wheel, resulting in an increase in boost from the GT R's 135 to 170 kPa (19.6 to 24.6 psi). The GT Black Series accelerates from 0 to 100 km/h (62 mph) in 3.2 seconds and has a claimed top speed of 325 km/h (202 mph).

The suspension is unique, with a carbon-fibre anti-roll bar with two adjustment settings for the front axle, and an iron anti-roll bar with three adjustment settings for the rear axle. Like previous Black Series vehicles, the camber is manually adjustable for both the front and rear axles. Handling has been improved with carbon-fibre panels at the front and rear, as well as carbon-ceramic brake rotors and Black Series specific brake pads. The wing has an active aero flap, and contributes to a total maximum downforce of more than 400 kg (882 lb) at 249 km/h (155 mph). The Michelin Pilot Cup 2 R tires are specific to the car, and are available in M01A soft and M02 hard compounds.

Carbon-fibre is used extensively for most of the body, including the hood, roof, hatch and underbody. The exterior gains an enlarged grille based on the Mercedes-AMG GT3, as well as bigger air outlets, a manually adjustable front splitter and an upgraded rear wing as part of a major aerodynamic upgrade. The interior features standard AMG performance bucket seats, and uses microfiber for the steering wheel, door and instrument panels.

On 4 November 2020, the GT Black Series recorded a lap time of 6:43.616 with Maro Engel behind the wheel at the Nürburgring Nordschleife, making it the fastest lap time ever recorded for a road-legal production vehicle around the track at the time.

==== Mercedes-AMG GT Track Series (2023) ====
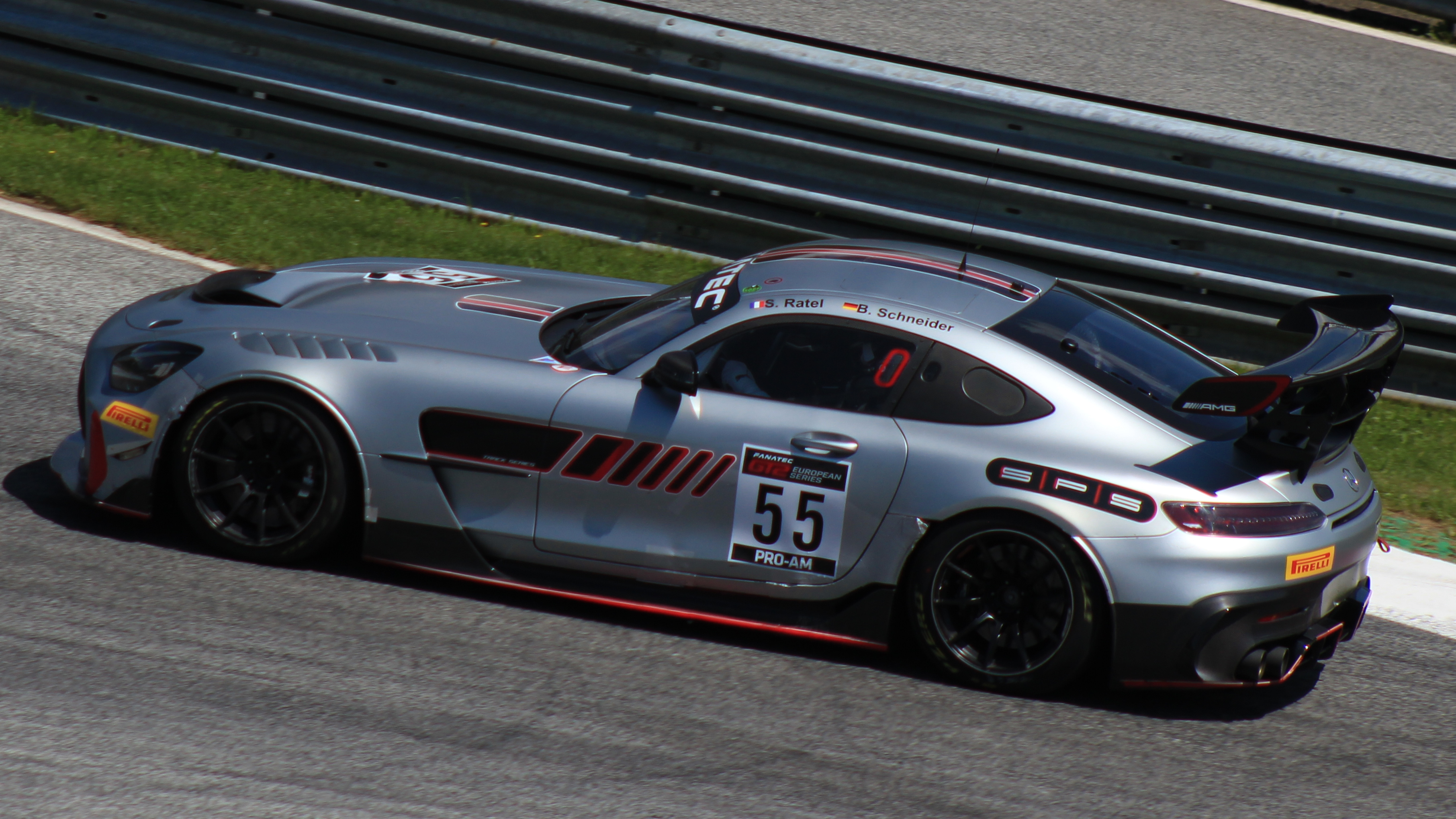
AMG GT Track Series raced by SPS Automotive Performance as an invitation entry in the 2022 GT2 European Series

In 2022, Mercedes-AMG launched the AMG GT Track Series, a track-only car based on the AMG GT Black Series. The car was created to celebrate the 55th anniversary of AMG, and thus only 55 models will be sold. A single one of these cars raced as an invitational entry at the Red Bull Ring in the 2022 GT2 European Series.

==== Mercedes-AMG GT3 Edition 55 (2023–2024) ====
Only 5 units of the Mercedes-AMG GT3 Edition 55 were sold, each costing €625,000.

Mercedes-AMG manufacturer's data
Model	Year of introduction	Engine	Power (at rpm)	Torque (at rpm)	CO_{2}	Fuel consumption	Acceleration 0–100 km/h (0–62 mph) (seconds)	Top speed
GT	2015	M178; 3,982 cc (243.0 cu in) twin-turbocharged V8 petrol engine	340 kW (462 PS; 456 hp) at 6,000	600 N⋅m (443 lbf⋅ft) at 1,600–5,000	216 g/km	9.3 L/100 km (25 mpg_{‑US})	4.0	300 km/h (186 mph)
GT S	2015	M178; 3,982 cc (243.0 cu in) twin-turbocharged V8 petrol engine	375 kW (510 PS; 503 hp) at 6,250	650 N⋅m (479 lbf⋅ft) at 1,750–4,750	219 g/km	9.4 L/100 km (25 mpg_{‑US})	3.8	310 km/h (193 mph)
GT R / GT R Pro	2017	M178; 3,982 cc (243.0 cu in) twin-turbocharged V8 petrol engine	430 kW (585 PS; 577 hp) at 6,250	700 N⋅m (516 lbf⋅ft) at 1,900-5,500	259 g/km	11.4 L/100 km (20.6 mpg_{‑US})	3.6	318 km/h (198 mph)
GT Roadster	2017	M178; 3,982 cc (243.0 cu in) twin-turbocharged V8 petrol engine	350 kW (476 PS; 469 hp) at 6,000	630 N⋅m (465 lbf⋅ft) at 1,700-5,000	219 g/km	9.4 L/100 km (25 mpg_{‑US})	4.0	302 km/h (188 mph)
GT C Roadster	2017	M178; 3,982 cc (243.0 cu in) twin-turbocharged V8 petrol engine	410 kW (557 PS; 550 hp) at 5,750-6,750	680 N⋅m (502 lbf⋅ft) at 1,900-6,750	259 g/km	11.4 L/100 km (20.6 mpg_{‑US})	3.7	317 km/h (197 mph)
GT Facelift	2017	M178; 3,982 cc (243.0 cu in) twin-turbocharged V8 petrol engine	350 kW (476 PS; 469 hp) at 6,000	630 N⋅m (465 lbf⋅ft) at 1,700–5,000	224-216 g/km	9.3 L/100 km (25 mpg_{‑US})	4.0	304 km/h (189 mph)
GT S Facelift	2017	M178; 3,982 cc (243.0 cu in) twin-turbocharged V8 petrol engine	384 kW (522 PS; 515 hp) at 6,250	670 N⋅m (494 lbf⋅ft) at 1,800-5,000	224-219 g/km	9.4 L/100 km (25 mpg_{‑US})	3.8	310 km/h (193 mph)
GT Coupe and Roadster Second Facelift	2020	M178; 3,982 cc (243.0 cu in) twin-turbocharged V8 petrol engine	390 kW (530 PS; 523 hp) at 5,500–6,750 rpm	670 N⋅m (494 lb⋅ft) at 2,100–5,250 rpm	296–297 g/km	12.9–13.0 L/100 km	3.8	314 km/h (194 mph)
GT Black Series	2021	M178 LS2; 3,982 cc (243.0 cu in) twin-turbocharged V8 petrol engine	537 kW (730 PS; 720 hp) at 6,700-6,900	800 N⋅m (590 lbf⋅ft) at 2,000-6,000	292 g/km	12.8 L/100 km	3.2	325 km/h (202 mph)
GT Track Series	2022	M178 LS2; 3,982 cc (243.0 cu in) twin-turbocharged V8 petrol engine	540 kW (734 PS; 724 hp) at 6,700-6,900	850 N⋅m (627 lbf⋅ft) at 2,000-6,000	N/A	N/A	N/A	N/A
GT3	2016	M159; 6,208 cc (378.8 cu in) naturally aspirated V8 petrol engine	542 hp (550 PS; 404 kW)	650 N⋅m (479 lbf⋅ft)	N/A	N/A	3.0	332 km/h (206 mph)
GT3 Evo	2020	M159; 6,208 cc (378.8 cu in) naturally aspirated V8 petrol engine	542 hp (550 PS; 404 kW)	650 N⋅m (479 lbf⋅ft)	N/A	N/A	N/A	
GT4	2017	M178; 3,982 cc (243.0 cu in) twin-turbocharged V8 petrol engine	Up to 375 kW (510 PS; 503 hp)	Up to 600 N⋅m (443 lbf⋅ft)	N/A	N/A	N/A	3.6

== Second generation (C192) ==
Second generation (C192)
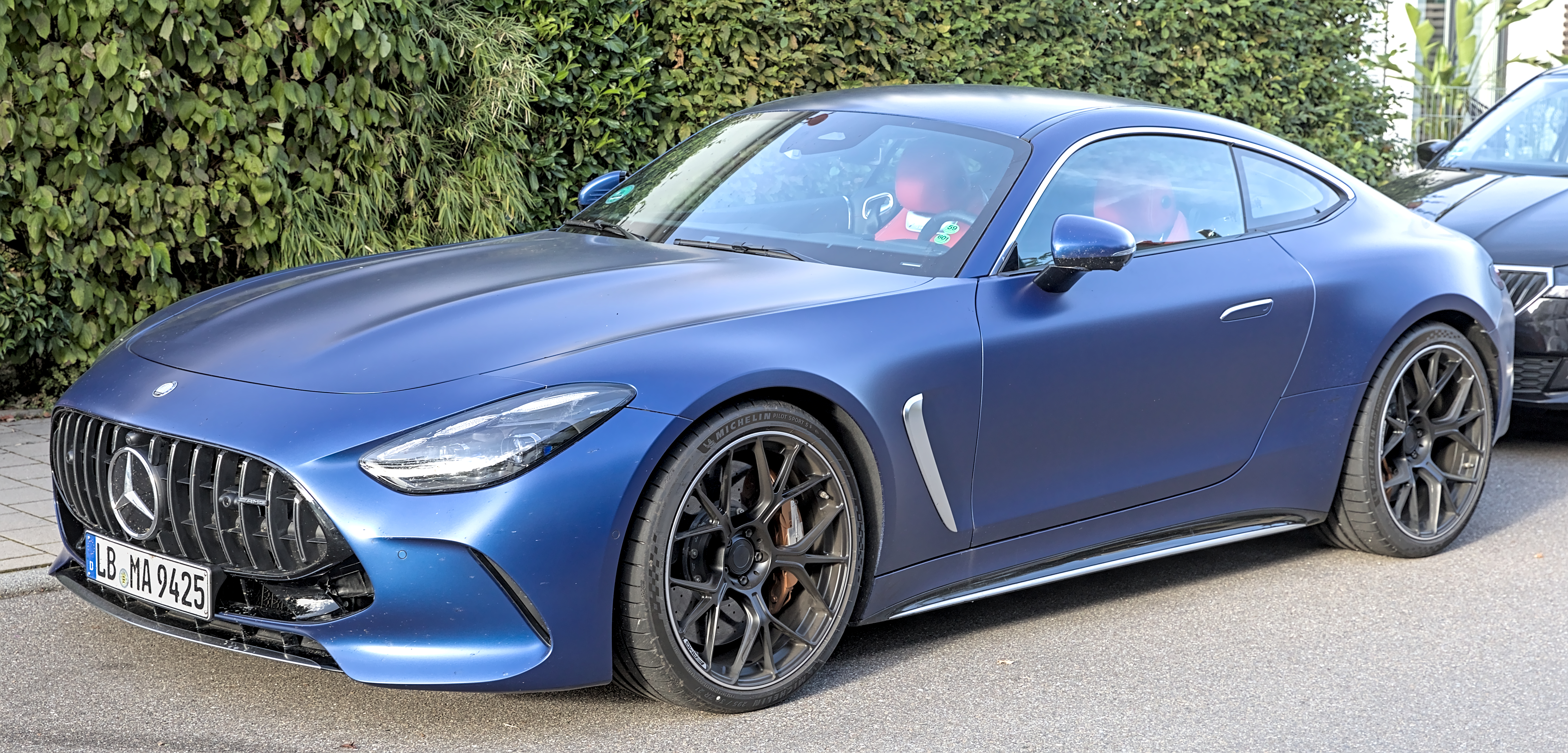

Overview
- Model code: C192
- Production: 2023–present
- Model years: 2024–present
- Assembly: Sindelfingen, Germany
- Designer: Slavche Tanevski

Body and chassis
- Body style: 2-door 2+2 liftback/fastback coupé
- Layout: Front-engine, rear-wheel-drive Front-engine, all-wheel-drive (4MATIC+)
- Platform: MSA
- Related: Mercedes-Benz SL (R232)

Powertrain
- Engine: 2.0 L M139 mild hybrid turbo (EQ Boost) I4; 4.0 L M177 twin-turbo V8; 4.0 L M177 twin-turbo PHEV V8 (GT 63 S E Performance)
- Electric motor: 14 hp (10 kW) electrically assisted turbocharger system by Garrett Motion; 150 kW (201 hp) synchronous electric motor (63 S E Performance)
- Transmission: 9-speed Mercedes-AMG Speedshift MCT 9G-Tronic automatic
- Hybrid drivetrain: Mild hybrid (EQ Boost); Plug-in (63 S E Performance)
- Battery: AMG 400-volt high-performance battery, 4.8 kWh

Dimensions
- Wheelbase: 2,700 mm (106.3 in)
- Length: 4,728 mm (186.1 in)
- Width: 1,984 mm (78.1 in)
- Height: 1,354 mm (53.3 in)
- Kerb weight: 1,775–1,970 kg (3,910–4,340 lb)

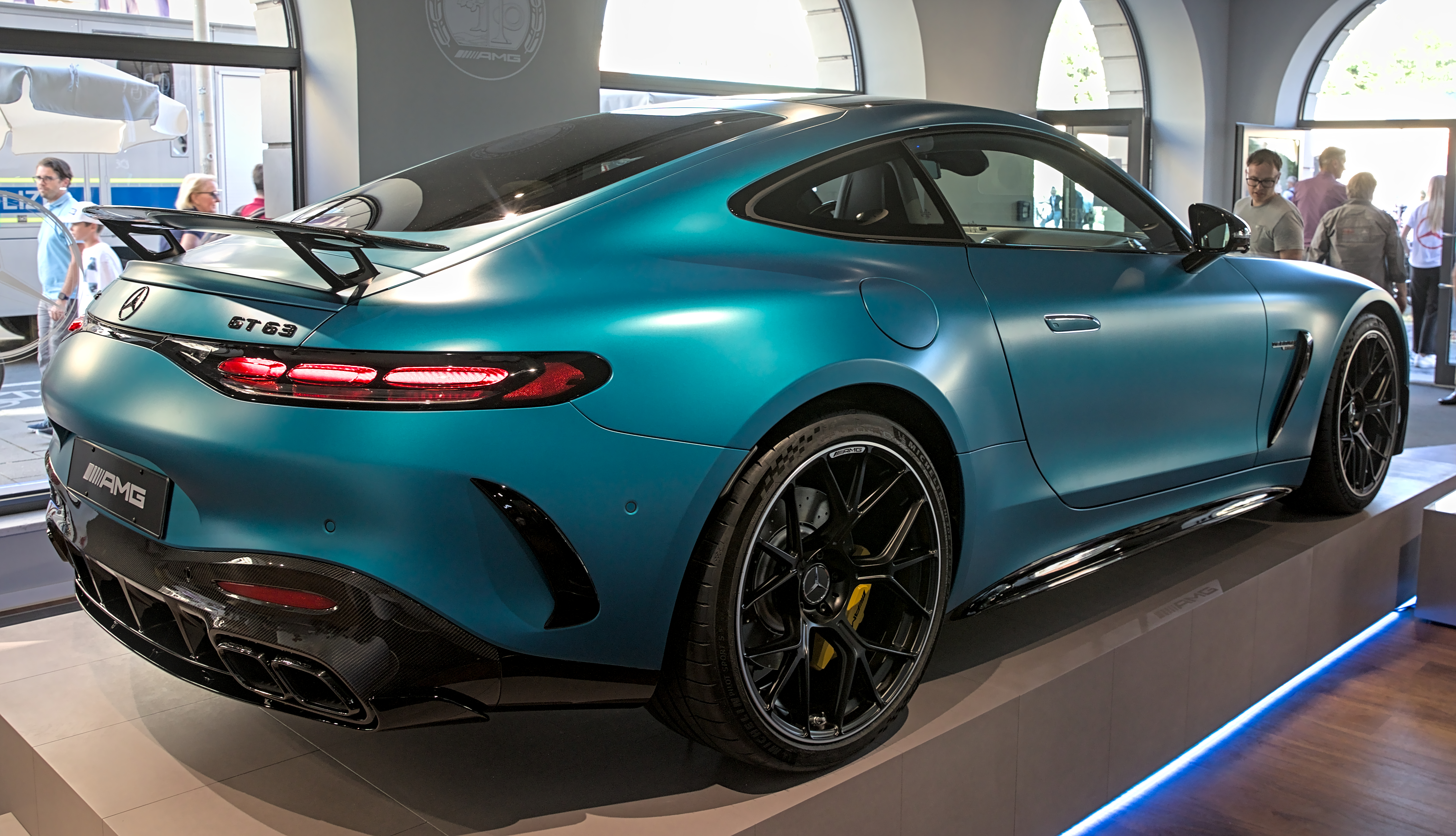
Rear view

The second generation AMG GT was unveiled at the Pebble Beach Concours d'Elegance on 19 August 2023, eleven months after the previous generation was discontinued, and production began the following month. It is offered as a coupe, and uses the same platform as the new SL roadster. It is longer than its predecessor, which allows for a 2+2 cabin setup.

At launch, a 4.0 L V8 engine was offered in two variants, the 469 hp (350 kW) GT 55, and the 577 hp (430 kW) GT 63, both with four-wheel drive. In 2024, two powertrains were added: a plug-in hybrid version of the V8 for the GT 63 S E Performance with four-wheel drive, and a 2.0 L four-cylinder mild hybrid used in the rear-wheel-drive GT 43 and the China-exclusive GT 50. All powertrains are mated to a 9-speed automatic transmission.

=== Variants ===
==== F1 Safety Car ====
The GT 63 Pro is the Formula 1 safety car for the 2026 seasons, making its debut in that role at the 2026 Hungarian Grand Prix, replacing the Black Series.

==== Mercedes-AMG GT 63 Pro (2025) ====
On 22 July 2024, Mercedes-Benz unveiled the GT 63 Pro. Meant to be a more track-focused version of the GT 63, the GT 63 Pro was largely the same, but came with upgrades like additional radiators, standard carbon-ceramic brakes, reduced lift, and more downforce, resulting in faster acceleration and better stability at high speeds. It also had more power compared to the standard GT 63, from 577 hp (430 kW) to 612 hp (450 kW).

==== Mercedes-AMG GT 63 APXGP Edition (2026) ====
On 21 June 2025, Mercedes-Benz unveiled the limited edition GT 63 APXGP Edition based on the APXGP cars from the film F1. It features a satin black paint finish with bold graphics directly from the cars in the movie, gold checkerboard flag pattern on doors, gold wheels and other special touches. Production was expected to limited in 52 units and made available for 2026.

The APXGP Edition was showcased on the Mercedes-Benz USA YouTube channel and driven by Joshua Pearce (Damson Idris).

Baku 2026 F1 Pace cars with Medical cars in background

Type	Model	Engine	Power (at rpm)	Torque (at rpm)	Acceleration 0–100 km/h (0–62 mph)	Top speed	Layout	Cal. years
Petrol mild hybrid	GT 43/GT 50	M139 I4 turbo 1,991 cc (2.0 L)	310 kW (416 hp; 421 PS) at 6750 rpm	500 N⋅m (369 lb⋅ft) at 3250–5000 rpm	4.6 sec	280 km/h (174 mph)	RWD	2024–present
Petrol	GT 55	M177; 3,982 cc (4.0 L) V8	350 kW (469 hp; 476 PS) at 5,500-6,500 rpm	700 N⋅m (516 lb⋅ft) at 2,250-4,500 rpm	3.9 sec	295 km/h (183 mph)	AWD	2023–present
Petrol	GT 63	M177; 3,982 cc (4.0 L) V8	430 kW (577 hp; 585 PS) at 5,500-6,500 rpm	800 N⋅m (590 lb⋅ft) at 2,500-5,000 rpm	3.2 sec	315 km/h (196 mph)	AWD	2023–present
Petrol	GT 63 PRO	M177; 3,982 cc (4.0 L) V8	450 kW (603 hp; 612 PS) at 5,500-6,500 rpm	850 N⋅m (627 lb⋅ft) at 2,500-5,000 rpm	3.2 sec	317 km/h (197 mph)	AWD	2024–present
Petrol PHEV	GT 63 S E Performance	M177; 3,982 cc (4.0 L) V8	600 kW (805 hp; 816 PS) at 5,500-6,500 rpm	1,420 N⋅m (1,047 lb⋅ft) at 2,500-5,000 rpm	2.8 sec	320 km/h (199 mph)	AWD	2024–present
Petrol	GT2	M177; 3,982 cc (4.0 L) V8	520 kW (697 hp; 707 PS)	800 N⋅m (590 lb⋅ft)			RWD	2023–present
Petrol	GT2 Pro	M177; 3,982 cc (4.0 L) V8	551 kW (749 PS; 739 bhp) (551 kW (749 PS; 739 bhp) with Push2Pass)	800 N⋅m (590 lbf⋅ft)			RWD	2023–present
Petrol	GT2 Edition W16	M177; 3,982 cc (4.0 L) V8	520 kW (697 hp; 707 PS) (830 PS (610 kW; 819 hp) with Push2Pass)	800 N⋅m (590 lb⋅ft) (1,000 N⋅m (738 lb⋅ft) with Push2Pass)		Over 320 km/h (199 mph)	RWD	2025

== Motorsport ==
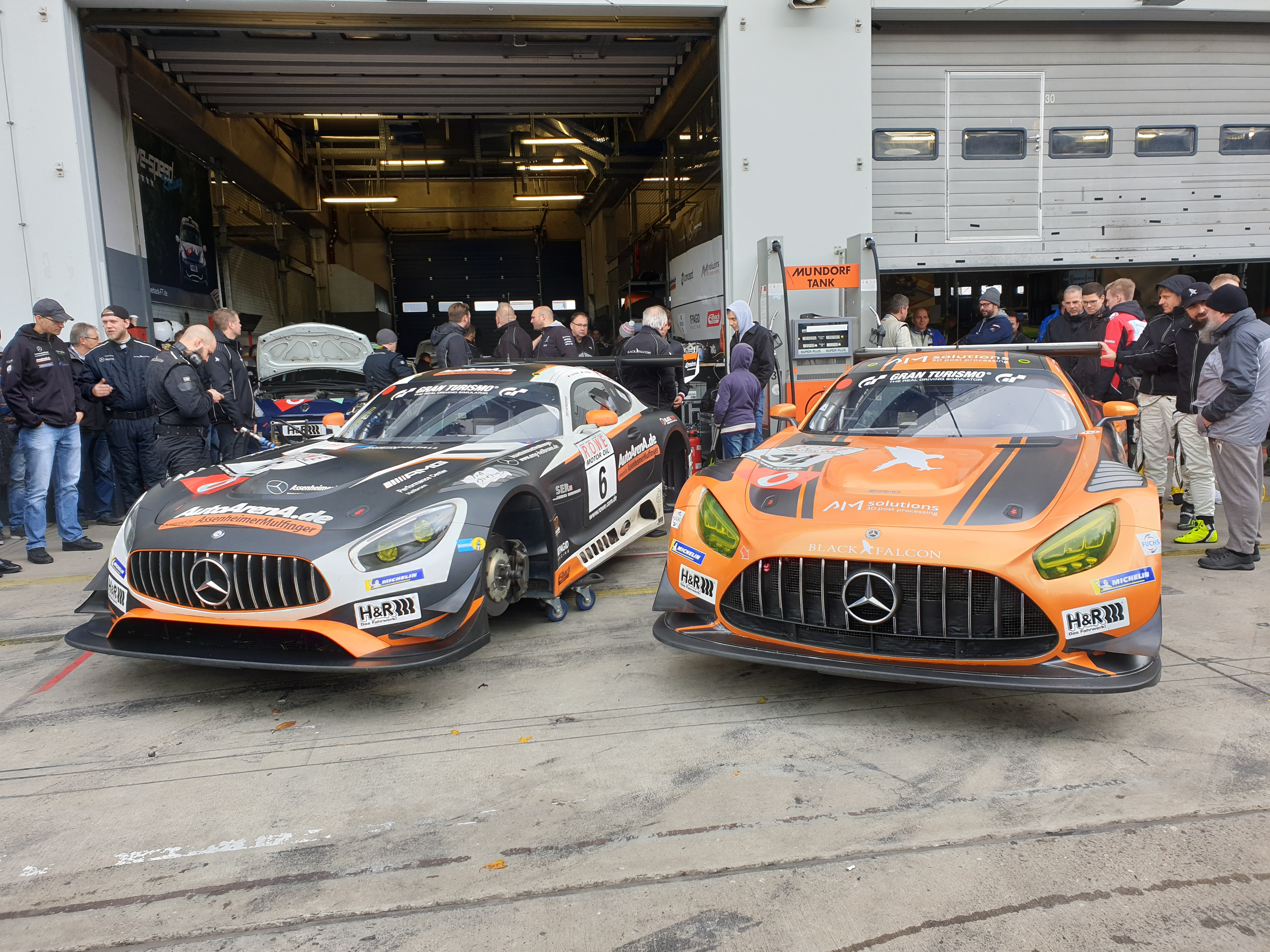
AMG GT3 and AMG GT3 Evo of Black Falcon

=== AMG GT3 (2015–2019) ===
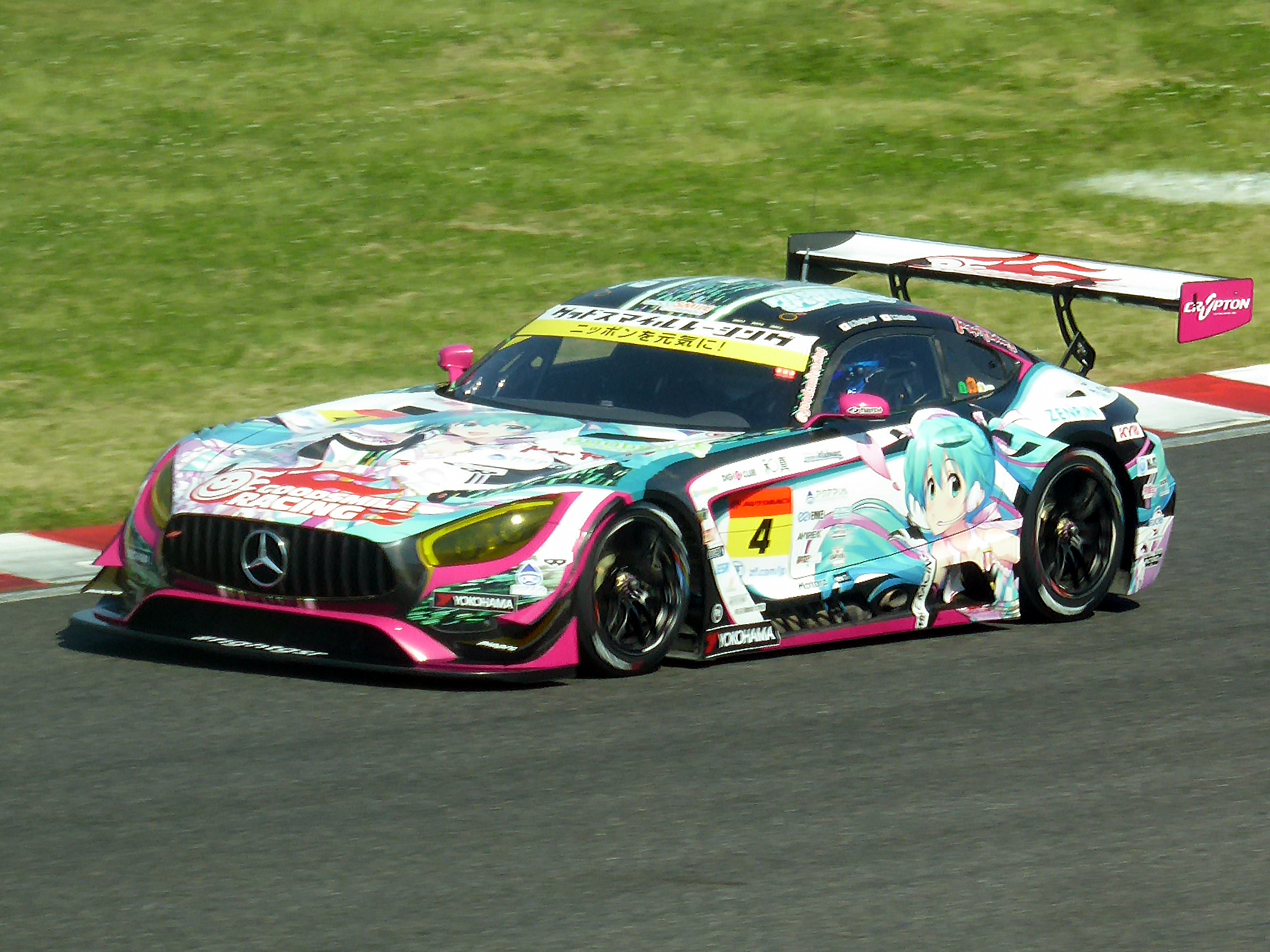
Good Smile Racing's Hatsune Miku-livered AMG GT3 at Suzuka Circuit in 2019

In March 2015, Mercedes-AMG presented the AMG GT3, a race version of the GT, at the Geneva Motor Show, which employs the M159 6,208 cc (378.8 cu in) V8 naturally aspirated engine also used in the SLS AMG GT3. It consists largely of carbon-fiber-reinforced polymer to decrease the vehicle's weight to under 1,300 kg (2,866 lb) to comply with FIA regulations for races. In 2016, AKKA ASP, Black Falcon, HTP Motorsport and Zakspeed competed in the Blancpain Endurance Series. Zakspeed also competed in the ADAC GT Masters. They claimed a 1-2-3-4 and 6 at the 24 Hours Nürburgring.

In the 2016 Super GT GT300 class, the AMG GT3s made their Super GT debut with Good Smile Racing with Team UKYO, the number 11 GAINER team, LEON Racing, and Rn-sports opting to use the AMG GT3s in favor of the SLS AMG GT3s that they used in the previous season. Two Mercedes customer teams, R'Qs Motor Sports and Arnage Racing, opted to continue using the SLS AMG GT3s. Both of them would switch to AMG GT3s during the 2018 season, switching from SLS AMG GT3 and Ferrari 488 GT3 respectively.

New Zealand born driver Craig Baird gave the new AMG GT3 its first race win anywhere when he took out race 1 of round 2 of the 2016 Australian GT Championship at the Melbourne Grand Prix Circuit on 17 March 2016. The round was held as a support race to the 2016 Australian Grand Prix.

Riley Technologies entered two customer AMG GT3s in the 2017 IMSA SportsCar Championship GTD class. One of the teams cars finished 3rd in class and 20th outright at the 2017 24 Hours of Daytona before going on to win the GTD class and finish 16th outright in the 2017 12 Hours of Sebring. As of June 2019, a total of 130 GT3 cars were sold.

=== AMG GT4 (2017–present) ===
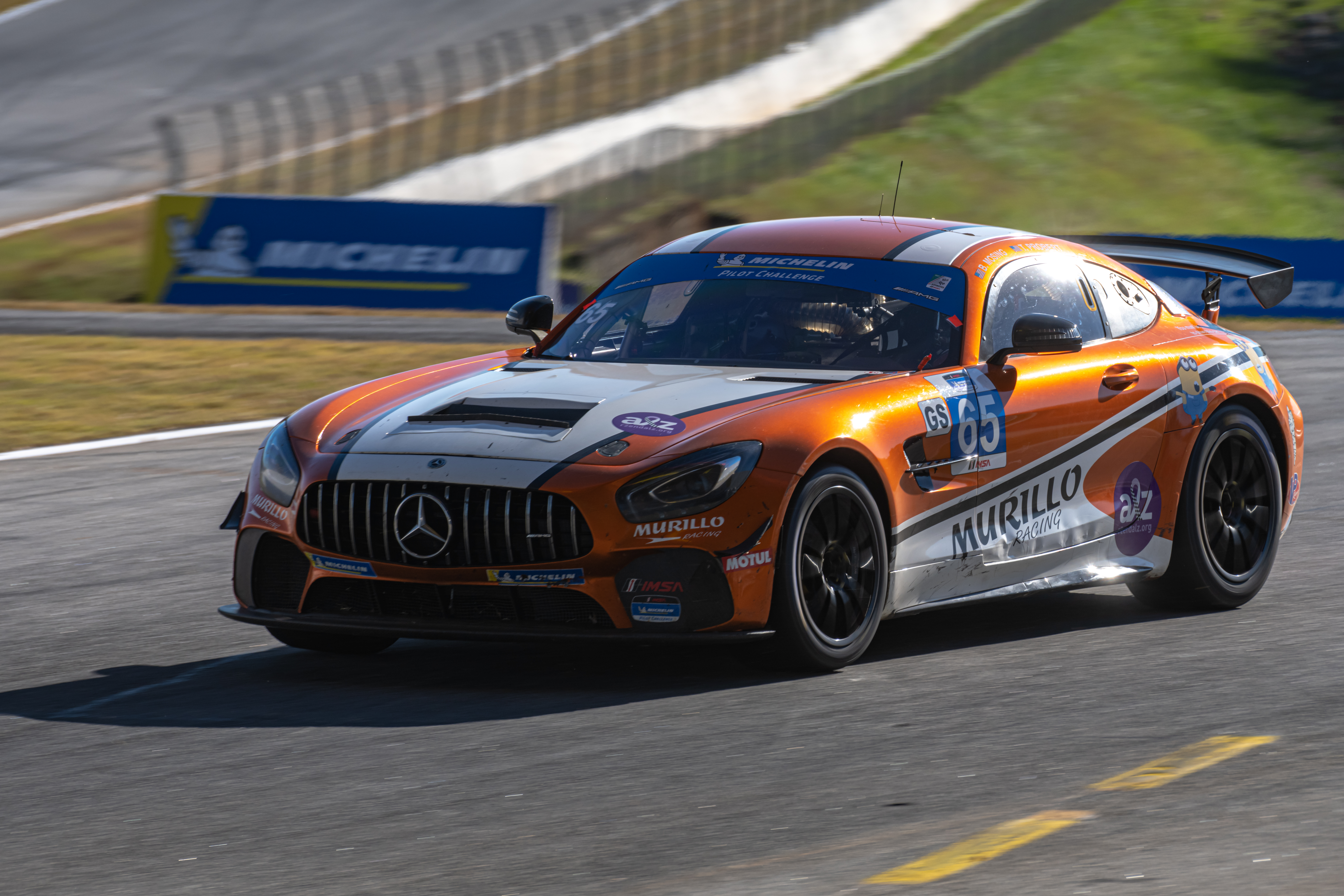
AMG GT4 of Murillo Racing

A GT4 version of the Mercedes-AMG GT was presented at the 2017 24 Hours of Spa. This customer racing car is based on the GT R road version and it made its debut in the ROWE 6 Stunden ADAC Ruhr-Pokal-Rennen race, the fifth round of the 2017 VLN season. The car received significant upgrades for the 2022 season.

=== AMG GT3 Evo (2020–2029) ===
The AMG GT3 Evo of Iron Lynx at the 2025 24 Hours of Le Mans

An updated version of the GT3 was introduced at the 24 Hours of Nürburgring in June 2019 for the 2020 season of the FIA GT3 category. New technologies include an automatic data logger and analysis system, a function to automatically start the engine when the car is lowered from its in-built air jacks along with new brake and traction control systems. The design was also updated in line with the design of the new design update of the AMG GT road car with the changes being the new headlamps and the grille with the latter providing better protection for the radiator. The front splitter and rear wing were tweaked in order for faster adjustments. The car uses the same 6.2-litre V8 engine as the previous model rather than the 4.0-litre V8 engine of the road car, its engineers stating the user friendliness and reliability of the engine as the main factor of its retention.

The car's eligibility for the FIA World Endurance Championship's LM GT3 class starting from 2025 marked the marque's return to the 24 Hours of Le Mans since 1999, after the Mercedes-Benz CLR backflip incidents.

=== AMG GT2 (2023–present) ===
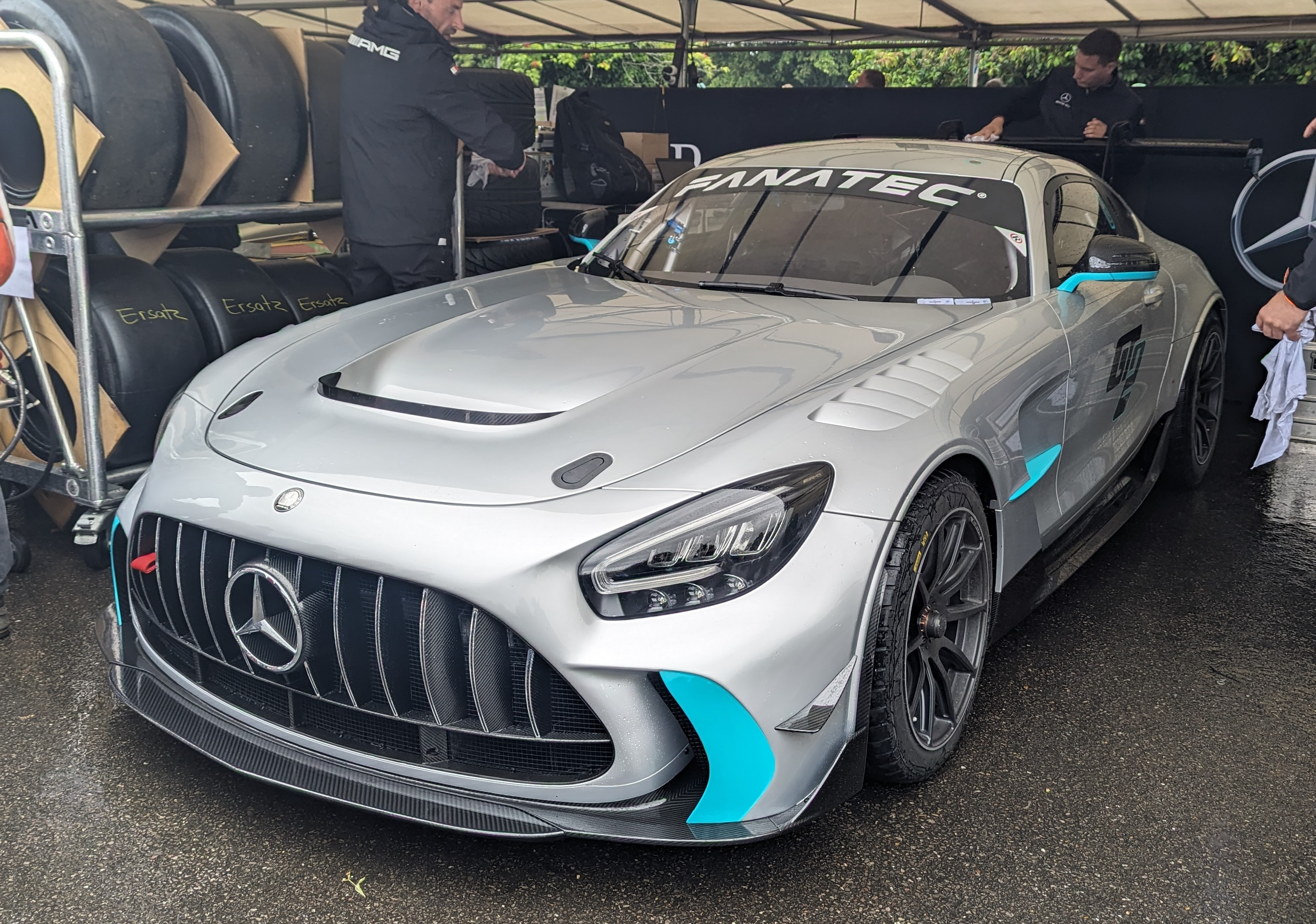
AMG GT2

The Mercedes-AMG GT2 was unveiled in December 2022, created for participation in the SRO GT2 category. The car features a 520 kW (697 hp; 707 PS) 4.0-liter biturbo V8 AMG engine, making it the most powerful customer Mercedes car yet. The car made its racing debut during the first round of the 2023 GT2 European Series at Monza, and won its first race during the second round at the Red Bull Ring.

=== AMG GT2 Pro (2023–present) ===
AMG GT2 Pro

The Mercedes-AMG GT2 Pro is a non-homologated track day version of the Mercedes-AMG GT2. The engine has been upgraded, with a base output of 551 kW (749 PS; 739 bhp), which can be temporarily raised to (551 kW (749 PS; 739 bhp) with the Push2Pass function activated. It also features redesigned rear wing end plates, four-way adjustable dampers (up from three-way on the GT2), revised aerodynamics, upgraded engine and brake cooling, a revised interior, and a new wheel design and paint finish.

=== AMG GT2 Edition W16 (2025) ===
In September, 2025, Mercedes-AMG unveiled the GT2 Edition W16, inspired by their Formula One team's W16 racecar. It was developed for track-day use, without racing homologation rules in mind, and is limited to 30 units. The engine has been upgraded with new turbochargers and a revised ECU, increasing the base output to 730 PS (537 kW; 720 bhp), with up to 830 PS (610 kW; 819 hp) and 1,000 N⋅m (738 lb⋅ft) temporarily available when the Push2Pass function is activated. The total weight is quoted at 1,430 kg (3,153 lb). It also features improved aerodynamics over the GT2, including a larger front diffuser, lower drag side mirrors, a carbon lip spoiler, active louvers above the front wheels, and a drag reduction system.

=== AMG GT3 (2027–present) ===
In January 2025, Mercedes-AMG confirmed that it was starting development of a second-generation AMG GT3 stating that they planned to start track testing the car later that year. They also stated that they expected it to make its customer debut in 2027.

On 23 March 2026, Mercedes revealed the new AMG GT3 in concept form alongside a new Black Series, claiming that these would be released as distinct models from the existing second-generation car. The race car will be the first Mercedes developed by Affalterbach Racing GmbH, a new, wholly-owned subsidiary of Mercedes-AMG, while the road car will homologate the racing variant.

== Production and sales ==
Calendar year	Production	US sales	Notes
2015	~8100	1,277	GT, GT S
2016	~4800	1,227	GT, GT S
2017	~6400	1,608	GT & Roadster, GT S, GT C Edition 50 & Roadster, GT R
2018	~5500	1,525	GT, GT S, GT C, GT R
2019	~4700		GT, GT S, GT C, GT R & Roadster, GT R Pro
2020	~1800		GT, GT C, GT R & Roadster, GT Black Series
2021	~2100		GT Black Series, GT C & Roadster, GT & Night Edition

Official US Sales figures for 2019, 2020 and 2021 also include the X290 GT 4-door coupe.
