= Amedeo Felisa =

Italian businessman

Amedeo Felisa (born 1946) is an Italian businessman and automotive industry executive. He was chief executive (CEO) of Aston Martin from May 2022 to September 2024 and CEO of Ferrari from 2008 to 2016.

Felisa was born in Milan in 1946. He earned a degree in mechanical engineering from the Polytechnic University of Milan.

Felisa was CEO of Ferrari from 2008 to 2016 when it was a Fiat subsidiary.

In May 2022, Aston Martin announced that Tobias Moers was stepping down as CEO with immediate effect, and that Felisa would succeed him.
