= Tobias Moers =

German businessman and CEO of Aston Martin

- Born: Tobias Karl Moers; May 1966 (age 60); Freiburg, Germany
- Education: University of Applied Sciences Offenburg
- Occupation: Business executive
- Children: 2

Tobias Karl Moers (born May 1966) is a German business executive, who was the chief executive (CEO) of Aston Martin from August 2020 to May 2022.

== Early years and education ==
Moers was born in May 1966 in Freiburg. He studied mechanical engineering at the University of Applied Sciences Offenburg (Dipl.-Wirtschaftsingenieur FH).

== Career ==
After graduating from university, Moers began his career working on the development of the Hotzenblitz, an early German electric vehicle, eventually leading the team responsible for bringing the prototype into production.

Moers worked for Daimler AG for 26 years, rising to chairman of the management board and chief executive officer of Mercedes-AMG GmbH in October 2013.

In August 2020, Moers joined Aston Martin Lagonda as CEO. As CEO, Moers oversaw the company's transition toward electrification, negotiating a technology partnership with Mercedes-Benz that increased the company's stake in Aston Martin.

In May 2022, it was announced that Moers was stepping down as CEO with immediate effect, remaining as a consultant until end July, and that Amedeo Felisa would succeed him.

In September 2022, it was announced that Moers had been appointed co-CEO of the Swiss electric car manufacturer Piëch Automotive together with former Lamborghini brand director Manfred Fitzgerald.

== Personal life ==
Moers has two children.
