= Audi S and RS models =

Audi S, Audi RS
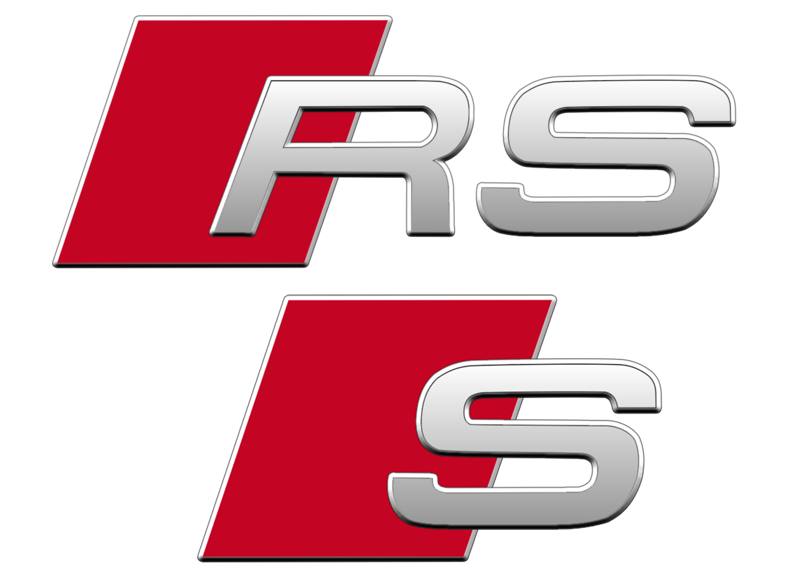

Overview
- Manufacturer: Audi AG
- Production: 1983–present
- Assembly: Audi Sport GmbH; Neckarsulm, Germany

Body and chassis
- Class: C (S3, RS3), D (S5), E (S6, S6 e-tron, RS6, S7, RS 7, S e-tron GT, RS e-tron GT), and F (S8)
- Layout: 4WD (quattro)
- Related: Audi R8

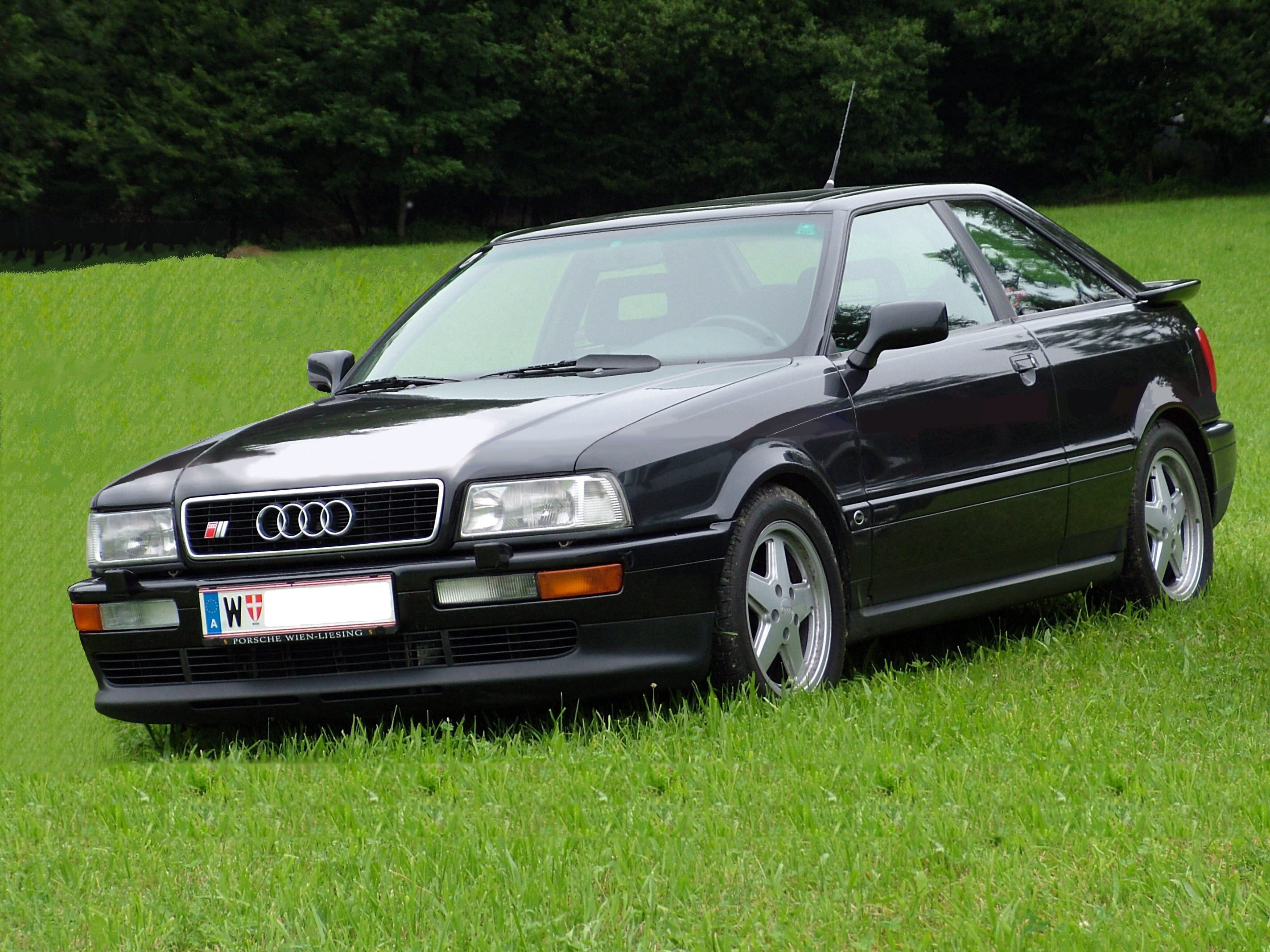
Audi S2, the original Audi "S" car, produced from 1990 to 1994

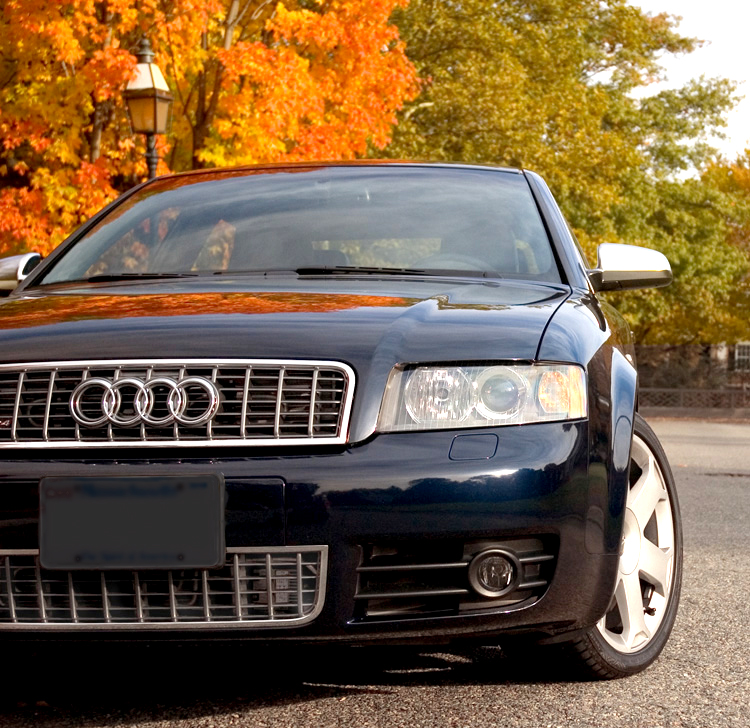
Detail of the "S" vertical emphasis lines on the front grill of a B6 S4

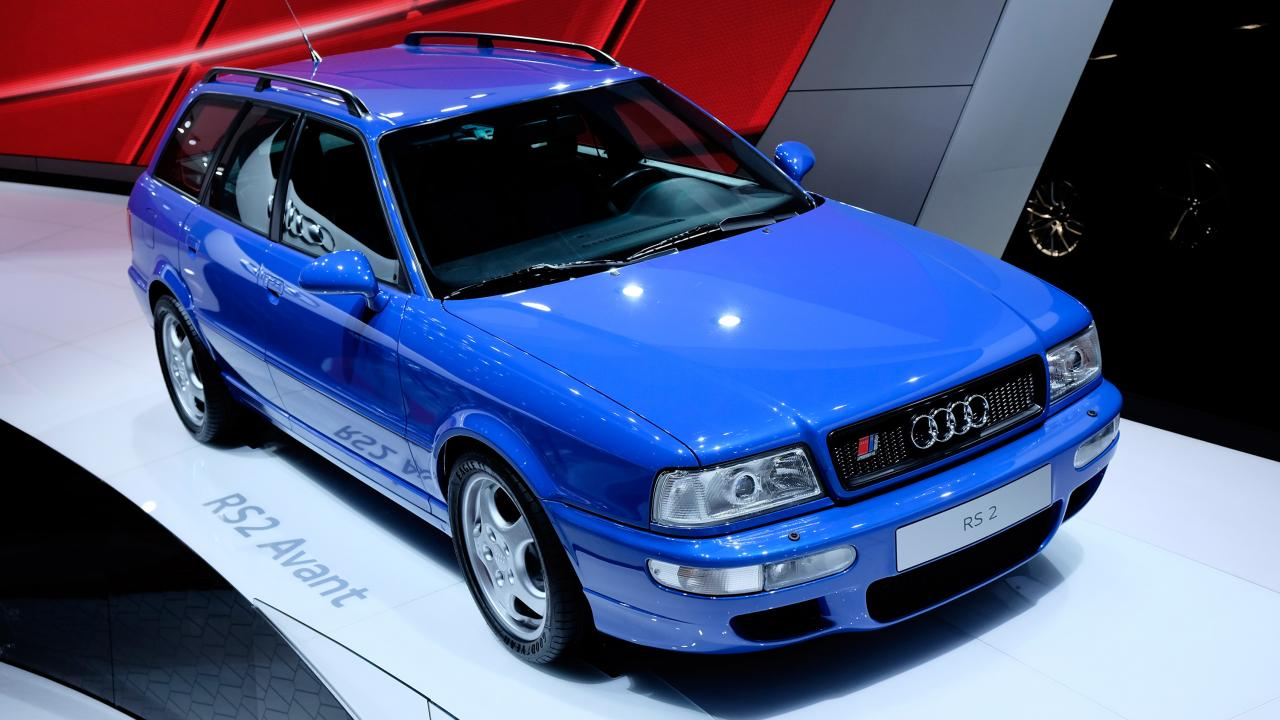
Audi RS2, the original Audi "RS" car, a joint venture between Audi and Porsche from 1994 to 1995.

Audi S and RS models are a range of high performance versions of certain car models of the German automotive company Audi AG. These cars primarily focus on enhanced "sport" performance. Production of Audi "S" cars began in 1990 with the S2 Coupé, whilst the first "RS" car appeared four years later with the Audi RS 2 Avant.

Today's S and RS models are based on the A/e-tron GT/Q models with the same number (e.g. S4/RS 4 is based on the A4 or the RS Q3 based on the Q3), but the "Ur-S4" from 1991 to 1994 was based on the Audi 100/200 later named A6 and the first S2/RS2 generation from 1990 to 1995 was based on the Audi 80/90 platform later replaced by the A4.

== History ==
The history of road versions of Audi racing cars begins in the 1980s, from models Audi Quattro and Audi Sport Quattro made by concern Audi AG in the city of Ingolstadt. In 1983, the company Quattro GmbH was founded (since November 2016, "Audi Sport GmbH") in the city of Neckarsulm responsible for the development of sports models of cars of Audi brand. In 1990, appeared based on the model Audi 80 sports model S2 as a receiver Audi Quattro but already under the designation of the series "S" in the name and having a capacity of 220 hp. And in 1994 there was even more powerful model Audi RS2 Avant based on Audi 80 model of joint development of Audi and Porsche having 315 hp. The model was equipped with components from Porsche. As in 1973, Audi, together with Porsche, also developed a prototype based on the Audi 100 Coupé S, produced in 1968, which has 112 hp. the "Grand tourer" class. which received the name 100 Coupé S V3 and was equipped with a V8 engine with a power of 350 hp.

Since 1994, the development of the Audi S and RS sports series was started directly from the Quattro.

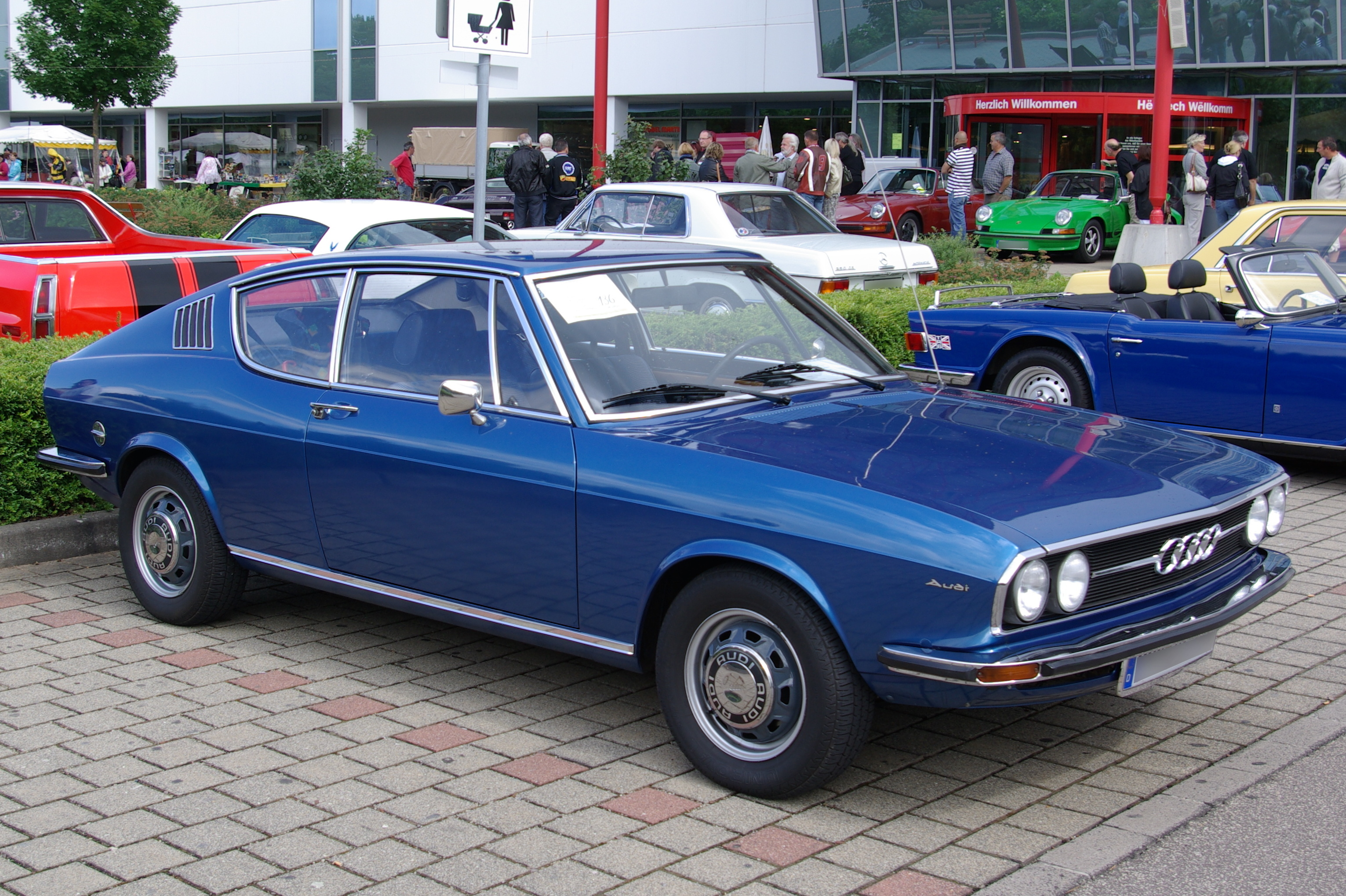
1969 Audi 100 Coupé S

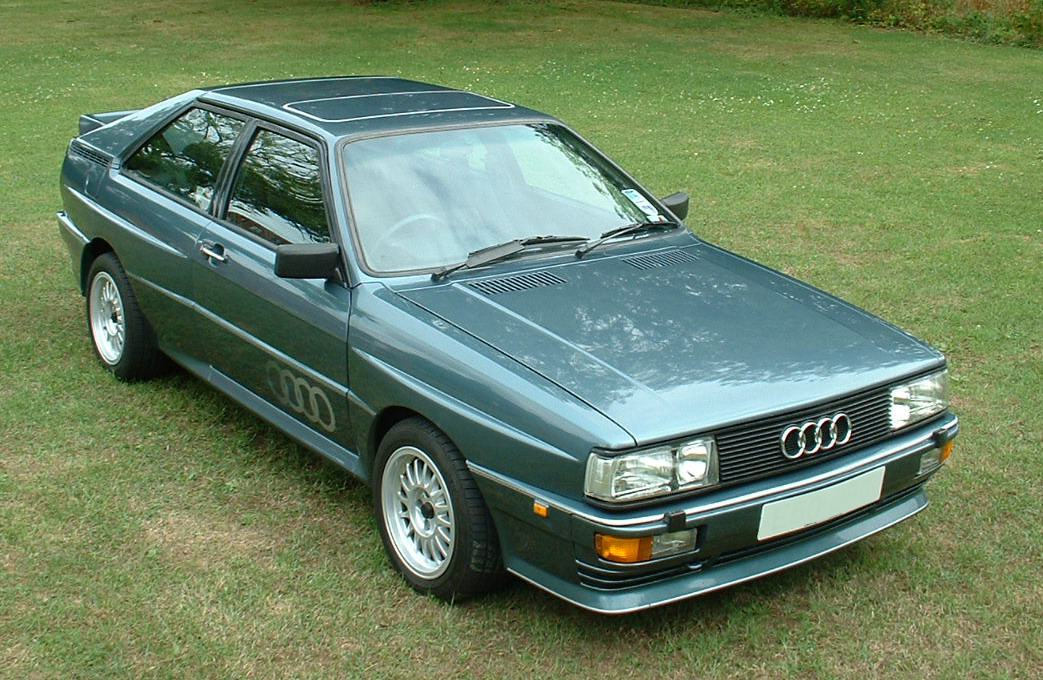
1980 Audi Quattro

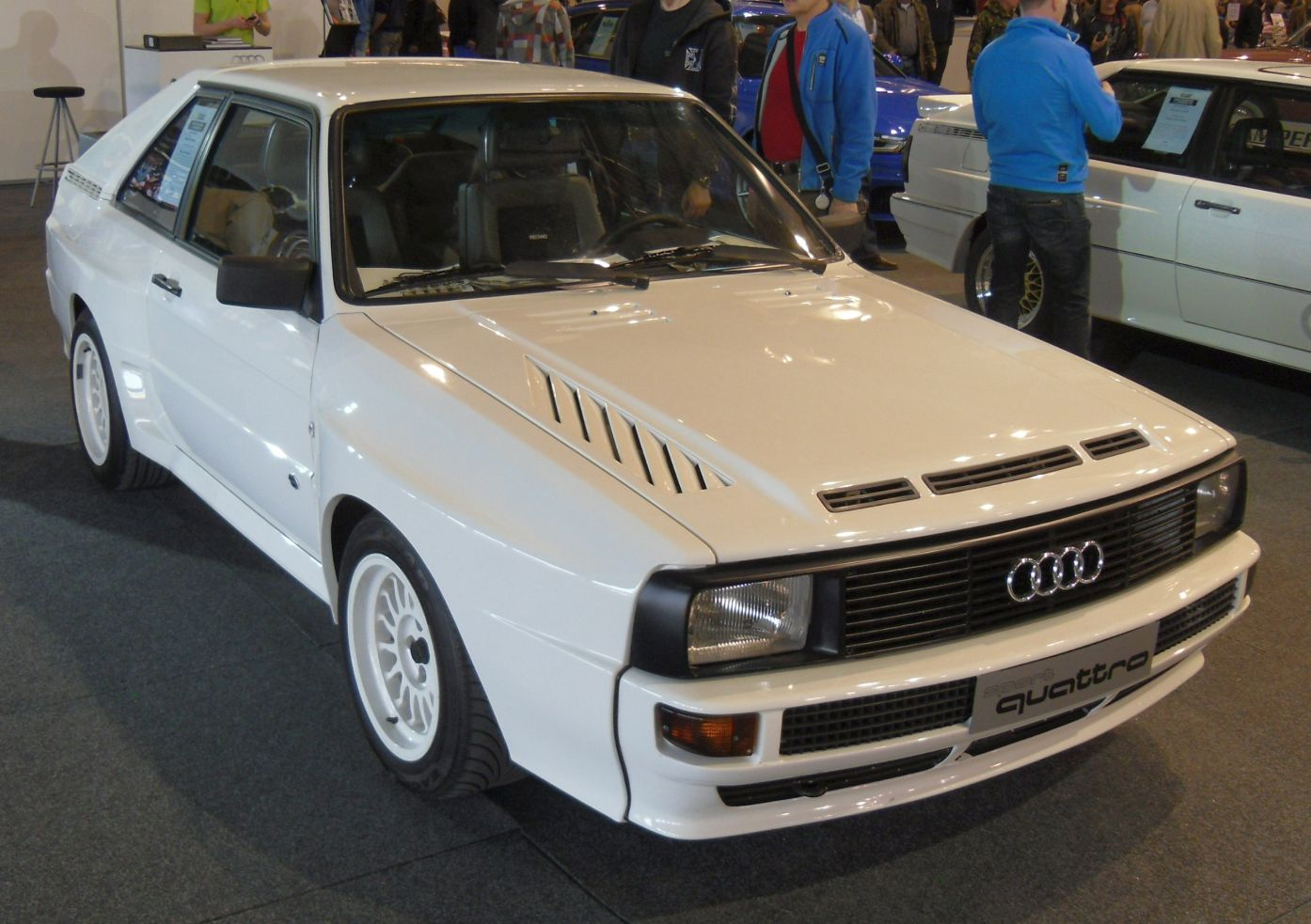
1984 Audi Sport Quattro

== S models ==
Numerous "S" models, from most of Audi's mainstream model ranges have been produced over the years. These cars are recognisable by their "S" badges, and unique emphasis lines on their front grilles and on the back side, instead of the letter "A" in the designation of numbers and also in use in the notation "S3", and "SQ5".

All Audi "S" models are equipped with Audi's 'trademark' quattro four-wheel drive system as standard. Unique internal combustion engines, along with larger, more powerful brakes, stiffer suspension systems, additional exterior body styling, and carbon fibre interior trims set them apart from their related "siblings" of their respective model range.

In the past, some Audi S models competed directly with BMW M and Mercedes-AMG models, especially if Audi RS models are not offered, such as the B6 Audi S4 4.2 FSI versus the BMW M3 and Mercedes-Benz C32 AMG. Since 2010 however, Audi S models have been positioned more as optional engine trims. For instance the base Audi A4 (B8) engine is the 2.0 TFSI turbo four-cylinder, and with the discontinuation of the 3.2 FSI V6, that makes the Audi S4's 3.0 TFSI V6 the performance option (the B8 Audi S4 3.0 TFSI positioned closer to the E90 BMW 335i than the BMW M3). The Audi A6 (C7) no longer has a V8 engine upgrade in the non "S" range, with the discontinuation of the C6 Audi A6 4.2 FSI that was offered from 2004 – 2011, one must go to the C7 Audi S6 4.0 TFSI.

Audi 'S' models should not be confused with Audi 'A' and 'Q' series models equipped with an "S line" package, which features sport tuned suspension and cosmetic upgrades such as leather trim, S-line badging, and sports steering wheel, but are not equipped with a higher-performance engine.

== RS models ==
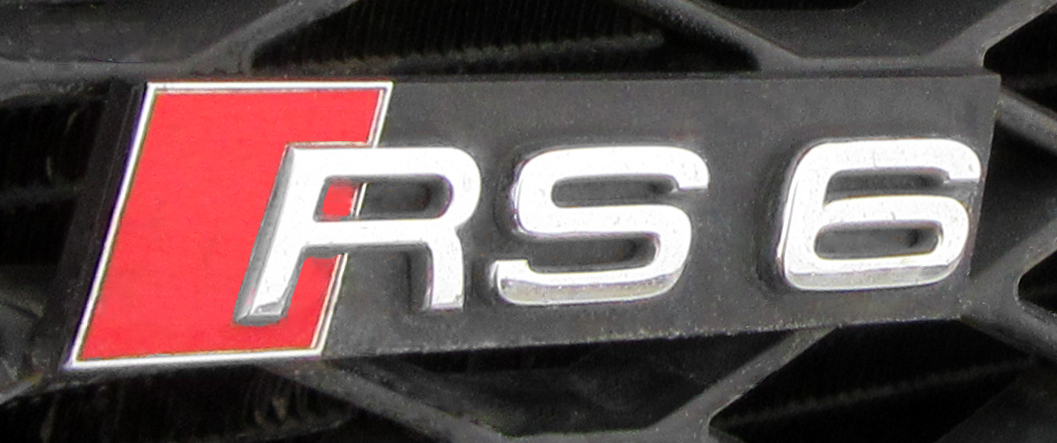
Audi RS6 model emblem

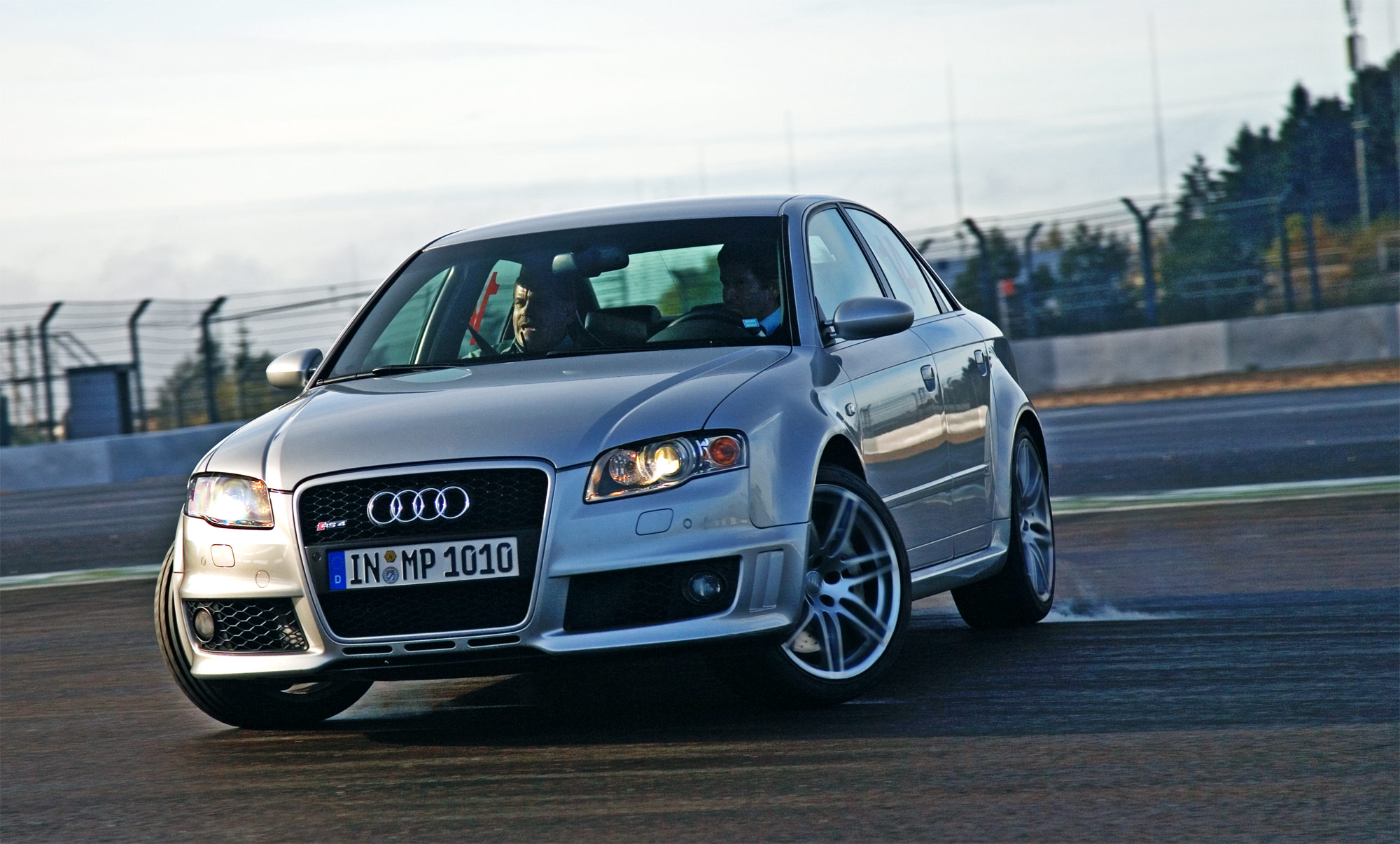
Audi RS 4 Sedan quattro (B7)

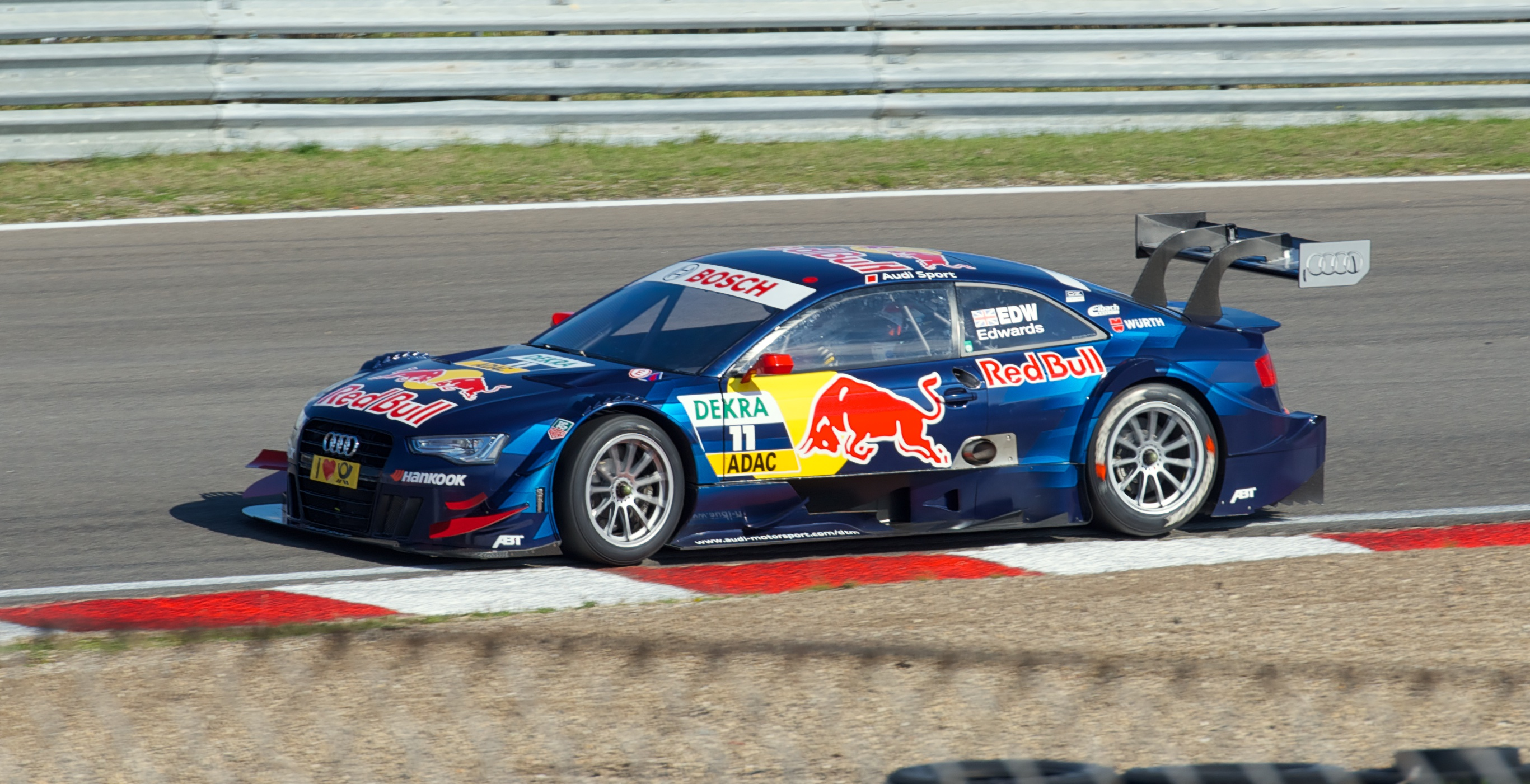
Audi RS5 DTM ABT Sportsline

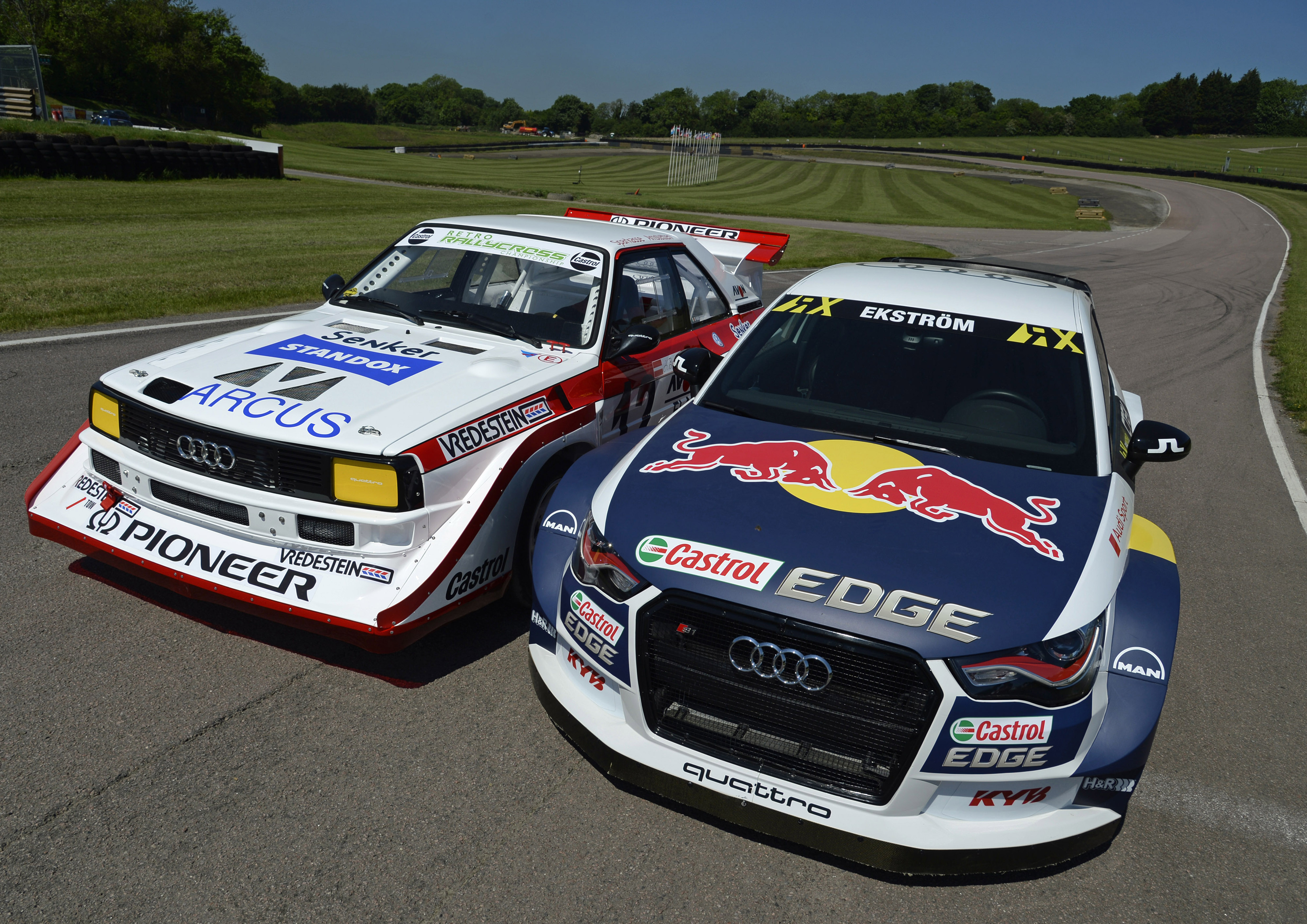
Racecars Audi Sport Quattro S1 and Audi S1 EKS RX

Audi Sport GmbH (formerly quattro GmbH), AUDI AGs high performance private subsidiary, creates even higher performance versions, known by their "RS" badging. The "RS" initials are taken from the German: RennSport — literally translated as "racing sport". The characteristics and cost of these cars are equated to cars belonging to the supercar class.

RS is Audi's highest performance 'top-tier' trim level, positioned distinctly above the "S" ("Sport") specification level of Audi's regular model range. All "RS" cars pioneer some of Audi's latest and most advanced technology and engineering prowess, therefore, "RS" cars are considered by some as "halo vehicles". Audi RS cars are some of the most powerful vehicles ever offered by Audi as well as R8. Audi RS 6 (5.0 TFSI quattro), for instance, is more powerful than the physically larger Audi S8 (5.2 FSI quattro). However, the 2012 — 2015 Audi S8 shares the same engine as the 2013 — 2018 Audi RS 6 and Audi RS 7, albeit in a lower state of tune, while for the 2016 — 2017 model years, the facelifted Audi S8 plus is considered 'an "RS" in anything but name as it features an uprated engine with the same output as the smaller RS 6 and RS 7. The 2016-17 S8 Plus was built by Quattro GmbH and has a VIN that starts with WUA to identify it, compared to previous versions of the S8 which were built by Audi on the regular assembly line alongside other A8 variants.

Available for limited time and only in select markets, on a restricted model range, these "RS" (and "S" models) models are wholly designed, developed and produced in-house by Audi AG's high performance private subsidiary company, Audi Sport GmbH, at its Neckarsulm factory.

Unlike Audi "S" models whose interiors are well-furnished in order to retain the feel of sport luxury, the interior of Audi "RS" models are often spartan by comparison as the emphasis is more on track performance than luxury. The 2008 Audi RS 4 sold in Europe had lightweight racing-style front seats and roll-up windows for the rear doors, although its counterpart sold in the United States has luxurious power-adjustable front seats and power windows for all doors 2008 BMW M3 vs. 2007 Audi RS 4, 2008 M-B C63 AMG.

Audi "RS" models are considered direct competitors to similar sized hardcore sport models from BMW M and Mercedes-AMG, whereas the Audi "S" models have been positioned more as engine upgrade trims. Taking the 2012 model year for example, the Audi RS 5 competes directly with the BMW M3, M4 whereas the Audi S5 competes with the BMW 335i, while the Audi RS 6 competes with the BMW M5 and the Audi S6 competes with the BMW 550i. However the Audi RS 6 (C6) was never exported to the United States due to emissions regulations, leaving the Audi S6 (C6) as the top performing trim to compete against the BMW M5 (E60) in that market 2013 Audi S7.

There used to be only one RS model in production at a time, but recently Audi has revised its policies and decided to make more than one RS model at a time, claiming that "customers want them, then why not give it to them".

Сomparison A / S / RS series Audi by example 6—line of models
Model name	Engine type	Engine displacement	Power	Acceleration 0–62 mph (0–100 km/h)	Top speed	Image
A6	I4 — V6	2.0 — 3.0 L.	163 — 340 PS	9.3 — 5.1 sec.	145–155 mph (233–249 km/h)	
S6	V8	4.0 L.	450 PS	4.4 sec.	155 mph (249 km/h)	
RS 6	V8	4.0 L.	600 PS	3.6 sec.	190 mph (306 km/h)	

== Model range ==
The following Audi "S" and "RS" high performance models are being, or have been produced, or are speculated to be in future production:

=== Current models ===
(In model range order)

Audi model name	VW Group platform	Typ code	engine type	max.motive power	acceleration 0-62 mph (0-100 km/h)	top speed	car body style(s)	weight	production year	image
Audi RS 5	PPC		2,894 cc V6 TFSI PHEV	470 kW (639 PS; 630 bhp)	3.6 sec.	177 mph (285 km/h)	5 dr, 5 seat Saloon (sedan) 5 dr, 5 seat mid-size Avant (estate/wagon)	2,355 kg (5,192 lb) 2,370 kg (5,225 lb)	2026	
Audi SQ5&SQ5 Sportback	PPC		2,995 cc V6 TFSI	270 kW (367 PS; 362 bhp)	4.5 sec.	155 mph (249 km/h)	5 dr, 5 seat Crossover	2,115 kg (4,663 lb)	2024	
Audi S6 e-tron	PPE		Electric	405 kW (551 PS; 543 bhp)	3.9 sec.	149 mph (240 km/h)	5 dr, 5 seat Saloon (sedan) 5 dr, 5 seat mid-size Avant (estate/wagon)	2,400 kg (5,291 lb)	2024	
Audi S5	PPC		2,995 cc V6 TFSI	270 kW (367 PS; 362 bhp)	4.5 sec.	155 mph (249 km/h)	5 dr, 5 seat Saloon (sedan) 5 dr, 5 seat mid-size Avant (estate/wagon)	2,025 kg (4,464 lb) 2,040 kg (4,497 lb)	2024	
Audi S e-tron GT	J1	n/a	Electric	500 kW (680 PS; 671 bhp)	3.6-3.4 sec.	152 mph (245 km/h)	4 dr, 5 seat Saloon (sedan)	2,385 kg (5,258 lb)	2024	
Audi SQ6 e-tron & SQ6 e-tron Sportback	PPE		Electric	380 kW (517 PS; 510 bhp)	4.3 sec.	143 mph (230 km/h)	5 dr, 5 seat Crossover	2,350 kg (5,181 lb)	2023	
Audi RS e-tron GT	J1	n/a	Electric	630 kW (857 PS; 845 bhp)-680 kW (925 PS; 912 bhp)	3.1-2.5 sec.	155 mph (249 km/h)	4 dr, 5 seat Saloon (sedan)	2,395 kg (5,280 lb)	2021	
Audi RS Q8	MLB	n/a	3,993 cc V8 TFSI	441 kW (600 PS; 591 bhp)	3.8 sec.	190 mph (306 km/h)	5 dr, 5 seat Crossover	2,390 kg (5,269 lb)	2020	
Audi SQ8	MLB		3,956 cc V8 TDI	320 kW (435 PS; 429 bhp)	4.3 sec.	155 mph (249 km/h)	5 dr, 5 seat Crossover	2,440 kg (5,379 lb)	2019	
Audi S3	MQB	8Y	1,984 cc I4 TFSI	221 kW (300 PS; 296 bhp)	4.8 sec.	155 mph (249 km/h)	5 dr, 5 seat Sportback (hatchback) 4 dr, 5 seat Saloon (sedan)	1,500 kg (3,307 lb) 1,505 kg (3,318 lb)	2019	
Audi RS 3 Sportback & Sedan	MQB	8Y	2,480 cc I5 20v TFSI	294 kW (400 PS; 394 bhp)	3.8 sec.	155 mph (249 km/h)	5 dr, 5 seat Sportback (hatchback) 4 dr, 5 seat Saloon (sedan)	1,570 kg (3,461 lb) 1,575 kg (3,472 lb)	2019	
Audi SQ7	MLB	4M	3,956 cc V8 TDI	320 kW (435 PS; 429 bhp)	4.8 sec.	155 mph (249 km/h)	4 dr, 5 seat Crossover	2,395 kg (5,280 lb)	2019	

=== Former models ===
(In chronological order of production end — oldest first)

Audi model name	VW Group platform	Typ code	engine type	max. motive power	acceleration 0-62 mph (0-100 km/h)	top speed	car body style(s)	weight	production year(s)	image
Audi S2	B3, B4	8B, 8C	2,226 сс I5 20vT	162–169 kW (220–230 PS; 217–227 bhp)	6.1 — 5.8 sec.	150–153 mph (241–246 km/h)	2 dr, 5 seat Coupé 5 dr, 5 seat Avant (estate/wagon) 4 dr, 5 seat Saloon (sedan)	1,525 kg (3,362 lb)	1990–1995	
Audi 100 S4 ("Ur-S4")	C4	4A	2,226 сс I5 20vT	169 kW (230 PS; 227 bhp)	6.8 sec.	152 mph (245 km/h)	4 dr, 5 seat Saloon (sedan)	1,610–1,730 kg (3,549–3,814 lb)	1991–1994	
Audi RS 2	B4	8C	2,226 сс I5 20vT	232 kW (315 PS; 311 bhp)	4.8 sec.	163 mph (262 km/h)	5 dr, 5 seat Avant (estate/wagon)	1,595 kg (3,516 lb)	1994–1995	
Audi S6 ("Ur-S6")	C4	4A	2,226 сс I5 20vT; 4.2 V8	169 kW (230 PS; 227 bhp) 213 kW (290 PS; 286 bhp)	6.9 — 5.9 sec.	150–155 mph (241–249 km/h)	4 dr, 5 seat Saloon (sedan) 5 dr, 5 seat Avant (estate/wagon)	1,730–1,780 kg (3,814–3,924 lb)	1995–1997	
Audi S6 plus	C4	4A	4,172 сс V8	240 kW (326 PS; 322 bhp)	5.6 sec. (sedan) 5.7 sec. (avant)	155 mph (249 km/h)	4 dr, 5 seat Saloon (sedan) 5 dr, 5 seat Avant (estate/wagon)	1,730–1,780 kg (3,814–3,924 lb)	1996–1997	
Audi RS 4 Avant	B5 (PL45)	8D	2,671 сс V6 T	280 kW (381 PS; 375 bhp)	4.9 sec.	155 mph (249 km/h)	5 dr, 5 seat Avant (estate/wagon)	1,620 kg (3,571 lb)	2000–2001	
Audi S8	D2 (PL62)	4D	4,172 сс V8	250–265 kW (340–360 PS; 335–355 bhp)	6.8 — 5.5 sec. (1996) 6.6 — 5.4 sec. (1999)	155 mph (249 km/h)	4 dr, 5 seat Saloon (sedan)	1,730–1,845 kg (3,814–4,068 lb)	1996–2002	
Audi S4	B5 (PL45)	8D	2,671 сс V6 T	195 kW (265 PS; 261 bhp)	5.8 — 5.6 sec.	155 mph (249 km/h)	4 dr, 5 seat (saloon) 5 dr, 5 seat Avant (estate/wagon)	1,535–1,680 kg (3,384–3,704 lb)	1997–2002	
Audi S6	C5	4B	4,172 сс V8	250 kW (340 PS; 335 bhp)	6.7 — 5.7 sec. (sedan) 6.8 — 5.8 sec. (Avant)	155 mph (249 km/h)	4 dr, 5 seat Saloon (sedan) 5 dr, 5 seat Avant (estate/wagon)	1,815–1,825 kg (4,001–4,023 lb)	1999–2002	
Audi S3	A4 (PQ34)	8L	1781 сс I4 20vT	154–165 kW (209–224 PS; 207–221 bhp)	6.9 sec. (1999) 6.6 sec. (2001)	148 mph (238 km/h) (1999) 151 mph (243 km/h) (2001)	3 dr, 5 seat Hatchback	1,375–1,420 kg (3,031–3,131 lb)	1999–2003	
Audi RS 6	C5	4B	4,172 сс V8 40vT	331 kW (450 PS; 444 bhp)	4.9 sec.	155 mph (249 km/h)	4 dr, 5 seat Saloon (sedan) 5 dr, 5 seat Avant (estate/wagon)	1,840–1,865 kg (4,057–4,112 lb)	2002–2004	
Audi RS 6 plus	C5	4B	4,172 сс V8 40vT	353 kW (480 PS; 473 bhp)	4.4 sec.	174 mph (280 km/h)	5 dr, 5 seat Avant (estate/wagon)	1,880 kg (4,145 lb)	2004	
Audi S4	B6 (PL46)	8E	4,163 сс V8 40vT	253 kW (344 PS; 339 bhp)	5.8 — 5.6 sec. (sedan) 5.9 — 5.8 sec. (Avant) 6.2 — 5.9 sec. (Cabrio)	155 mph (249 km/h)	4 dr, 5 seat Saloon (sedan) 5 dr, 5 seat Avant (estate/wagon) 2 dr, 4 seat Cabriolet (convertible)	1,660 kg 1,720 kg 1,855 kg	2003–2005	
Audi RS 4	B7 (PL47)	8E	4,163 cc V8 FSI	309 kW (420 PS; 414 bhp)	4.8 sec. (sedan) 4.9 sec. (avant) 4.9 sec. (cabrio.)	155 mph (250 km/h)	4 dr, 5 seat Saloon (sedan) 5 dr, 5 seat Avant (estate/wagon) 2 dr, 4 seat Cabriolet (convertible)	1,650 - 1,680 kg 1,710 kg 1,845 kg	2006–2008 (saloon) 2006–2007 (Avant) 2007–2008 (Cabrio.)	
Audi S4	B7 (PL47)	8E	4,163 cc V8 40v	253 kW (344 PS; 339 bhp)	5.8 — 5.6 sec. (sedan) 5.9 — 5.8 sec. (avant) 6.2 — 5.9 sec. (cabrio.)	155 mph (250 km/h)	4 dr, 5 seat Saloon (sedan) 5 dr, 5 seat Avant (estate/wagon) 2 dr, 4 seat Cabriolet (convertible)	1,660 – 1,895 kg	2005–2008, 2006–2009 (Cabrio.)	
Audi S6	C6	4F	5,204 cc V10 FSI (Lamborghini V10)	320 kW (435 PS; 429 bhp)	5.2 sec. (sedan) 5.3 sec. (avant)	155 mph (250 km/h)	4 dr, 5 seat Saloon (sedan) 5 dr, 5 seat Avant (estate/wagon)	1,910 kg 1,970 kg	2006–2011	
Audi RS 6	C6	4F	4,991 cc V10 TFSI (Lamborghini V10)	427 kW (581 PS; 573 bhp)	4.6 sec.	155 mph (250 km/h) 188 mph (303 km/h) (Plus)	4 dr, 5 seat Saloon (sedan) 5 dr, 5 seat Avant (estate/wagon)	1985  – 2,025 kg	2008–2010	
Audi S8	D3 (PL63)	4E	5,204 cc V10 FSI (Lamborghini V10)	331 kW (450 PS; 444 bhp)	5.1 sec.	155 mph (250 km/h)	4 dr, 5 seat Saloon (sedan)	1,940 kg	2006–2010	
Audi S4	B8	8E	2,998 cc V6 TFSI	245 kW (333 PS; 329 bhp)	5.3 — 5.1 sec. (sedan) 5.4 — 5.2 sec. (avant)	155 mph (250 km/h)	4 dr, 5 seat Saloon (sedan) 5 dr, 5 seat Avant (estate/wagon)	1,725  – 1,825 kg	2009–2011	
Audi S3	A5 (PQ35)	8P	1,984 cc I4 TFSI	195 kW (265 PS; 261 bhp)	5.7 sec.	155 mph (250 km/h)	3 dr, 5 seat Hatchback 5 dr, 5 seat Hatchback	1,530  - 1,590 kg	2006–2012 2008–2012	
Audi RS 3 Sportback	A5 (PQ35)	8P	2,480 cc R5 TFSI	250 kW (340 PS; 335 bhp)	4.6 sec.	155 mph (250 km/h)	5 dr, 5 seat Hatchback	1,650 kg	2011–2012	
Audi S8	D4	4H	3,993 cc V8 TFSI	382 kW (519 PS; 512 bhp)	4.2 sec.	155 mph (250 km/h)	4 dr, 5 seat Saloon (sedan)	2,050 – 2,065 kg	2012–2018	
Audi TTS	A5 (PQ35)	8J	1,984 cc I4 TFSI	200 kW (272 PS; 268 bhp)	5.4 — 5.2 sec. (coupé) 5.6 — 5.4 sec. (roadster)	155 mph (250 km/h)	2 dr, 2 seat compact Coupé 2 dr, 2 seat compact Roadster (convertible)	1,470 – 1,570 kg	2008–2014	
Audi TT RS	A5 (PQ35)	8J	2,480 cc R5 TFSI	250–265 kW (340–360 PS; 335–355 bhp)	4.6 — 4.3 sec. (coupé) 4.7 — 4.4 sec. (roadster) 4.3 — 4.1 sec. (coupé) (plus) 4.4 — 4.2 sec. (roadster) (plus)	155 mph (250 km/h) 174 mph (280 km/h) (plus)	2 dr, 2 seat compact Coupé 2 dr, 2 seat compact Roadster (convertible)	1,525 – 1,610 kg	2009–2014	
Audi S3	MQB	8V	1,984 cc I4 TFSI	221–228 kW (300–310 PS; 296–306 bhp)	4.7 sec.	160 mph (250 km/h)	5 dr, 5 seat Hatchback 4 dr, 5 seat Saloon (sedan); 2 dr, 4 seat Cabriolet	1,595 kg	2013–2020	
Audi RS 3	MQB	8V	2,480 cc R5 20v TFSI	270–294 kW (367–400 PS; 362–394 bhp)	4.3–3.8 sec.	174 mph (280 km/h)	5 dr, 5 seat Hatchback 4 dr 5 seat Saloon (sedan)	1,595 kg	2015–2020 (Sportback); 2017 — 2020 (Sedan)	
Audi S4	B8 (PL48) (Audi MLB/MLP)	8K	2,998 cc V6 TFSI	245 kW (333 PS; 329 bhp)	5.1 sec.	155 mph (250 km/h)	4 dr, 5 seat Saloon (sedan) 5 dr, 5 seat Avant (estate/wagon)	1,725 – 1,825 kg	2012–2015	
Audi S5	B8 (PL48) (Audi MLB/MLP)	8T	2,998 cc V6 TFSI; 4,163 cc V8 FSI	245 kW (333 PS; 329 bhp); 260 kW (354 PS; 349 bhp)	5.6 — 4.4 sec.	155 mph (250 km/h)	2 dr, 4 seat mid—size Coupé 2 dr, 4 seat Cabriolet (convertible) 5 dr, 4 seat Sportback (fastback)	1,750 kg 1,955 kg 1,820 kg	2007 2011 (facelift)	
Audi RS 5	B8 (PL48) (Audi MLB/MLP)	8T	4,163 cc V8 FSI	331 kW (450 PS; 444 bhp)	4.6 sec. (2010) 4.5 sec. (2012) 4.9 sec. (2012 – ...) (cabriolet)	250 km/h 280 km/h (with raised speed limiter)	2 dr, 4 seat mid—size Coupé 2 dr, 4 seat Cabriolet (convertible)	1,790 –1,800 kg 1,995 kg	2010-2017	
Audi RS 4	B8 (PL48) (Audi MLB/MLP)	8K	4,163 cc V8 FSI	331 kW (450 PS; 444 bhp)	4.7 sec.	174 mph (280 km/h)	5 dr, 5 seat Avant (estate/wagon)	1,795 kg	2012–2015	
Audi SQ5	MLB	8R	2,995 cc V6 TFSI 2,967 cc V6 TDI	260 kW (354 PS; 349 bhp); 230–250 kW (313–340 PS; 308–335 bhp)	5.4 sec. (gasoline) 5.1 sec. (diesel)	155 mph (250 km/h)	4 dr, 5 seat Crossover	1,830 kg	2013	
Audi RS Q3	A5 (PQ35)	8U	2,485 cc R5 TFSI	228 kW (310 PS; 306 bhp) (2013) 250 kW (340 PS; 335 bhp) (2014) 270 kW (367 PS; 362 bhp) (performance)	5.2 sec. (2013) 4.8 sec. (2014)	155 mph (250 km/h)	4 dr, 5 seat Crossover	1,655 kg	2013–2016	
Audi S6	C7	4G	3,993 cc V8 TFSI	331 kW (450 PS; 444 bhp)	4.9 / 4.8 sec. (2012) (avant/sedan) 4.6 / 4.4 sec. (2014) (avant/sedan)	155 mph (250 km/h)	4 dr, 5 seat Saloon (sedan) 5 dr, 5 seat Avant (estate/wagon)	1,970 kg 2,035 kg	2012 2014 (facelift)	
Audi RS 6 Avant	MLB	4G	3,993 cc V8 TFSI	412 kW (560 PS; 553 bhp); 445 kW (605 PS; 597 bhp) (performance)	3.9 sec. 3.7 sec. (performance)	190 mph (305 km/h)	5 dr, 5 seat Avant (estate/wagon)	2,025 kg	2014 2015–2018 (facelift) 2016 (performance)	
Audi S7	MLB	4G	3,993 cc V8 TFSI	309 kW (420 PS; 414 bhp) 331 kW (450 PS; 444 bhp)	4.7 sec. (2012) 4.6 sec. (2014)	155 mph (250 km/h)	5 dr, 4 seat Sportback (fastback)	2,030 kg	2012 2014 (facelift)	
Audi RS 7	MLB	4G	3,993 cc V8 TFSI	412 kW (560 PS; 553 bhp); 445 kW (605 PS; 597 bhp) (performance)	3.9 sec. 3.7 sec. (performance)	190 mph (305 km/h)	5 dr, 4 seat Sportback (fastback)	2,005 kg	2013 2014–2018 (facelift) 2016 (performance)	
Audi S1	PQ25	8X	1,984 cc I4 TFSI	170 kW (231 PS; 228 bhp)	5.8 sec.	155 mph (250 km/h)	3 dr, 5 seat Supermini 5 dr, 5 seat Supermini (sportback)	1,315 kg	2015–2018	
Audi TTS	MQB	8S	1,984 cc I4 TFSI	228 kW (310 PS; 306 bhp)	4.5 sec. (Coupé) 4.8 sec. (Roadster)	155 mph (249 km/h)	2 dr, 2 seat compact Coupé 2 dr, 2 seat compact Roadster (convertible)	1,480 kg (3,263 lb) 1,570 kg (3,461 lb)	2014—2023	
Audi TT RS	MQB	8S	2,480 cc I5 20v TFSI	294 kW (400 PS; 394 bhp)	3.7 sec. (Coupé) 3.9 sec. (Roadster)	174 mph (280 km/h)	2 dr, 2 seat compact Coupé 2 dr, 2 seat compact Roadster (convertible)	1,515 kg (3,340 lb) 1,605 kg (3,538 lb)	2016—2023	
Audi S4	B9 (PL48) (Audi MLB/MLP)	8W	2,967 cc V6 TDI 2,995 cc V6 TFSI	255 kW (347 PS; 342 bhp)	4.6 sec. (saloon) 4.9 sec. (Avant)	155 mph (249 km/h)	4 dr, 5 seat Saloon (sedan) 5 dr, 5 seat Avant (estate/wagon)	1,860 kg (4,101 lb) 1,900 kg (4,189 lb)	2017—2024	
Audi S5	MLB Evo	F5	2,967 cc V6 TDI 2,995 cc V6 TFSI	255 kW (347 PS; 342 bhp)	4.8 sec. (Coupé) 4.4 sec. (Sportback) 5.1 sec. (Cabriolet)	155 mph (249 km/h)	2 dr, 4 seat mid-size Coupé 5 dr, 4 seat Sportback (fastback) 2 dr, 4 seat mid-size Cabriolet	1,835 kg (4,045 lb) 1,870 kg (4,123 lb) 1,915 kg (4,222 lb)	2017—2024	
Audi RS 4 Avant	MLB Evo	B9	2,894 cc V6 TFSI	331 kW (450 PS; 444 bhp)	4.1 sec.	155 mph (249 km/h) 174 mph (280 km/h)	5 dr, 5 seat Avant (estate/wagon)	1,820 kg (4,012 lb)	2017—2024	
Audi RS 5	MLB Evo	F5	2,894 cc V6 TFSI	331 kW (450 PS; 444 bhp)	3.9 sec.	174 mph (280 km/h)	2 dr, 4 seat mid-size Coupé 5 dr, 4 seat Sportback (fastback)	1,782 kg (3,929 lb) 1,817 kg (4,006 lb)	2017—2024	
Audi SQ5 & SQ5 Sportback	MLB Evo	FY	2,967 cc V6 TDI 2,995 cc V6 TFSI	257 kW (349 PS; 345 bhp)	5.1 sec.	155 mph (249 km/h)	4 dr, 5 seat Crossover	2,055 kg (4,530 lb)	2017—2024	
Audi SQ8 e-tron & SQ8 e-tron Sportback	MLB Evo		Electric	370 kW (503 PS; 496 bhp)	4.5 sec.	130 mph (209 km/h)	5 dr, 5 seat Crossover 5 dr, 5 seat Crossover (Sportback)	2,725 kg (6,008 lb)	2019—2023 (e-tron S); 2023—2025	
Audi S7	MLB Evo	C8	2,967 cc V6 TDI 2,894 cc V6 TFSI	257 kW (349 PS; 345 bhp)	5.1 sec.	155 mph (249 km/h)	5 dr, 4/5 seat Sportback (fastback)	2,085 kg (4,597 lb)	2019—2025	
Audi S6	MLB Evo	C8	2,967 cc V6 TDI 2,894 cc V6 TFSI	257 kW (349 PS; 345 bhp)	5.0 sec. (saloon) 5.1 sec. (Avant)	155 mph (249 km/h)	4 dr, 5 seat Saloon (sedan) 5 dr, 5 seat Avant (estate/wagon)	2,030 kg (4,475 lb) 2,095 kg (4,619 lb)	2019—2025	
Audi RS Q3 & RS Q3 Sportback	MQB A2	F3	2,480 cc I5 20v TFSI	294 kW (400 PS; 394 bhp)	4.5 sec.	155 mph (249 km/h)	5 dr, 5 seat Crossover 5 dr, 5 seat Crossover (Sportback)	1,790 kg (3,946 lb) 1,775 kg (3,913 lb)	2020—2025	
Audi RS 7	MLB Evo	C8	3,993 cc V8 TFSI	441 kW (600 PS; 591 bhp)	3.6 sec.	190 mph (306 km/h)	5 dr, 4/5 seat Sportback (fastback)	2,140 kg (4,718 lb)	2020—2025	
Audi RS 6 Avant	MLB Evo	C8	3,993 cc V8 TFSI	441 kW (600 PS; 591 bhp)	3.6 sec.	190 mph (306 km/h)	5 dr, 5 seat Avant (estate/wagon)	2,150 kg (4,740 lb)	2020—2025	
Audi S8	MLB Evo	D5	3,993 cc V8 TFSI	420 kW (571 PS; 563 bhp)	3.8 sec.	155 mph (249 km/h)	4 dr, 4/5 seat Saloon (sedan)	2,305 kg (5,082 lb)	2020—2026	
Audi SQ2	MQB	n/a	1,984 cc I4 TFSI	221 kW (300 PS; 296 bhp)	4.8 sec.	155 mph (249 km/h)	5 dr, 5 seat Crossover	1,585 kg (3,494 lb)	2019—2026	

== Audi S line ==
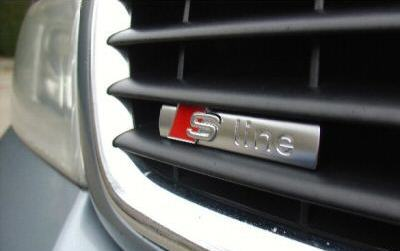
"S line" badge in front grille

Audi produce a specification of optional sports trim packages to their mainstream models A/Q/TT, known as the S line. This is merely a trim specification which allows customers to effect a sporty appearance in their mainstream Audi model. Whilst the specific S line trim parts are designed and produced by Audi Sport GmbH at its Neckarsulm factory, these mainstream cars are still manufactured and assembled by AUDI AG at their relevant factories on the same production lines alongside their other standard models.

Cars with S line trim are not to be confused with the specific high performance offerings — the "S" models (made by AUDI AG), and the "RS" models (made by Audi Sport GmbH); Audi cars with S line trim bear identical performance figures to their counterparts with base or SE trim levels.

== See also ==
- Audi Sport Quattro
- Audi 100 Coupé S
- Audi S1
- Audi S2
- Audi RS2
- Audi S3
- Audi RS3
- Audi S4
- Audi RS4
- Audi S5
- Audi RS5
- Audi S6
- Audi RS6
- Audi S7
- Audi RS 7
- Audi S8
- Audi R8
- Audi A8 W12
- Audi Q7 V12 TDI
- Audi Nuvolari
