= Audi RS 2 Avant =

Audi RS 2 Avant (8C)
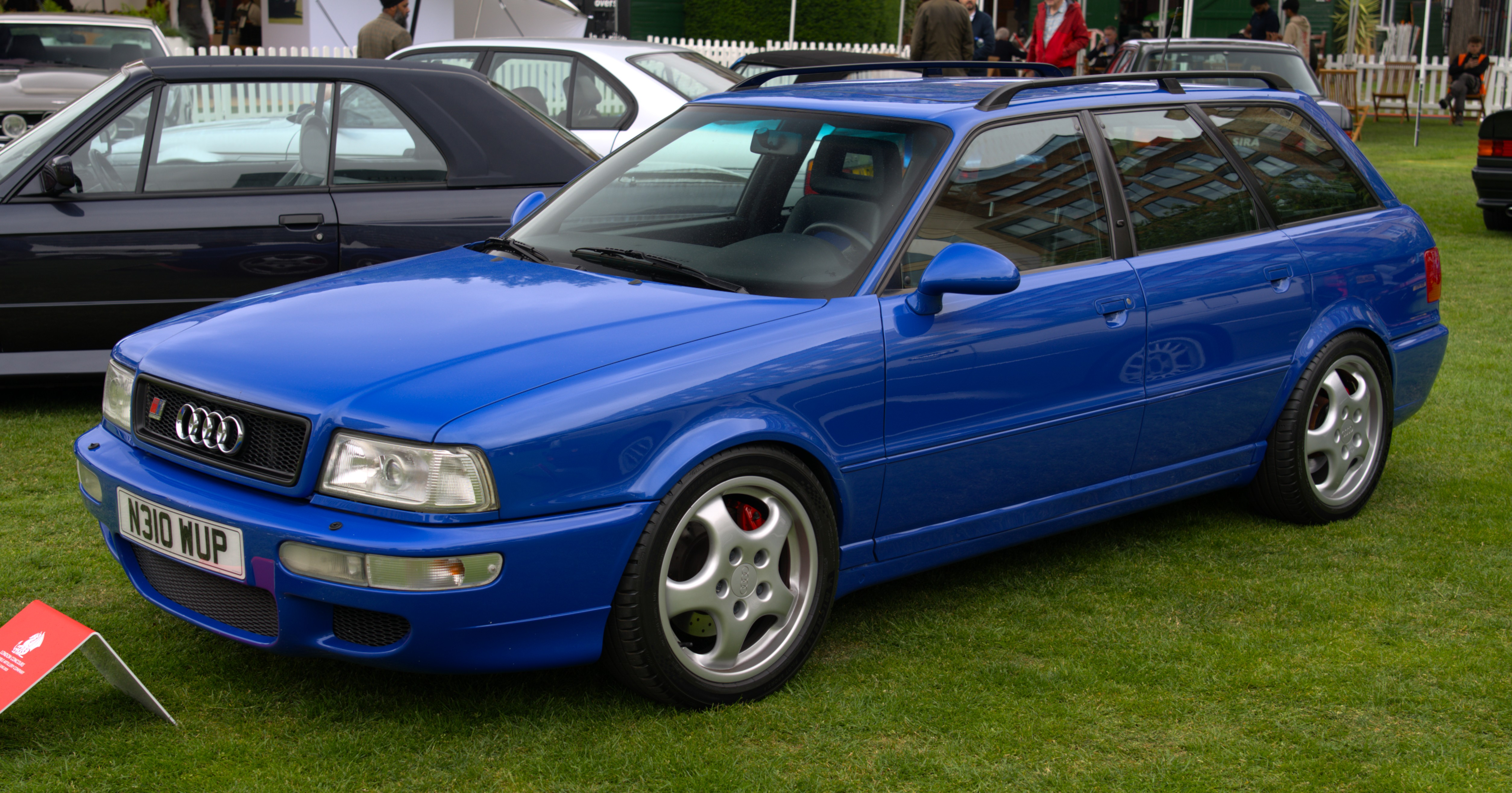

Overview
- Manufacturer: Audi and Porsche
- Production: March 1994 – July 1995
- Assembly: Germany: Zuffenhausen (Porsche)
- Designer: Michael Hölscher (Head of Project, Porsche)

Body and chassis
- Class: Compact executive car (D)
- Body style: 5-door estate car
- Layout: Longitudinal front engine, quattro permanent four-wheel drive
- Platform: Volkswagen Group B4 platform
- Related: Audi 80 (B4) Avant

Powertrain
- Engine: 2.2 I5 turbo limited to 7,500 rpm
- Power output: 315 PS (311 bhp; 232 kW)
- Transmission: 6-speed manual

Dimensions
- Wheelbase: 2,611 mm (102.8 in)
- Length: 4,580 mm (180.3 in)
- Width: 1,694 mm (66.7 in)

Chronology
- Successor: Audi RS 4

The Audi RS 2 Avant is a high-performance version of the Audi 80 Avant estate car, manufactured from March 1994 to July 1995. Collaboratively designed as a joint venture between Audi and Porsche and based on Audi's B4/8C platform, it received the internal designation of P1. It featured the most powerful version of Audi's inline-five cylinder turbocharged engine. It represents Audi's first "RS" model, and the first of their high-performance Avants.

The RS 2 Avant is a limited-edition model that was not widely exported outside of Europe, except in limited quanties to Hong Kong, South Africa, Brazil, and New Zealand. However, the RS 2 has amassed a cult following worldwide including Canada and the United States where the RS 2 was not officially imported due to certification costs and weak brand performance in the early 1990s. RS 2s have now been imported to Canada and USA as both allow non-conforming vehicles to be imported once they reach the age of 15 and 25 years respectively.

== Overview ==
The RS 2 was the product of a co-development project between Audi and Porsche, based on Audi's 80 Avant, and built on the Audi B4 platform. It was powered by a modified version of their 2,226 cc (2.2 L; 135.8 cu in) inline-five DOHC four valves per cylinder (20 valves total) turbocharged petrol engine (parts code prefix: 034, identification code: ADU). This internal combustion engine produced a motive power output of 315 PS (311 bhp; 232 kW) at 6500 rpm and 410 N⋅m (302 lb⋅ft) at 3000 rpm of torque. Although much of the car's underpinnings were manufactured by Audi, assembly was handled by Porsche at their Rossle-Bau plant in Zuffenhausen, Germany, which had become available after discontinuation of the Mercedes-Benz 500E, which Porsche had manufactured there under contract. The Rossle-Bau plant also produced the famous Porsche 959.

Like the rest of the vehicle, the RS 2's five-cylinder engine was based on a unit that Audi already produced, although Porsche considerably modified the engine; the standard KK&K turbocharger was switched for a larger unit, along with a heavy-duty intercooler and higher flow fuel injectors, a newly designed camshaft, a more efficient induction system, and a low-pressure exhaust system replaced the standard fare; a specially modified URS4/URS6 Bosch-supplied engine control unit (ECU) controlled the engine.

The RS 2 could accelerate from 0 to 100 km/h (62 mph) in 4.8 seconds, and achieve a maximum speed of 262 km/h (163 mph) (electronically restricted), despite weighing over 1,600 kg (3,500 lb). In a road test conducted in 1995, British car magazine Autocar timed the RS 2 from 0 to 30 mph (48 km/h) at just 1.5 seconds, which they confirmed was faster than the McLaren F1 road car. It could accelerate on-par with the 5th generation Chevrolet Corvette (C5) and a 996 generation Porsche 911.

A six-speed manual gearbox (parts code prefix: 01E, identification code: CRB) (gear ratios - 1st: 3.500, 2nd: 1.889, 3rd: 1.320, 4th: 1.034, 5th: 0.857, 6th: 0.711) was the only transmission choice. Audi's Torsen-based 'trademark' quattro permanent four-wheel drive system was standard. Front and rear final drive units contained a conventional 'open' differential, and have a ratio of 4.111, although the rear (parts code prefix: 01H, identification code: AZE) also has an electro-mechanical diff lock.

Porsche-designed braking and suspension systems replaced the standard Audi 80 equipment, however, the Bosch Anti-lock braking system (ABS) was retained. The front brakes feature either 304 millimetres (11.97 in) in diameter by 32 mm (1.260 in) thick radially ventilated disc brakes, and use Brembo four-opposed piston fixed calipers, or a 'modified' option of larger discs (which will only fit under a 17" wheel) of 322 mm (12.68 in) by 32 mm (1.260 in), with uprated brake pads. The rears featured 299 mm (11.77 in) by 24 mm (0.945 in) radially vented discs, again with Brembo four-piston calipers, and the 'modified' option included identical sized discs, but merely included cross-drilling, along with uprated pads. The hand brake worked on the rears, and consisted of a cable operated 'drum in disc' system.

40 millimetres (1.6 in) lower than a standard 80 Avant, the suspension and braking upgrades combined to give the RS 2 the handling and braking capabilities of a high-end sports car; 7.0Jx17 inch Porsche 'Cup' wheels, and high-performance 245/40 ZR17 Dunlop tyres were standard as well. In fact, the braking system wore Porsche-badged Brembo calipers, and both the wheels and side mirrors were identical in design to those of the 964 Turbo. Additionally, the word "PORSCHE" is inscribed in the RS 2 emblem affixed to the rear tailgate and front grille.

A three-spoke leather steering wheel, Recaro sports-bucket seats (available in full leather or a leather/suede combination), and console materials in either wood or carbon fiber trim rounded out the vehicle's interior changes. Audi's proprietary Safety Restraint System, procon-ten remained from its donor vehicle.

Approximately 2200 RS 2s were to be built initially, but due to demand the total was 2891 cars built. Of these, only 180 were right hand drive cars built for the UK, New Zealand and South African markets.

Audi also produced an S2, which was available both as an Avant (estate) and a Coupé, as well as saloon model with only 306 examples built. It featured a similar turbocharged 2,226 cm^{3} (135.8 cu in) five-cylinder engine which delivered 162 kW (220 PS; 217 bhp) (3B engine), or 169 kW (230 PS; 227 bhp) (ABY engine).

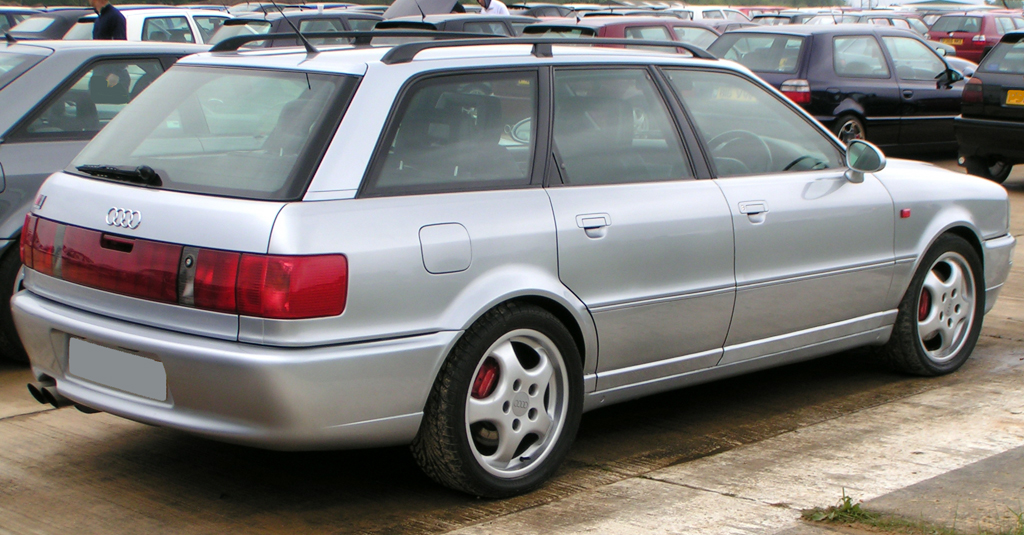
Audi RS 2 Avant rear

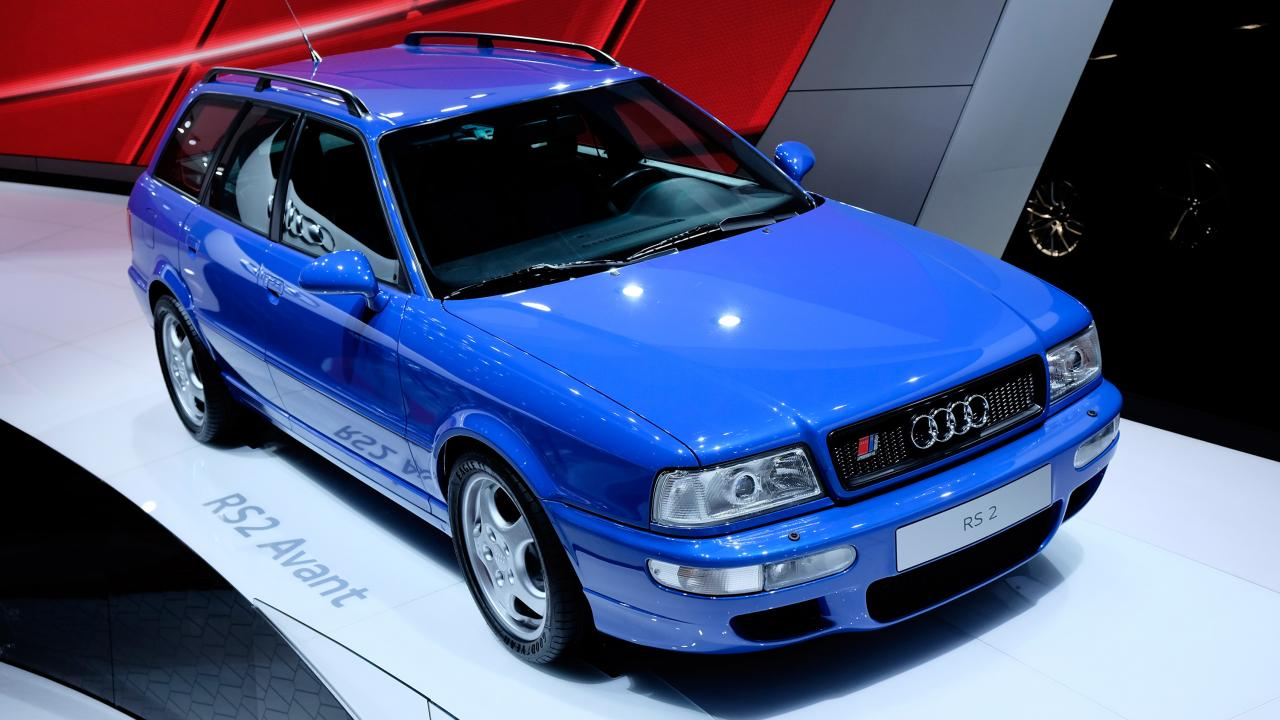
Audi RS 2 Avant at the Audi museum in Ingolstadt

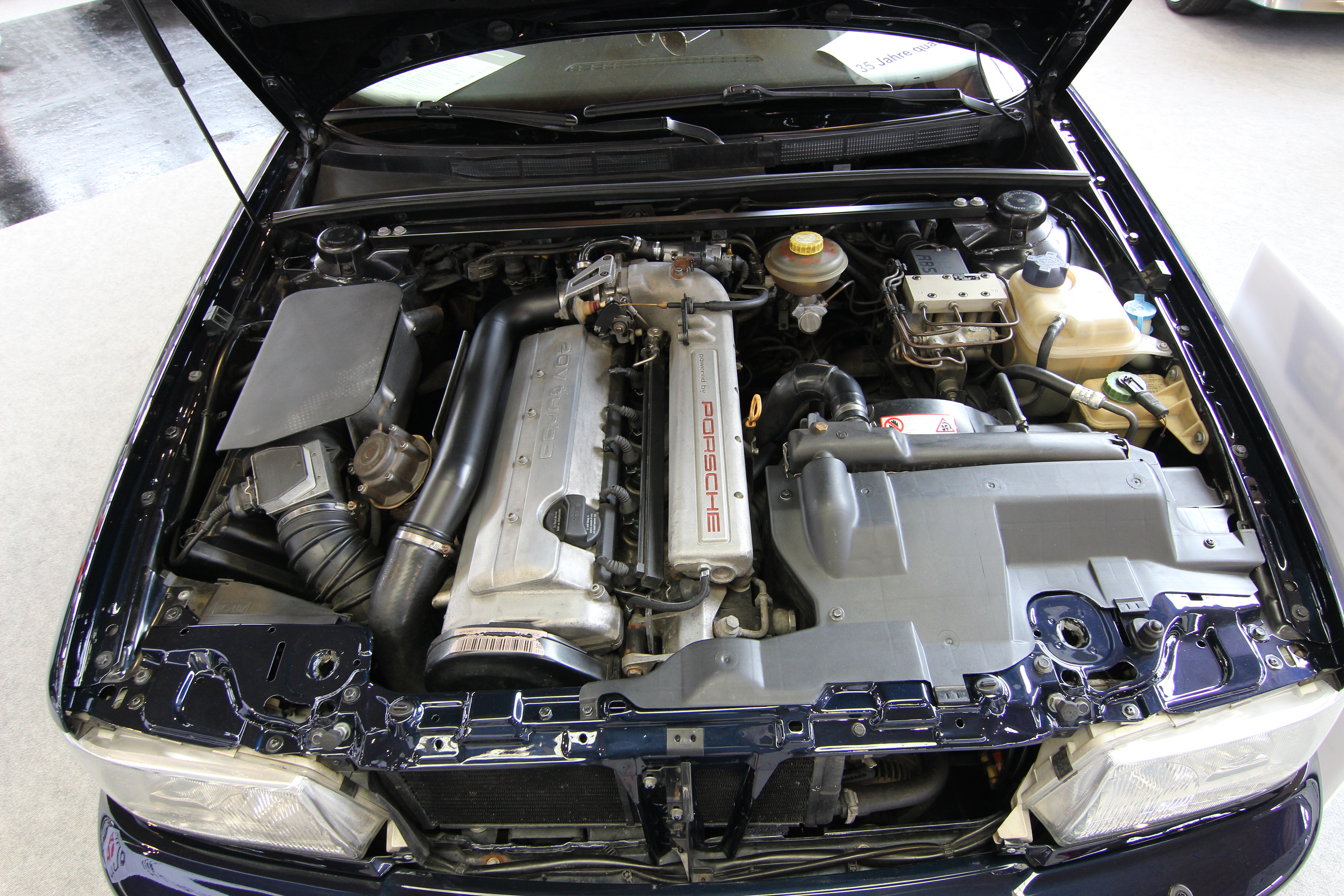
RS 2 Avant engine

== See also ==
- Audi S and RS models
