= Audi S8 =

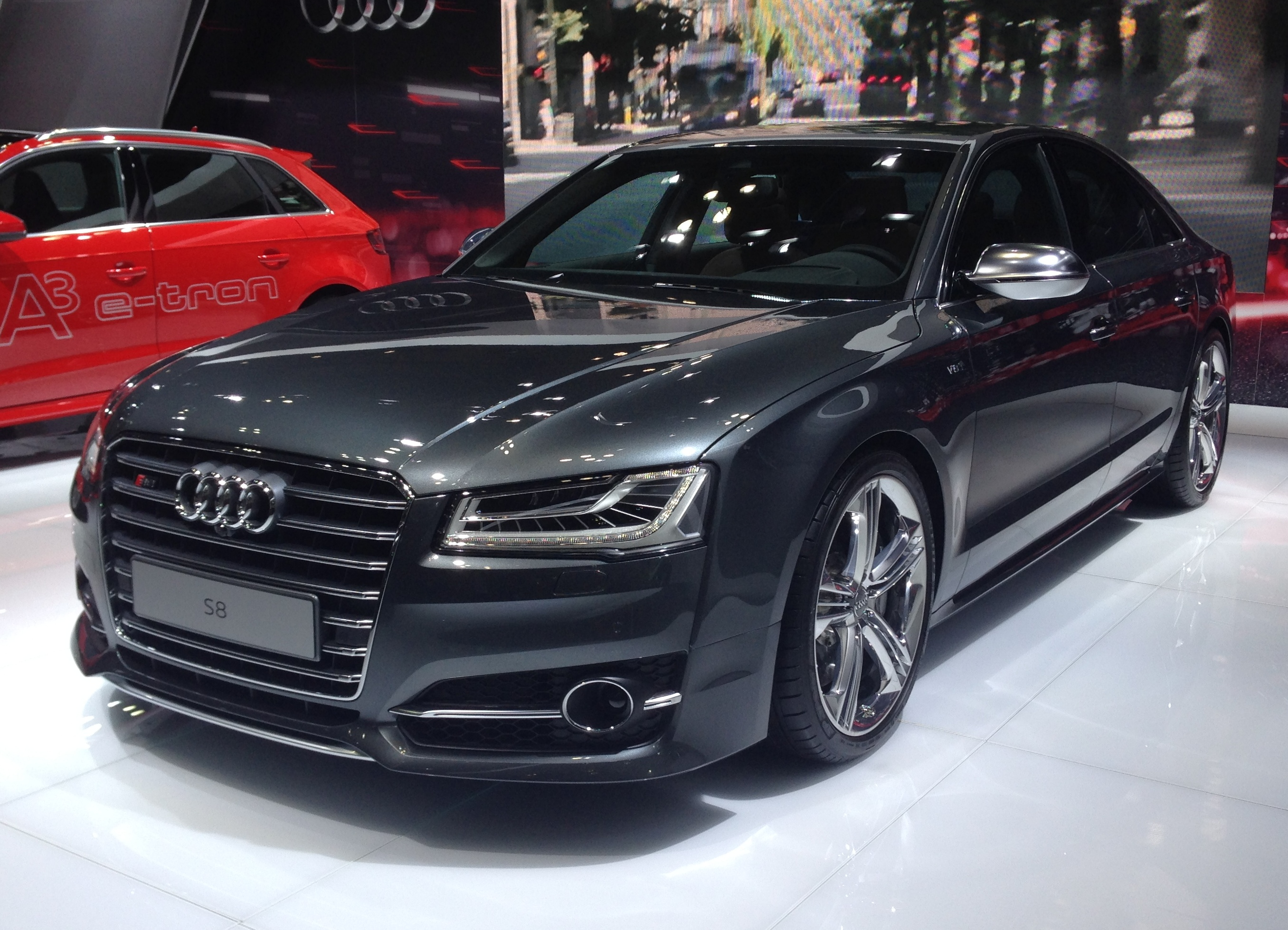
- Audi S8 at the 2013 Tokyo Motor Show

Overview
- Manufacturer: Audi Sport GmbH
- Production: 1996–2026
- Model years: 1996–2026
- Assembly: Germany: Neckarsulm

Body and chassis
- Class: Full-size luxury car (F)
- Body style: 4-door saloon
- Layout: Longitudinal F4 layout (quattro)
- Platform: Volkswagen Group D platform MLB
- Related: Audi A8; Bentley Flying Spur V8

Powertrain
- Engine: (D2) 4.2 L V8 (D3) 5.2 L V10 FSI (D4/D5) 4.0 L V8

Chronology
- Predecessor: Audi V8

The Audi S8 is a full-size luxury car produced by the German automaker Audi AG, manufactured by Audi Sport GmbH at the Neckarsulm plant, and part of Audi's S model range. The S8 is the high-performance version of the Audi A8, fitted standard with Audi's quattro all-wheel drive system, and was only offered with a short-wheelbase for the first three generations, being joined by a long-wheelbase variant option for the fourth generation.

== (D2) First generation ==
The Audi S8 (D2) was produced from 1996 to 2003. It is powered by a 4.2 liter V8 with 340 PS (250 kW; 335 hp), allowing it to accelerate from 0–60 mph (97 km/h) in 6.2 seconds. It has a curb weight of 1,730 kg (3,814 lb). In 1999, the car was updated with a power increase to 369 PS (271 kW; 364 hp), which brought the 0–60 mph (97 km/h) acceleration down to 5.6 seconds. Top speed was electronically limited to 155 mph (249 km/h). It has a curb weight of 1,845 kg (4,068 lb). An Audi S8 (D2) was chosen as the car of the protagonists of the film Ronin.

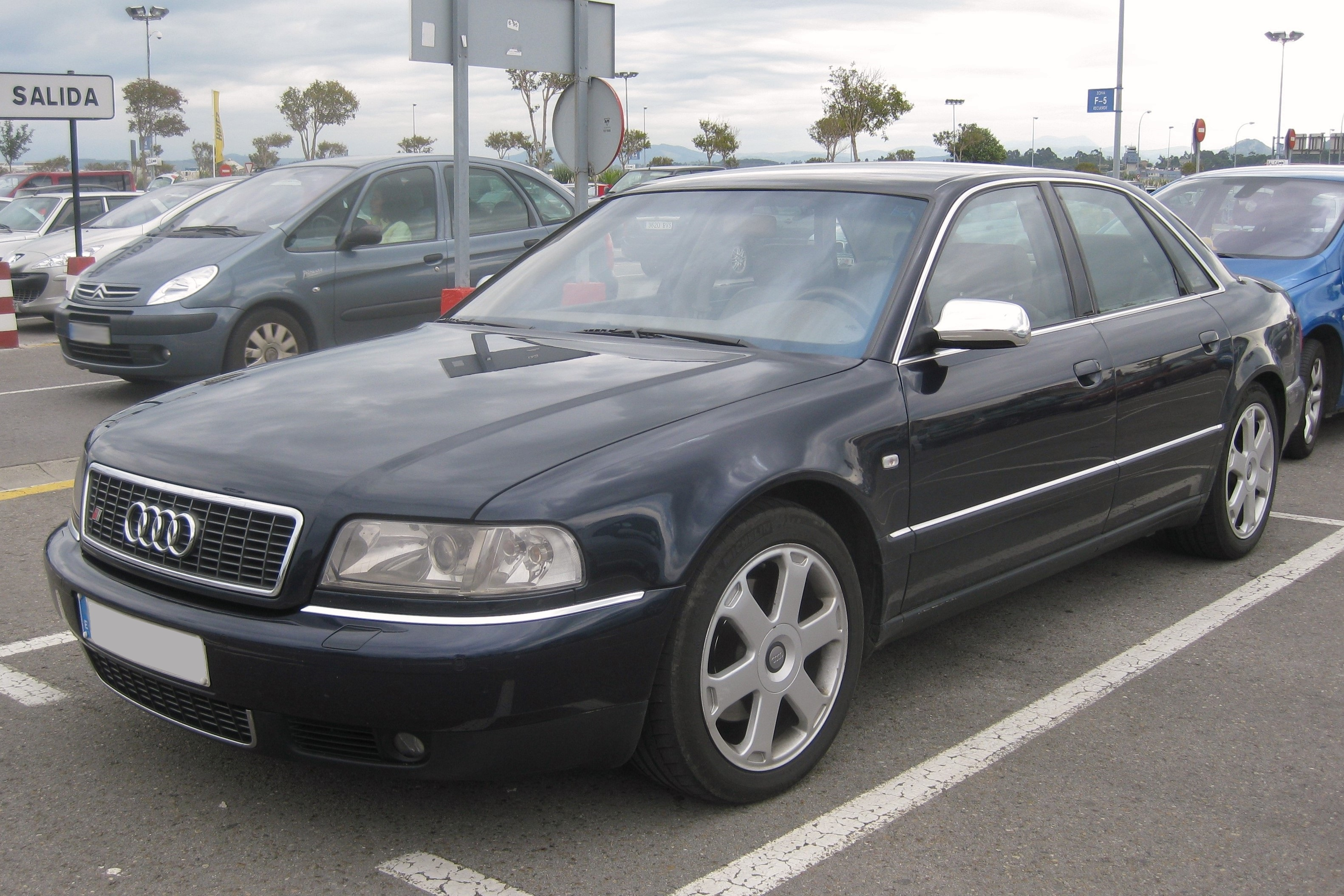
Audi S8 (D2)

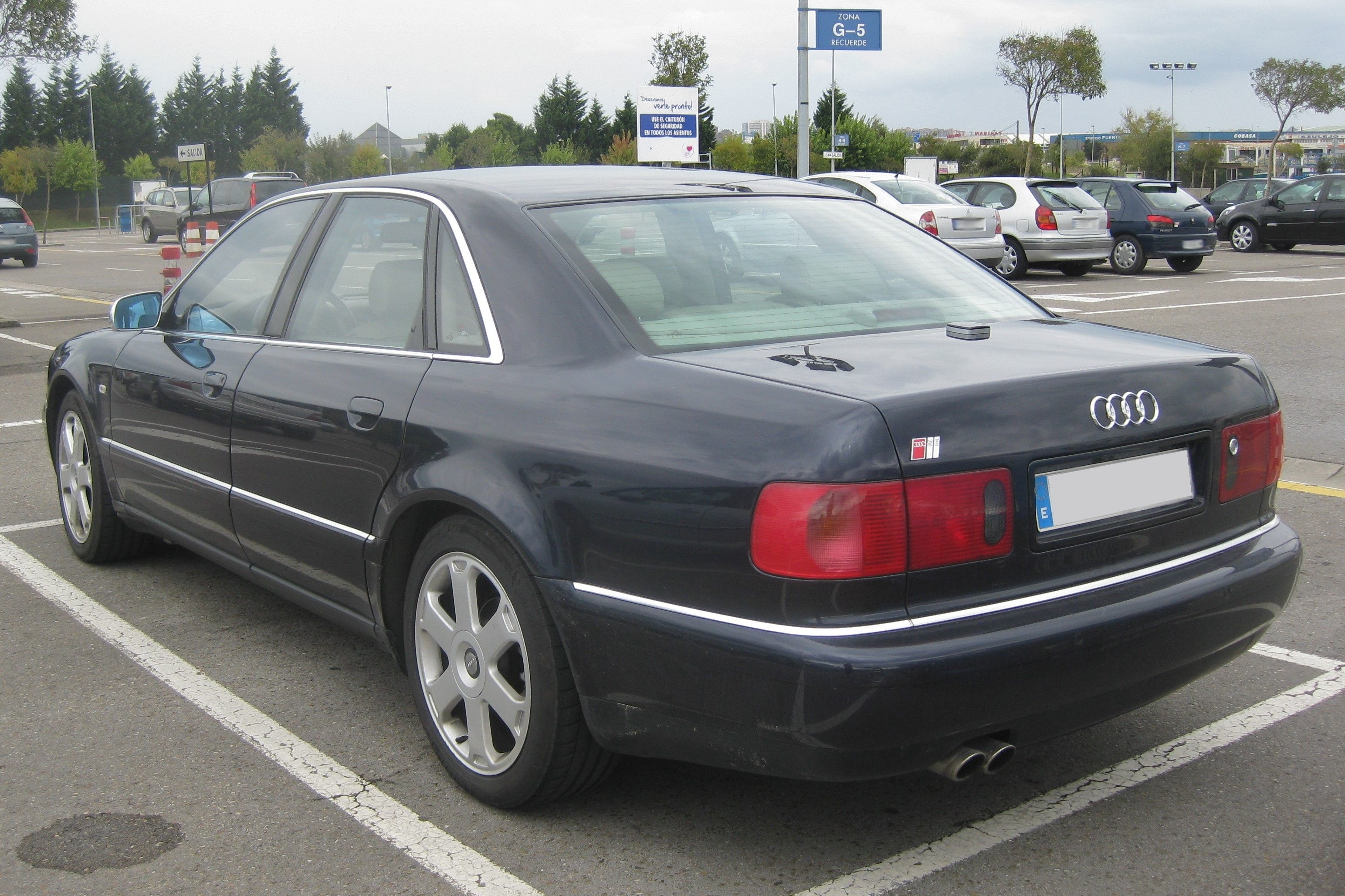

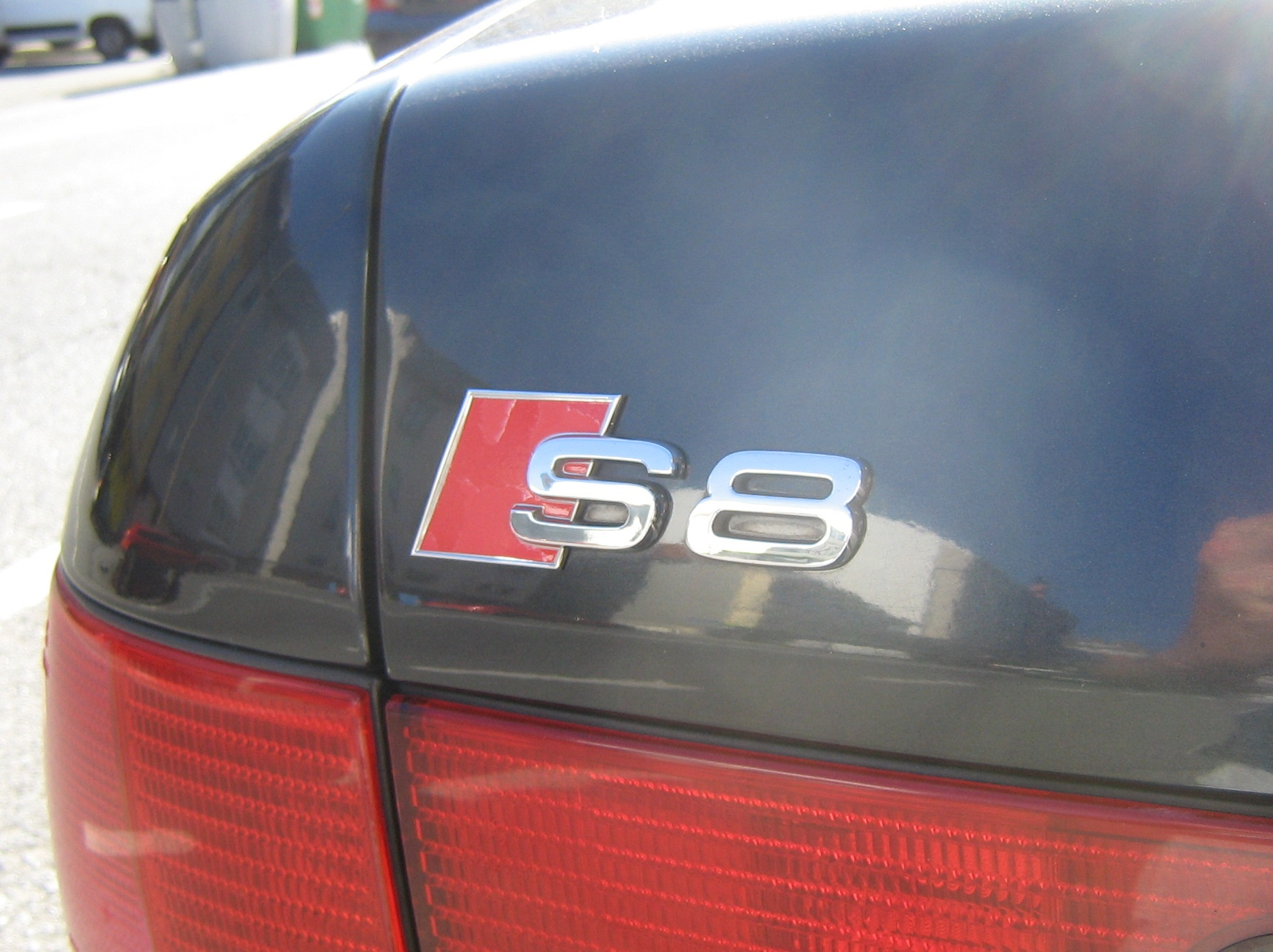
S8 logotype on the back of the first generation S8

== (D3) Second generation ==
Audi S8 (D3) was produced from 2006 to 2010. The car was powered by a modified version of the V10 engine found in the Lamborghini Gallardo of the same years. It produces 450 PS (331 kW; 444 hp), detuned by 50 PS (37 kW; 49 hp) from the Gallardo's power output of 500 PS (368 kW; 493 hp) with the purpose of increasing its fuel efficiency. The top speed is electronically limited to 155 mph (249 km/h) and acceleration from 0–60 mph (97 km/h) takes 5.1 seconds. It has a curb weight of 1,940 kg (4,277 lb).

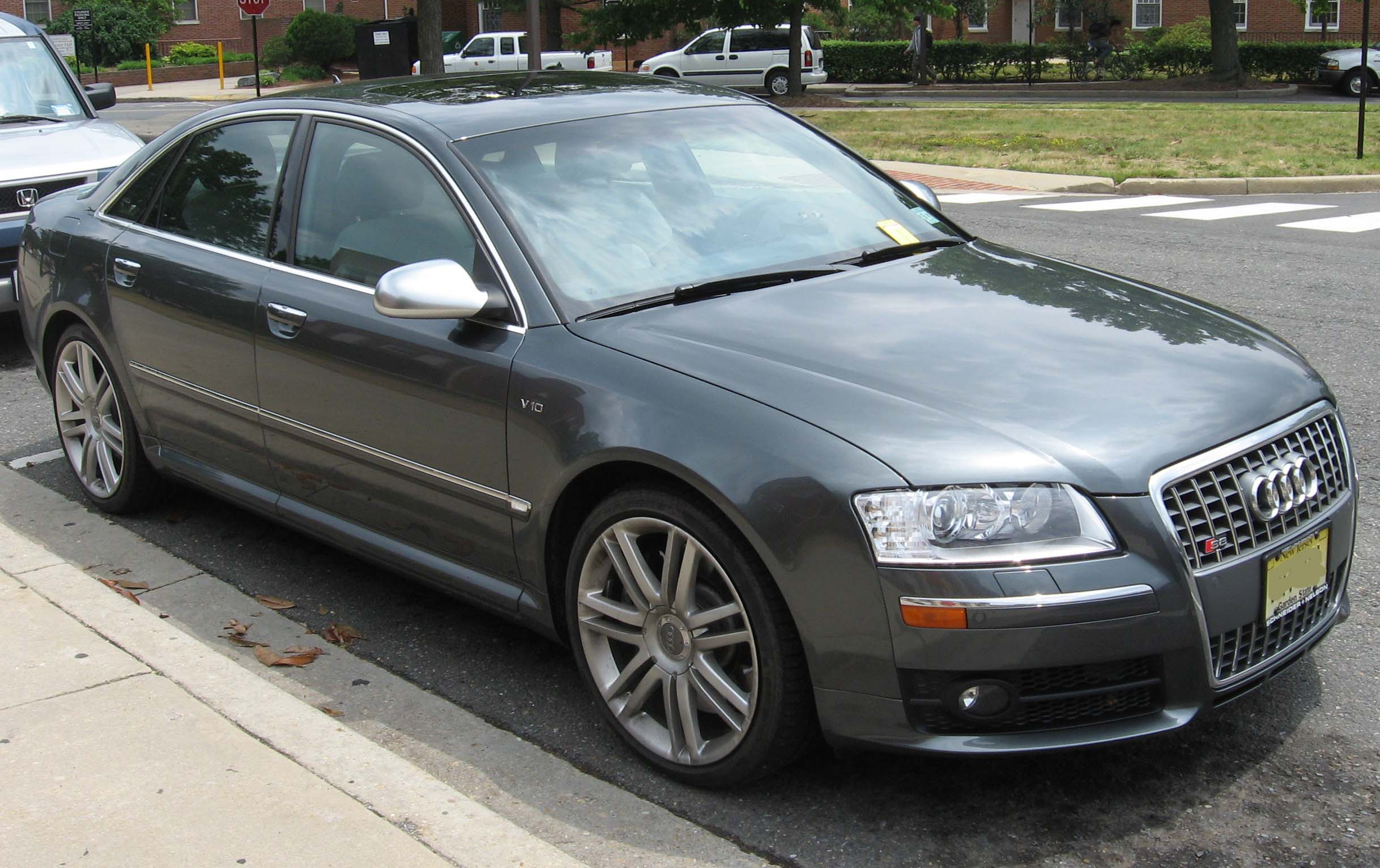
Audi S8 (D3)

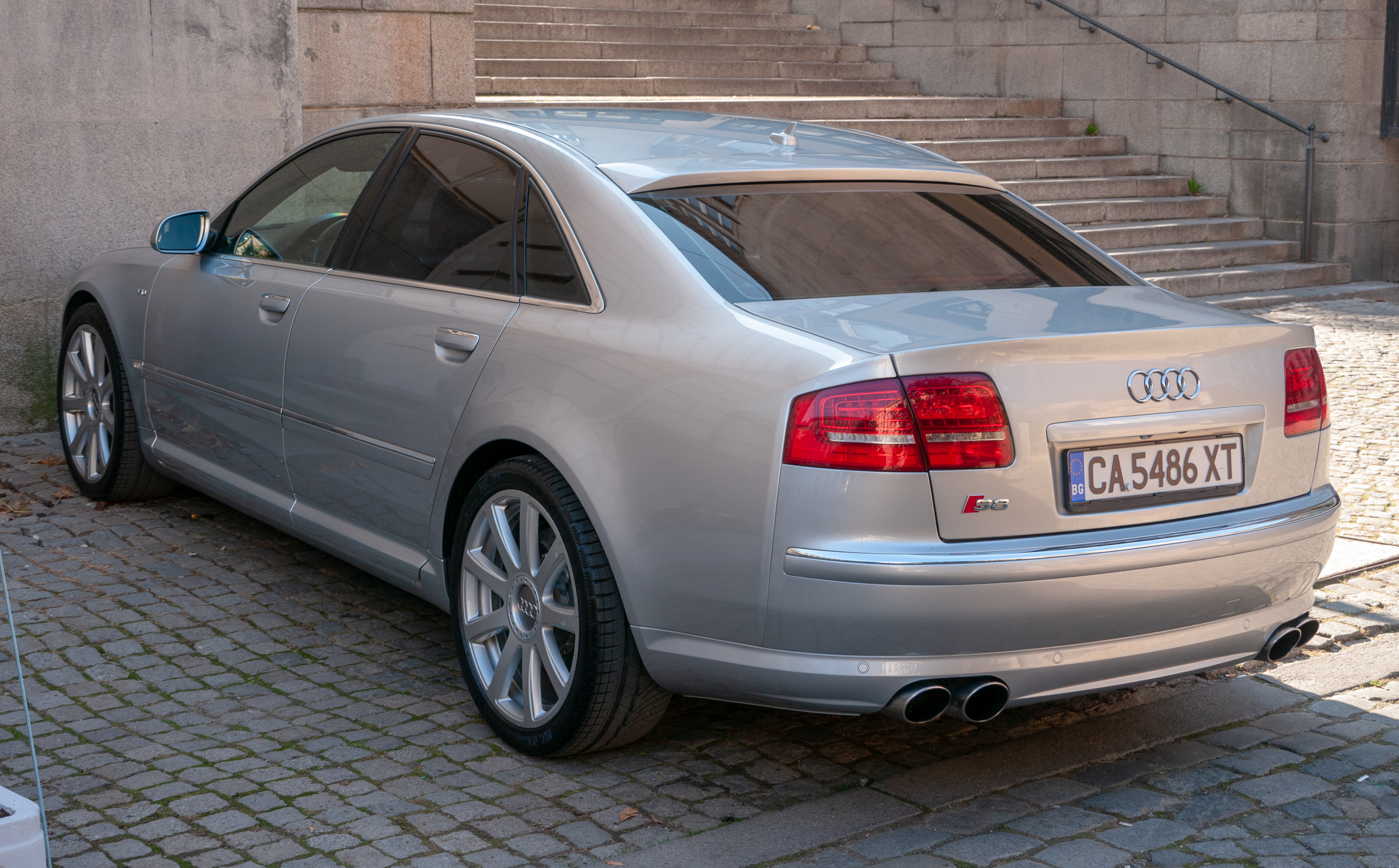

== (D4) Third generation ==
Audi S8 (D4) was produced from 2012 to 2018, with a mid-facelift in 2015. It is powered by a 3,993 V8 TFSI that produces 520 PS (382 kW; 513 hp). It can accelerate from 0-60 mph (97 km/h) in 3.6 seconds, complete the quarter mile in 11.9 seconds at 118 mph (190 km/h) and reach a top speed of 155 mph (249 km/h). Curb weight is 2,050–2,065 kg (4,519–4,553 lb).

Audi RS8 (D4.5) was a one off special edition inspired by Ferdinand Piëch. It's powered by the same 3,993 V8 but staged 1 tune to 680ps, can accelerate from 0-60 mph (97 km/h) in 3.1 seconds, complete the quarter mile in 10.9 seconds at 132mph

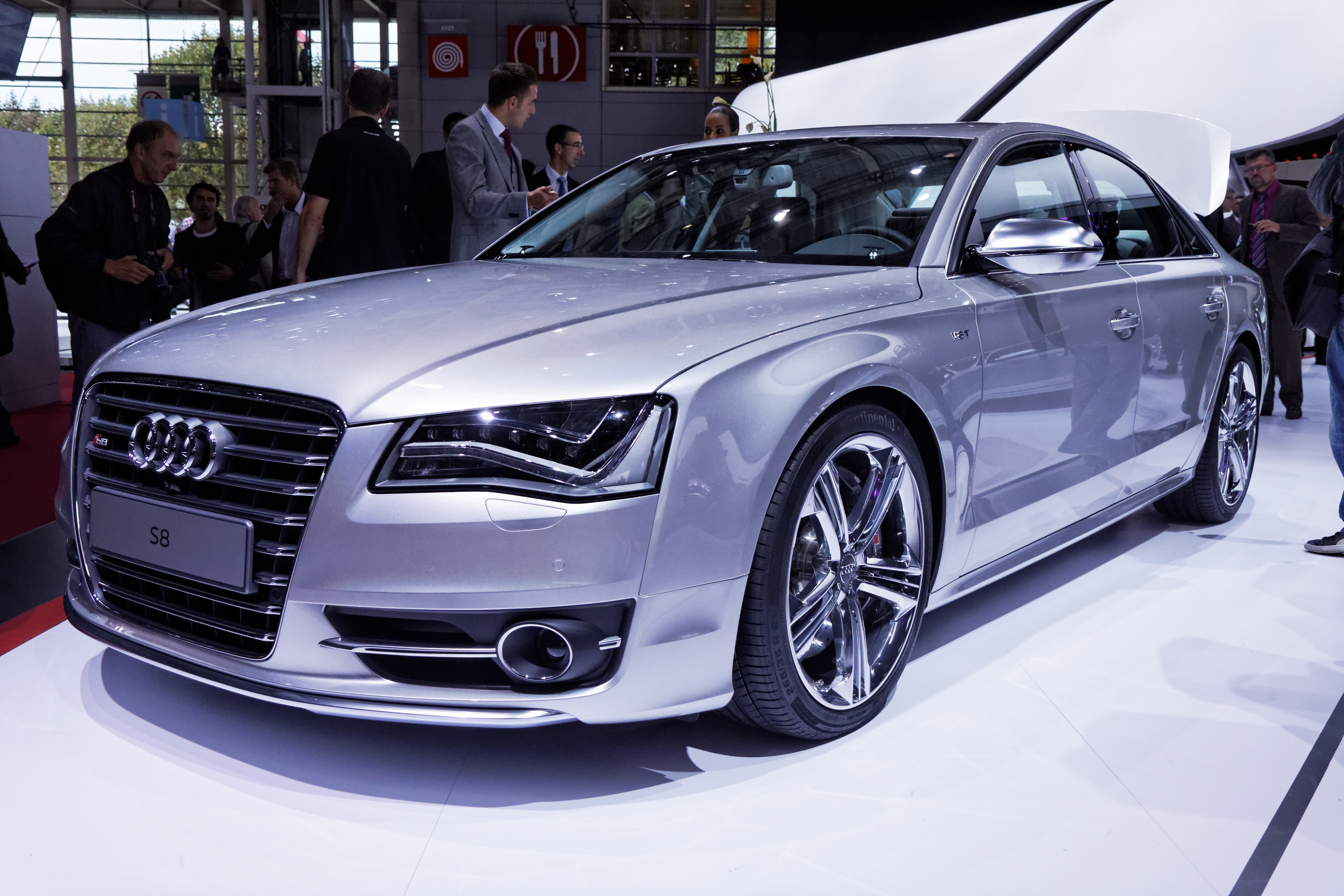
Audi S8 (D4)

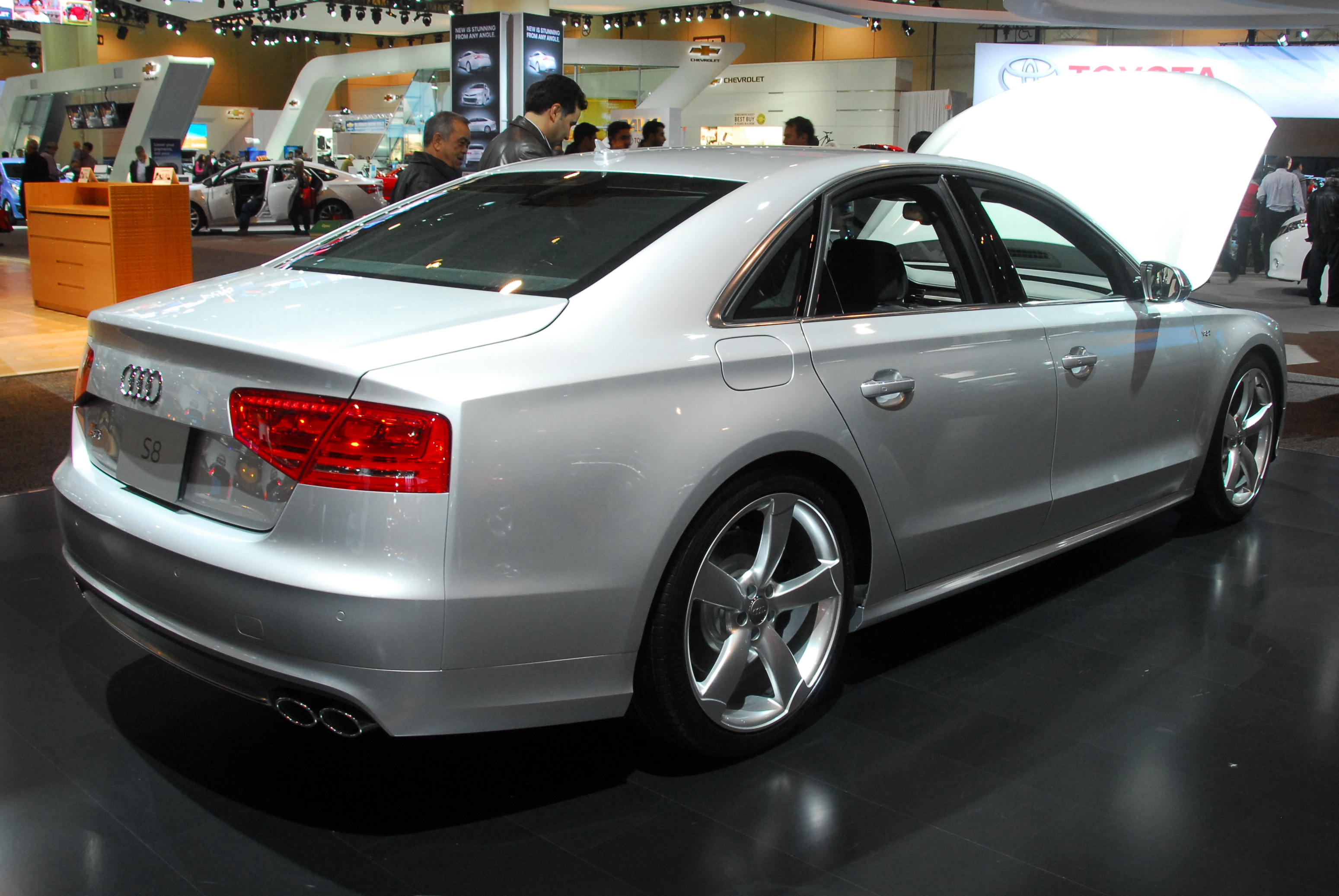

In 2016, the S8 plus version was launched with engine power increased to 605 PS (445 kW; 597 hp). Acceleration from 0–60 mph (97 km/h) takes 3.3 seconds, and with the Dynamic Package, it can reach a top speed of 190 mph (306 km/h). Unlike the regular S8, which was built by Audi on the regular assembly line alongside other A8 variants, the S8 Plus was built by Audi Sport (formerly Quattro GmbH) and has a VIN that starts with WUA to identify it.

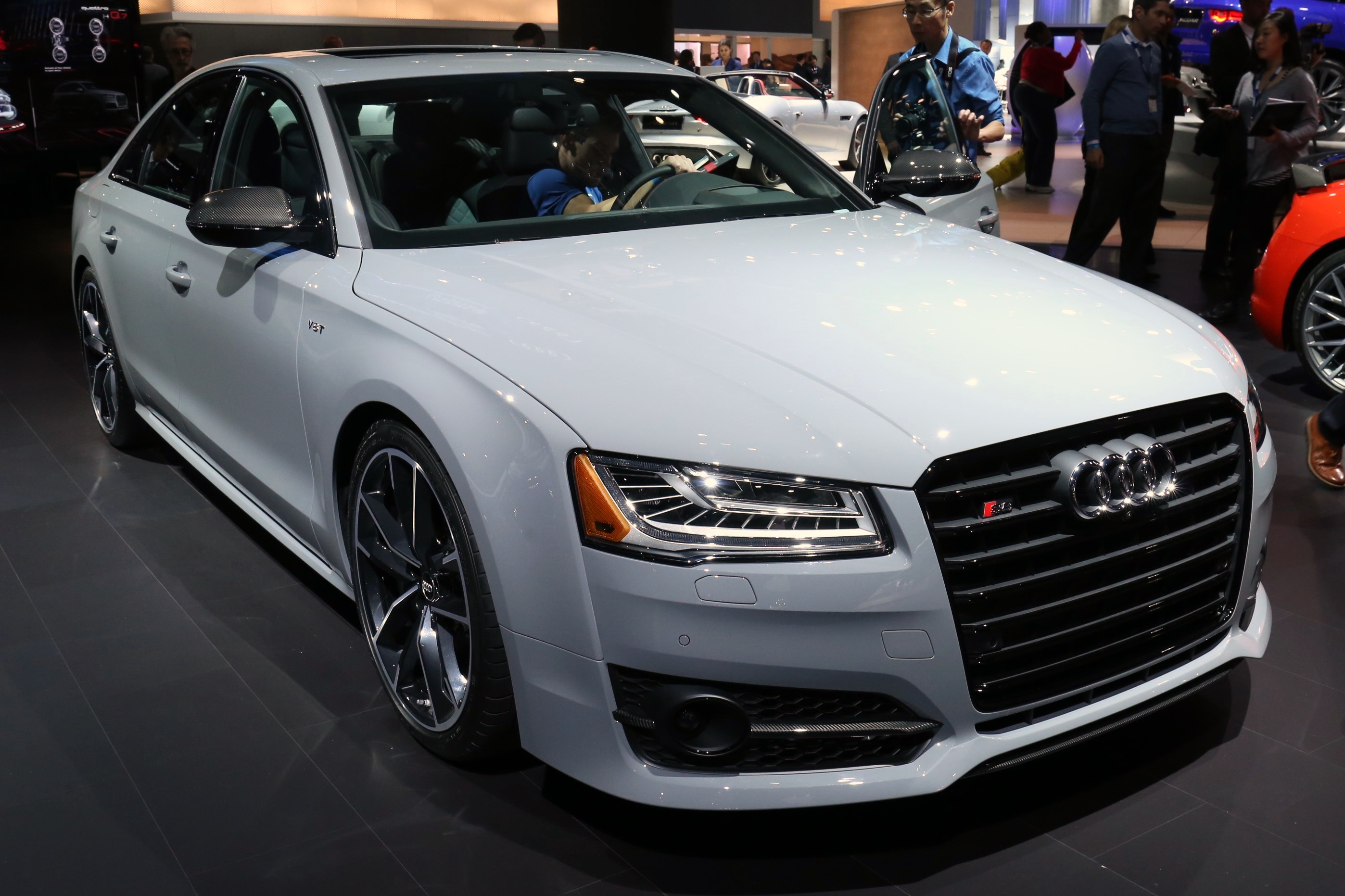
Audi S8 Plus

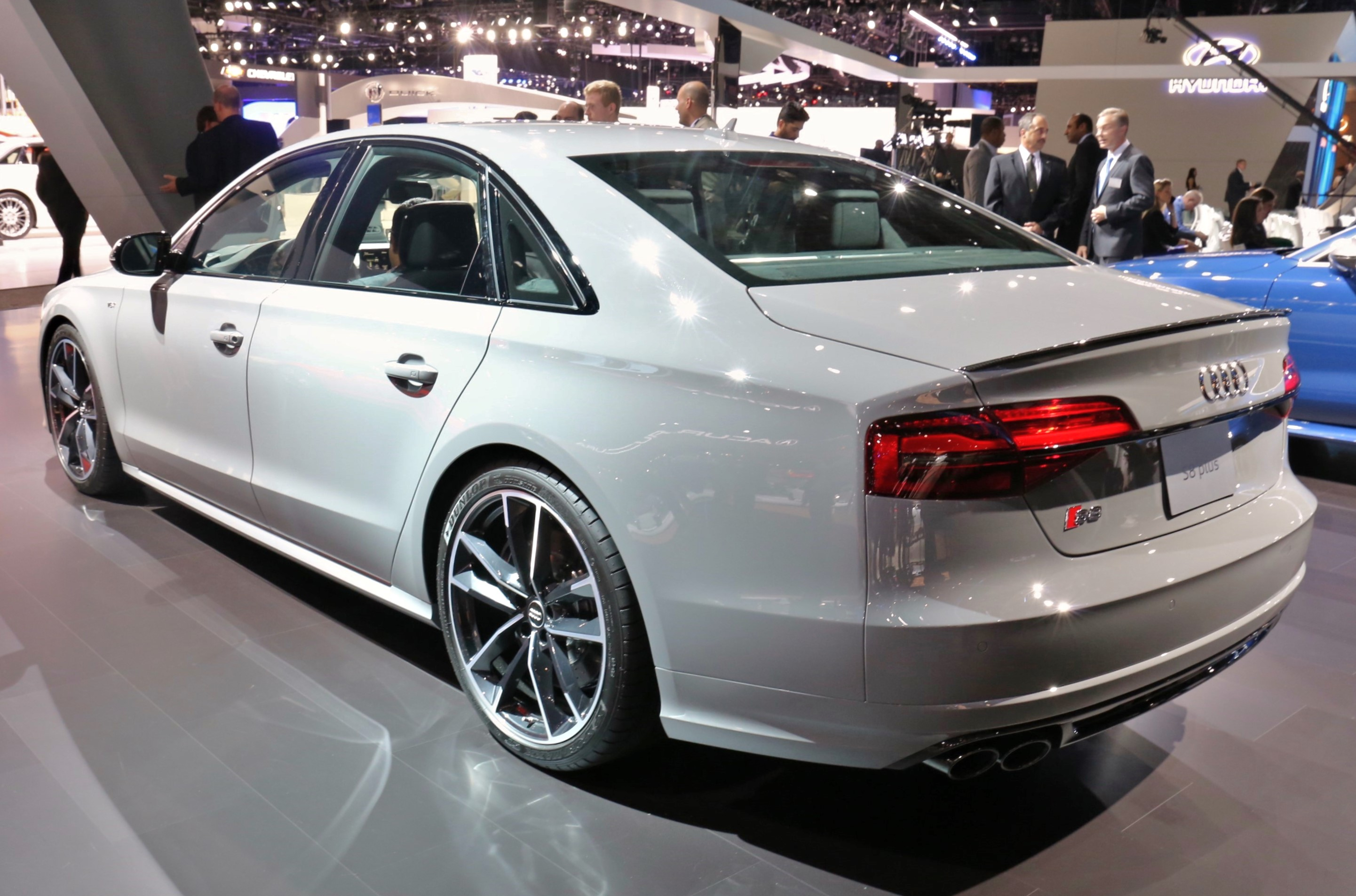

== (D5) Fourth generation ==
The release of the fourth generation S8 was planned to begin in 2019–2020. For the first time, it was to be offered in both short and long-wheelbase versions, with the long-wheelbase S8 (i.e., an S8L) being the sole variant offered in North America. The S8 is now the flagship of the Audi A8 range, since the nominally higher-end A8 L W12 was no longer offered after the 2018 model year.

The Audi S8 (D5) produces 563 hp (420 kW) and 590 lb⋅ft (800 N⋅m) of torque from its 4.0-liter twin-turbo V8. A 48-volt mild hybrid system will allow for stop-start use and coasting. Compared to the S8 plus (D4), the S8 (D5) has 34 hp (25 kW) less but 37 lb⋅ft (50 N⋅m) more torque.

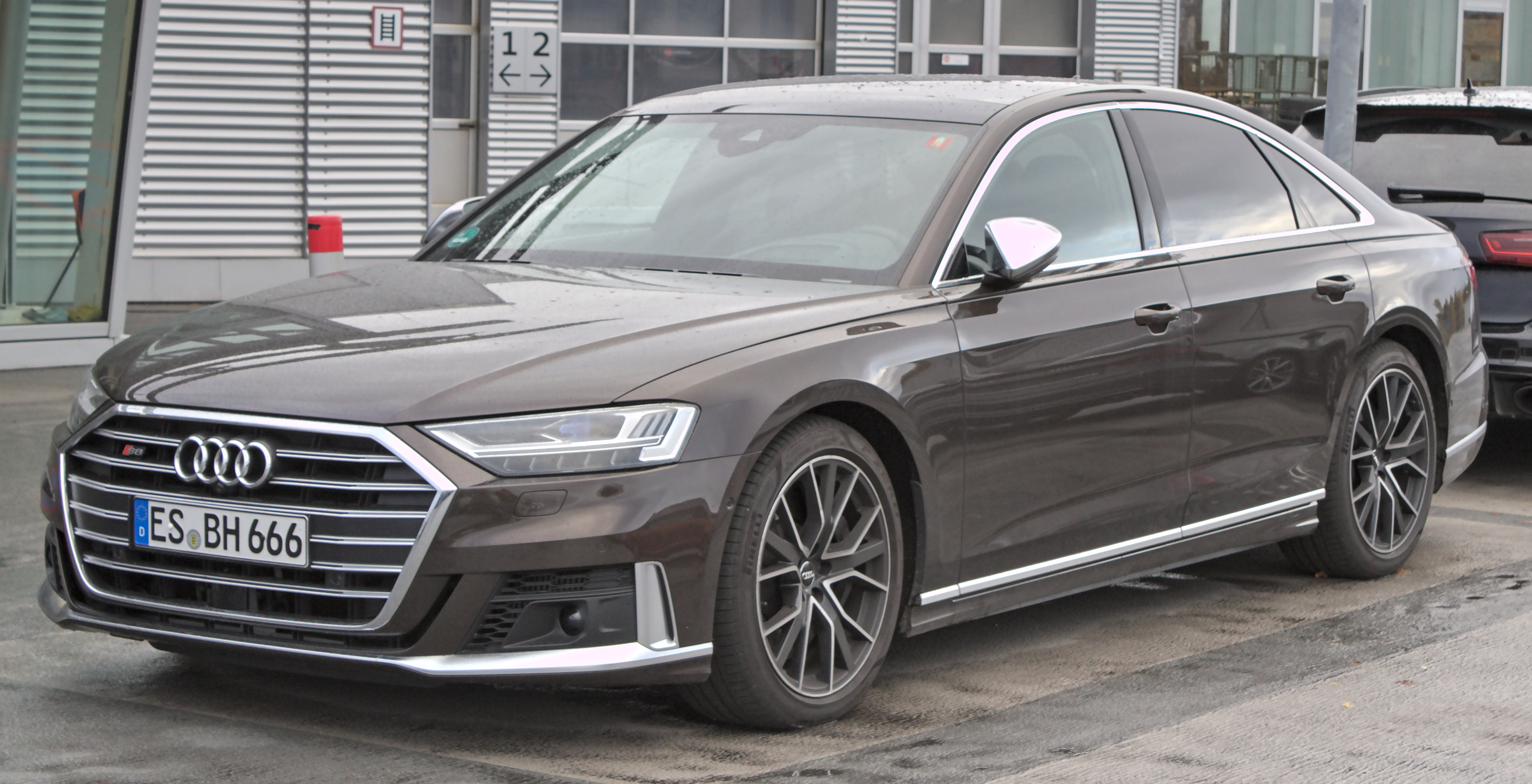
Audi S8 (D5)

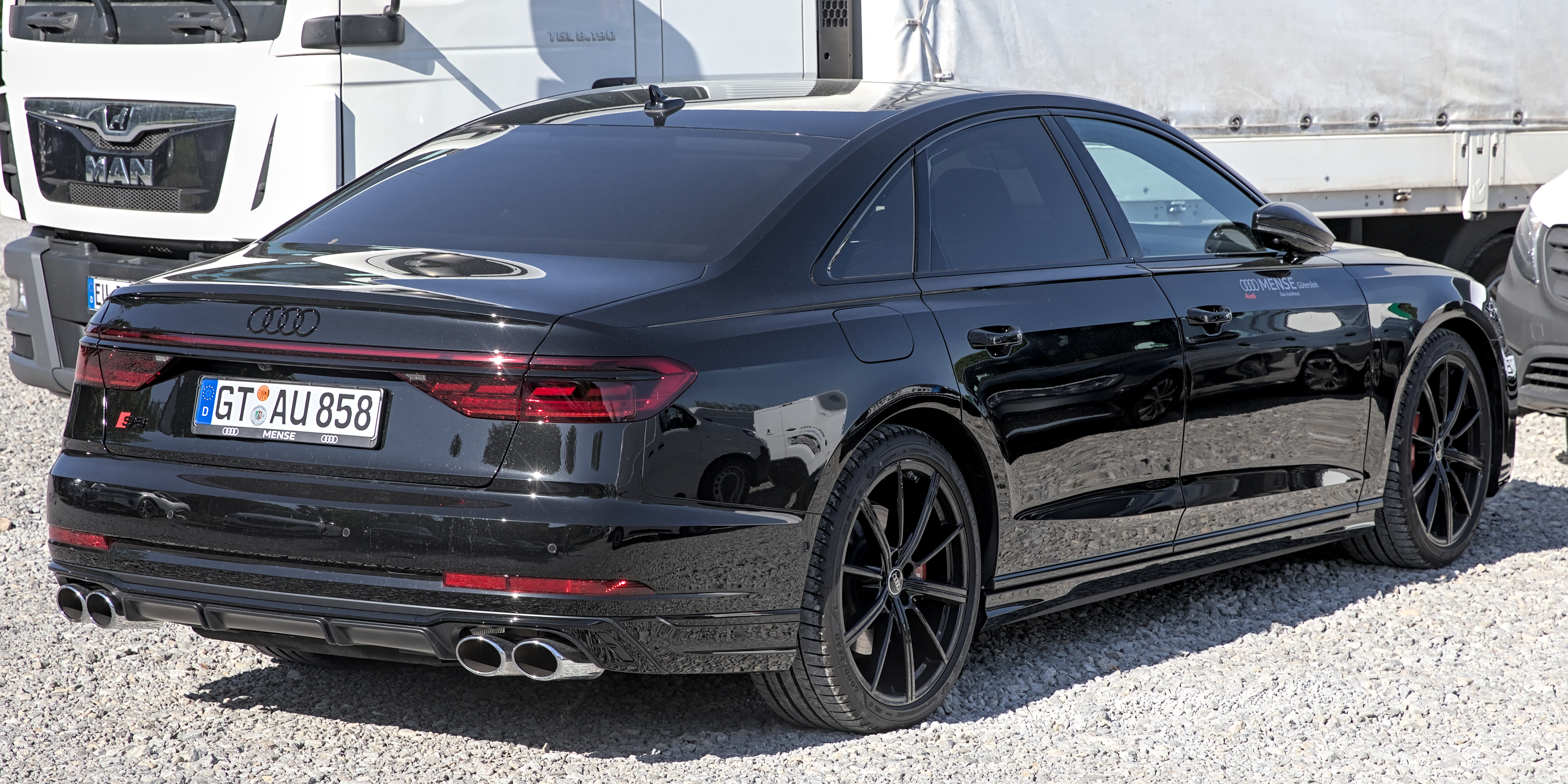

== See also ==
- Audi Sport GmbH
- Audi S and RS models
- Audi A8
- Audi S4
- Audi RS4
- Audi RS6
