= Audi 100 Coupé S =

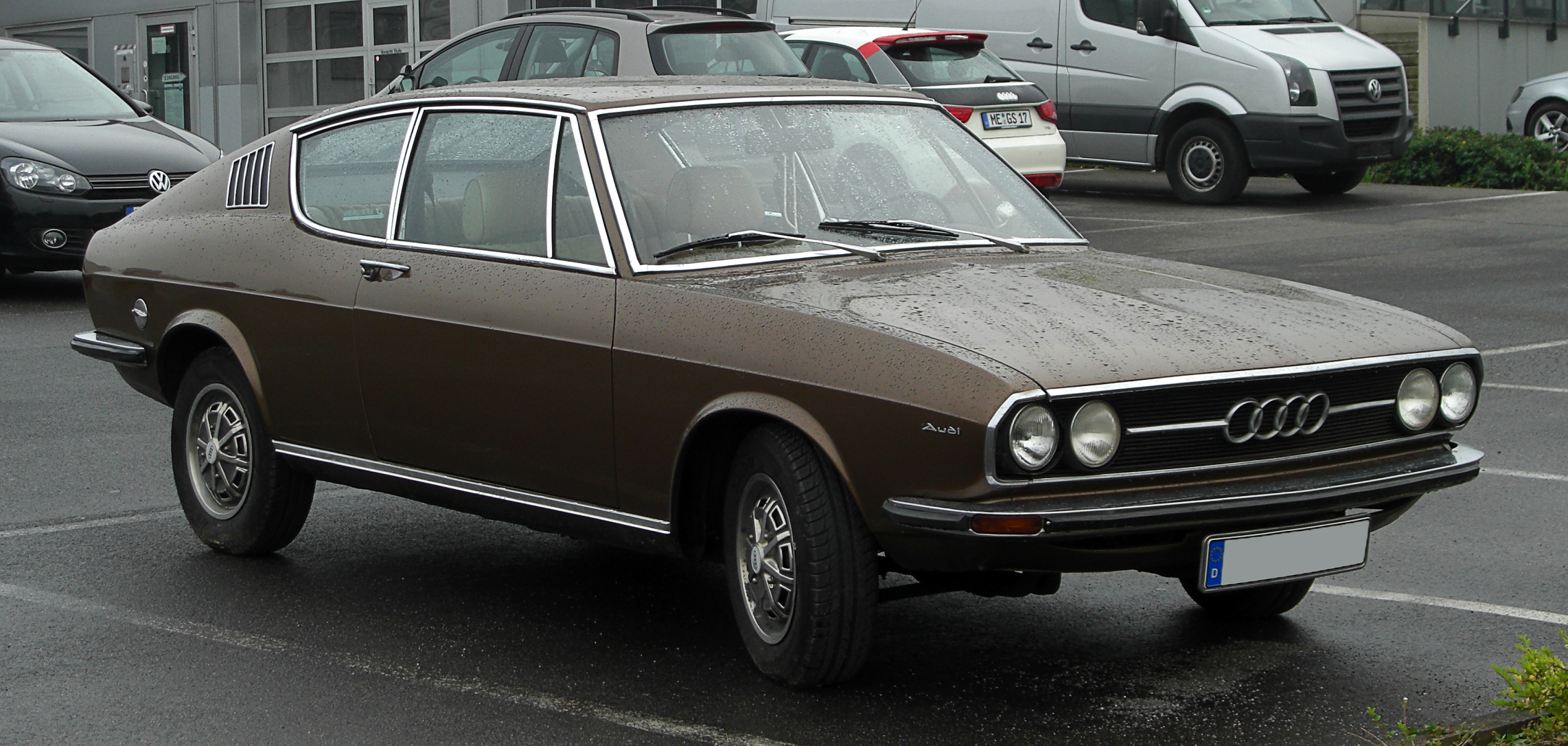

Overview
- Manufacturer: Audi AG
- Production: 1969–1976; 30,687 produced
- Assembly: Germany: Ingolstadt
- Designer: Ruprecht Neuner

Body and chassis
- Class: Mid-size coupe (D); Grand tourer
- Body style: 2-door Coupe
- Layout: Longitudinal Front-engine, Front-wheel-drive

Powertrain
- Engine: 1871 cc I4
- Transmission: 4-speed manual 3-speed automatic

Chronology
- Predecessor: Auto Union 1000 Sp
- Successor: Audi Coupe GT / Quattro; Audi A7 (spiritual)

The Audi 100 Coupé S is a grand touring car made by the German company Audi AG from 1969 until 1976. The car was first presented at the Frankfurt Motor Show in 1969. It is a two-door coupé with a fastback design and a front-engine, front-wheel-drive layout. Originally 30,687 units were produced.

== Technical specifications ==
The car came with a 4-cylinder in-line engine with a capacity of 1871 cc and was initially equipped with two carburetors with power output of 115 hp. In 1972, it changed to a single carburetor with 112 hp output.

== Gallery ==
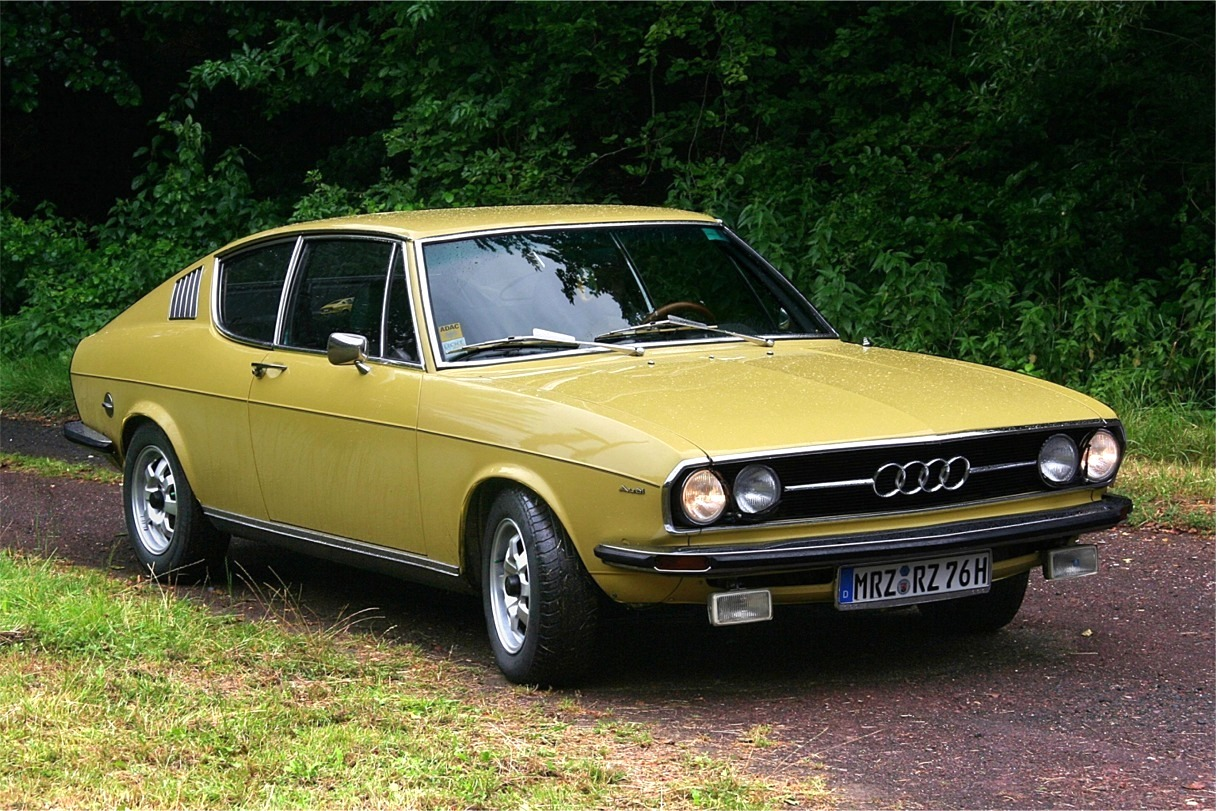

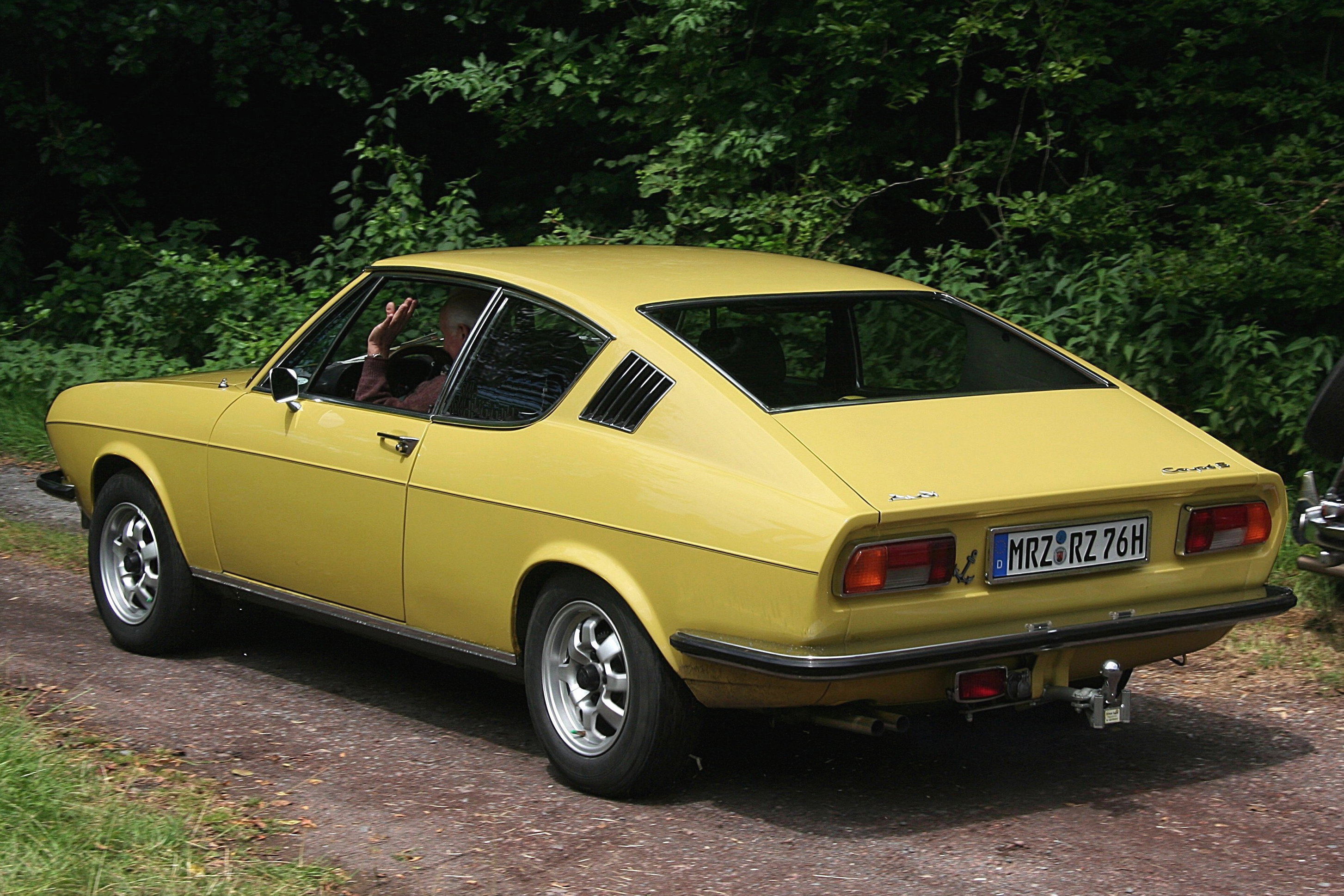

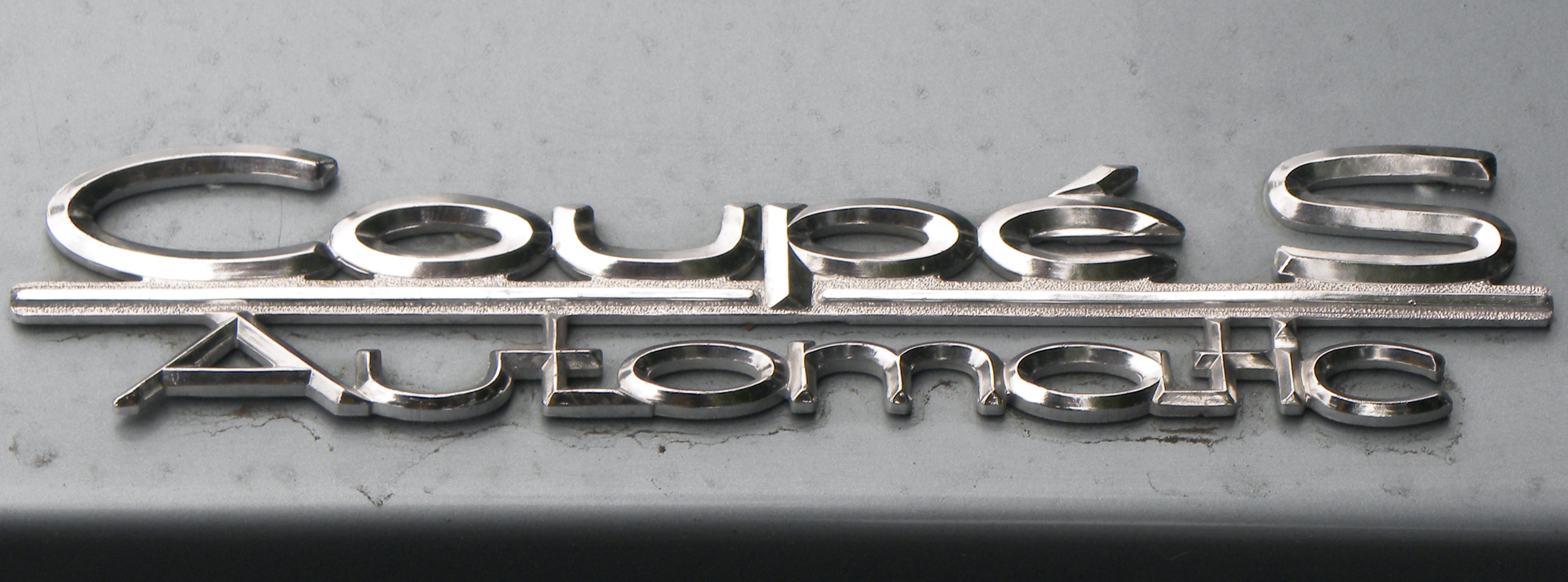

== Coupé S V3/V4 ==
In 1973, Audi, together with Porsche, developed two prototypes based on the Audi 100 Coupé S. The first was named the "V3". It was equipped with a 928 prototype V8 engine with a power of 350 hp as well as the 928's rear wheel drive running gear. It had wide flared fenders to fit the wider track. The "V4" was another 100 Coupé S with the body widened by 4.3 inches to accommodate the 928's running gear and wider track.

== See also ==
- Audi 100
- Audi S and RS models
- Ford Mustang
- Porsche 911
- Audi A5
- Audi A7
