= Niagara Falls Street Circuit =

Motorsports Park in New York

- Location: Niagara Falls, New York, USA
- Coordinates: 43°5′15.41″N 79°3′26.29″W
- Opened: 1988
- Closed: 1988
- Major events: Trans-Am Series (1988)

Street Circuit (1988)
- Length: 2.575 km (1.600 mi)
- Turns: 13
- Race lap record: 1:22.222 ( (Germany) Walter Röhrl, Audi 200 Quattro, 1988, Trans-Am)

The Niagara Falls Street Circuit was a temporary street circuit located near Niagara Falls, New York, USA, which briefly hosted Trans-Am Series for a single season in 1988.
