= 1988 Trans-Am Series =

American sports car racing competition

Seasons
- ← 1987 1989 →

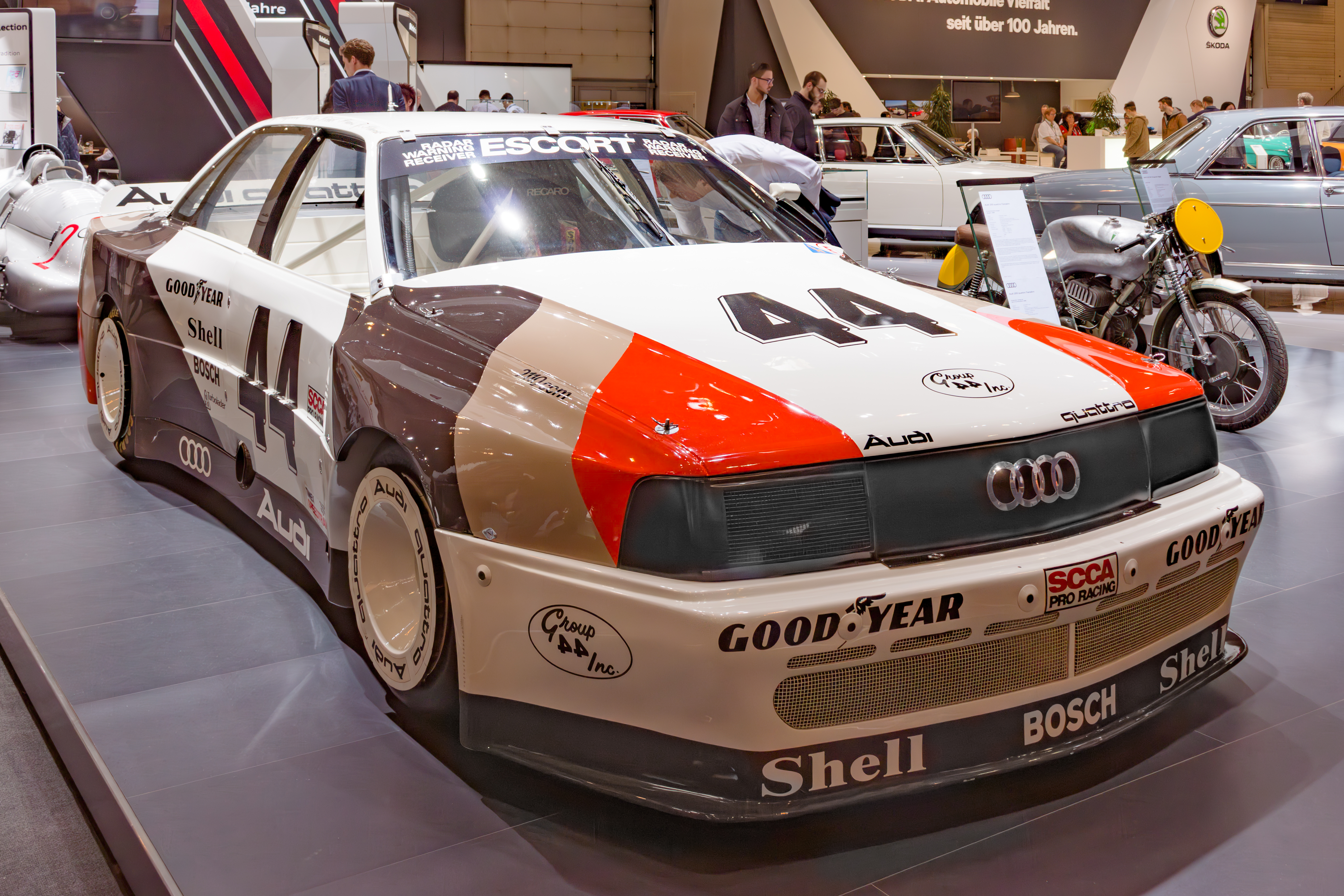
The championship winning Audi Quattro driven by Haywood

The 1988 SCCA Escort Trans-Am Championship was the 23rd running of the Sports Car Club of America's premier series. 1988 would mark the end of the "GT era", in which the series had been the support series, and often the lesser classes, of the more popular IMSA GT Championship, which had overtaken Trans Am as the most popular road racing series in the United States beginning in 1973 after the decline of muscle cars and the 1973 Oil Crisis. This led to an increase in competitiveness from foreign manufacturers.

During the first race, driver Dan Croft was critically injured and later died as the first casualty of the Long Beach Street Circuit.

The Audi 200 quattro won the manufacturer's championship and Hurley Haywood won the driver's championship.

== Results ==
Round	Date	Circuit	Winning driver	Winning vehicle
1	16 April	Long Beach	(United States) Paul Gentilozzi	Oldsmobile Cutlass
2	1 May	Dallas	(United States) Hurley Haywood	Audi 200
3	29 May	Sears Point	(United States) Willy T. Ribbs	Chevrolet Camaro
4	18 June	Detroit	(United States) Hurley Haywood	Audi 200
5	26 June	Niagara Falls	(West Germany) Walter Röhrl	Audi 200
6	2 July	Cleveland	(West Germany) Hans-Joachim Stuck	Audi 200
7	17 July	Brainerd	(West Germany) Hans-Joachim Stuck	Audi 200
8	23 July	Meadowlands	(West Germany) Hans-Joachim Stuck	Audi 200
9	6 August	Lime Rock Park	(United States) Scott Pruett	Merkur XR4Ti
10	3 September	Mid-Ohio	(West Germany) Hans-Joachim Stuck	Audi 200
11	10 September	Road America	(United States) Scott Pruett	Merkur XR4Ti
12	25 September	Mosport	(United States) Darin Brassfield	Chevrolet Corvette
13	23 October	St. Petersburg	(West Germany) Walter Röhrl	Audi 200

== Championship standings (Top 20) ==
Pos	Driver	LBH	DAL	SPT	DET	NGF	CLE	BIR	MEA	LRP	MOH	ROA	MSP	SPG	Pts
1	(United States) Hurley Haywood	2	1*	6	1	13	4	2	2	4	3	4	22	18	151.5
2	(United States) Irv Hoerr	5	2	2	18	3	2	**5***	7	3	**8**	28	5	4	141
3	(United States) Scott Pruett	**7***	27	3	2	2	**34**		**3**	**1***	16	**1***			117
4	(United States) Jim Derhaag	6	5	7	4	23	10	3	8	8	14	9	6	9	104
5	(United States) Darin Brassfield	21	3**	9	38	4	32	25	12	2	6	27	1*	2*	101
6	(West Germany) Hans-Joachim Stuck	29			35		1*	1	1*		1*	2		**28**	100
7	(United States) Lyn St. James	3	11	11	9	7	7	7	11	11	10	8	8	8	98
8	(United States) Les Lindley	4	19	4	12	5	3	21	10	6	4	30	11	7	95
9	(West Germany) Walter Röhrl		**13**	5		**1***				5			4	1	80
9	(United States) Paul Gentilozzi	1	23	8	3	17	5	4	4	32	32	36	13	26	80
11	(United States) Willy T. Ribbs		4*	**1***	11	24			5			3		3	78.5
12	(United States) Bruce Nesbitt	15	6		7	9	24	27	14	10	7	18	14	10	52
13	(United States) Deborah Gregg	12	20	13	5	11	9	29	28	9	26	14	20	6	48
14	(United States) Mike Ciasulli	27	14	36	6	18	27	6	9	36	9	6	17	DNS	46
15	(Canada) Ron Fellows											5	**3**	5	36
16	(United States) Bob Sobey	9	10	30	32	19	8	9	13	22				14	33
17	(United States) Jerry Clinton	18	17	16	30	10	12	18	20	14	29	11	10	11	28
18	(United States) Jack Baldwin										2	7			25
19	(United States) Jerry Brassfield		3**	10			29								20
19	(United States) R.K. Smith		29	20	28	DNQ	37	26	24		5	DNS	7	21	20
Pos	Driver	LBH	DAL	SPT	DET	NGF	CLE	BIR	MEA	LRP	MOH	ROA	MSP	SPG	Pts

Color	Result
Gold	Winner
Silver	2nd place
Bronze	3rd place
Green	4th & 5th place
Light Blue	6th-10th place
Dark Blue	Finished (Outside Top 10)
Purple	Did not finish
Red	Did not qualify (DNQ)
Black	Disqualified (DSQ)
White	Did not start (DNS)
Blank	Not competing

**In-line notation**
**Bold**	Pole position
*	Led most race laps
**	Darin Brassfield started in the #88 car at DAL, falling out (30th/DNF) before the green flag, switching to the #87 and finishing 3rd. Both Darin and Jerry Brassfield were credited with the finish.
