= Audi 100 =

Car model

Audi 100 / Audi 200 / Audi 5000
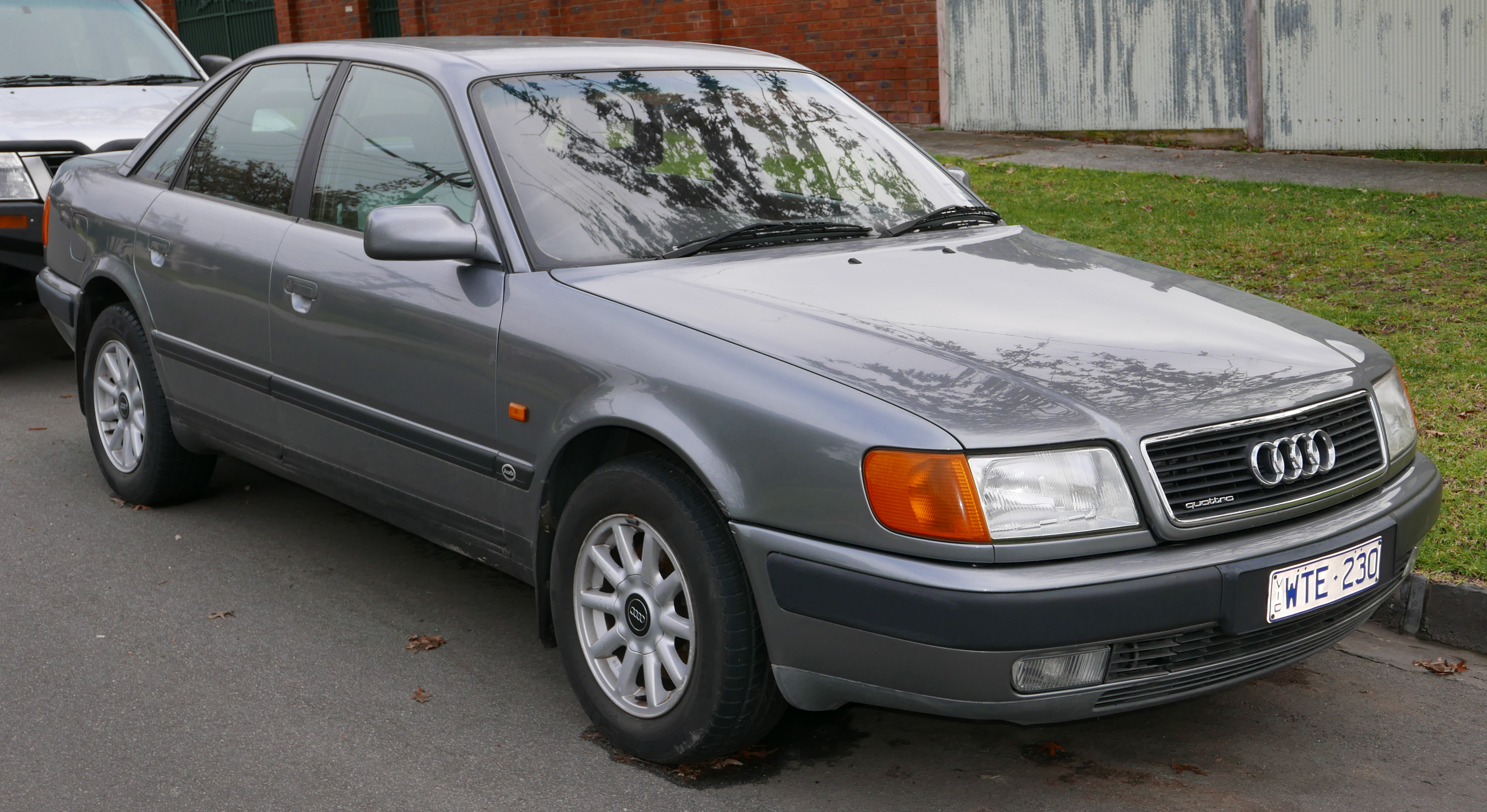

Overview
- Manufacturer: Auto Union GmbH (1968–1969); Audi NSU Auto Union AG (1969–1985); Audi AG (1985–1994)
- Also called: Audi 5000 (North America)
- Production: 1968–1994

Body and chassis
- Class: Mid-size luxury / Executive car (E)
- Layout: Longitudinal front engine, front-wheel drive or quattro four-wheel-drive
- Platform: Volkswagen Group C platform

Chronology
- Successor: Audi A6

The Audi 100 and Audi 200 (and sometimes called Audi 5000 in North America and Audi 500 in some markets like New Zealand and South Africa) are primarily mid-size/executive cars manufactured and marketed by the Audi division of the Volkswagen Group. The car was made from 1968 to 1997 across four generations (C1–C4), with a two-door model available in the first and second generation (C1-C2), and a five-door model available in the last three generations (C2–C4).They also made an 100 Avant in the 1970s.

In 1982, the third generation Audi 100 achieved a remarkably low (for its time) drag coefficient of 0.30, featuring flush greenhouse sides with unique sliding window mountings.

The C2 and C3 models of the Audi 100 were marketed in North America as the Audi 5000 from 1978 to 1988, and in South Africa as the Audi 500.

In 1993, the models were mildly restyled, and renamed the Audi A6 series in conjunction with a general new Audi naming scheme, until they were replaced by a new generation of A6, internally code-named C5, in 1997. The Audi 100's traditional competitors include the Mercedes Benz E-Class and BMW 5-Series.

== Type numbers ==
In addition to the C platform codes, Audi assigned type numbers to their models:

- F104: C1; Audi 100 (1968–1976)
- Type 43: C2; Audi 100 (1976–1982); Audi 200 (1979–1982)
- Type 44: C3; Audi 100 (1983–1991); Audi 200 (1983–1992)
- Type 4A: C4; Audi 100 (1990–1994); Audi S4 (1992–1994); Audi A6 (1994–1997); Audi S6 (1994–1997)

== Audi 100 (C1, 1968–1976) ==
Audi 100 C1 (F104)
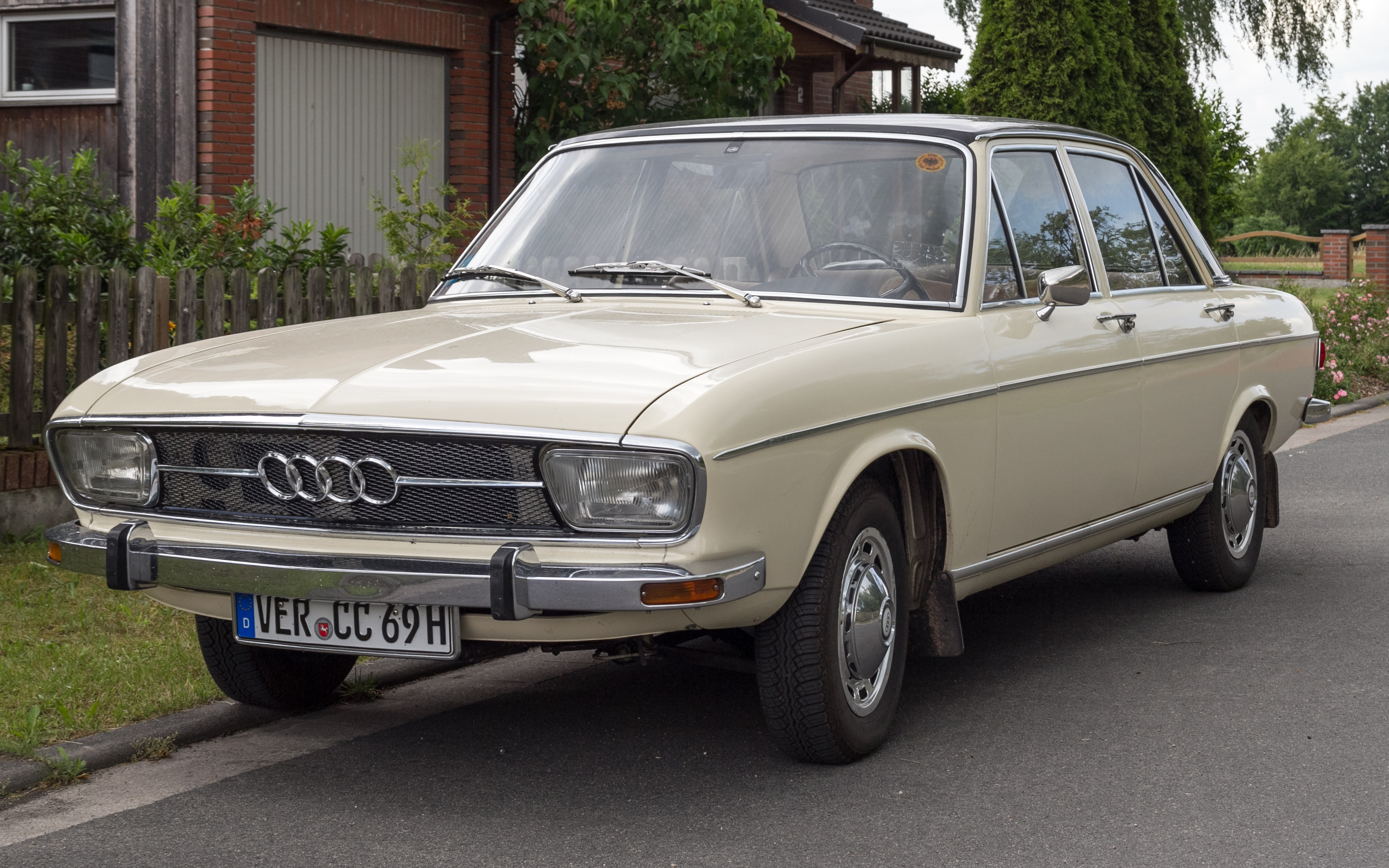
- Audi 100 (C1)

Overview
- Production: 1968–1976; 827,474 built Saloon: 796,787; Coupé S: 30,687
- Assembly: West Germany: Baden-Württemberg, Neckarsulm; West Germany: Bavaria, Ingolstadt; West Germany: Lower Saxony, Wolfsburg
- Designer: Ludwig Kraus

Body and chassis
- Body style: 2-/4-door saloon/sedan 2-door coupé
- Layout: FF layout
- Platform: Volkswagen Group C1 platform

Powertrain
- Engine: 1588 cc OHC I4; 1760 cc OHV I4; 1782 cc OHV I4 (Swiss 100 LS only); 1871 cc OHV I4
- Transmission: 4-speed manual all-synchromesh 3-speed automatic optional

Dimensions
- Wheelbase: 105.3 in (2,675 mm) (coupé)
- Length: 182.6 in (4,638 mm) (sedan); 173.2 in (4,399 mm) (coupé)
- Width: 68 in (1,727 mm)
- Height: 55.8 in (1,417 mm)
- Curb weight: 2,430–2,490 lb (1,102–1,129 kg) (sedan); 2,401 lb (1,089 kg) (coupé)

The first Audi 100, developed by Auto Union (Volkswagen's subsidiary) in Ingolstadt, was unveiled as a four-door sedan on November 26, 1968. Its name originally denoting a power output of 100 PS (74 kW), the Audi 100 was the company's largest car since the revival of the Audi brand by Volkswagen in 1965. The C1 platform spawned several variants: the Audi 100 two- and four-door saloons, and the Audi 100 Coupé S, a fastback coupé, which bore a resemblance to the Aston Martin DBS released a year earlier with similar details such as the louvres behind the rear side windows and the shape of the rear light clusters.

Audi followed the introduction of the four-door saloon in November 1968 with a two-door saloon in October 1969 and the 100 Coupé S in autumn 1970. The cars' 1.8 litre four cylinder engines originally came in base 100 (80 PS [59 kW; 79 hp]), 100 S (90 PS [66 kW; 89 hp]), and 100 LS (100 PS [74 kW; 99 hp]) versions, while the coupé was powered by a bored-out 1.9 litre developing 115 PS (85 kW; 113 hp). From April 1970 the 100 LS could be ordered with a three-speed automatic transmission sourced from Volkswagen.

Although the Audi 100's engines were considered 'rough', critics stated that buyers whose first car had been a Beetle and aspired to upgrade to a contemporary diesel-powered Mercedes-Benz were unlikely to be discouraged. The Ingolstadt production line was at full capacity, yet fell short of demand during the summer of 1970 and an additional line was set up in Volkswagen's own Wolfsburg plant, which made it the first water cooled car produced there. For the Swiss market, the 100 LS was equipped with a version of the 1.8 liter engine bored out by 0.5 mm (0.020 in), producing 107 PS (79 kW). This placed the engine above the 9 horsepower tax threshold in the 19 cantons where this system was in use; why this was desired is unknown.

Starting with the 1972 model year, the 80 and 90 PS versions were replaced by a new regular petrol variant of the 1.8 liter engine developing 85 PS (63 kW); at the same time, the 100 GL was introduced featuring the 1.9–liter engine formerly used only in the Coupé S.

In March 1971, the 500,000th Audi was produced. By now the Audi 100 had become the most commercially successful model in the company's history. In 1976 the two millionth Audi was built, of which the 100 represented 800,000 cars.

In September 1973 (for the 1974 model year) the 100 received a facelift with a somewhat smaller squared-off grille, correspondingly more angular front fenders, and changed taillight lens patterns. The rear torsion beam suspension was replaced by coil springs. For the model year 1975, the base 100 was renamed the 100 L and received a 1.6 liter four cylinder engine (coming out of the Audi 80). A four-wheel drive prototype of the Audi 100 C1 was built in 1976, long before the appearance of quattro.

In South Africa, where the 100 was also assembled, the 100 was available as the L, LS, GL, and S Coupé. Local production began towards the end of 1972; by October 1976 33,000 units had been built in South Africa. The GL received a vinyl roof and "GL" lettering on the C-pillar. The LS was dropped for 1976, but returned for 1977 along with the new GLS saloon. The Coupé was discontinued. The LS and GLS were special versions of the L and GL, with silver paintjobs, automatic transmissions, and special red interiors. L and LS have a 1,760 cc (1.8 L) engine with 75 kW (102 PS; 101 hp) DIN, while the GL and GLS have the larger 1,871 cc (1.9 L) engine producing 84 kW (114 PS; 113 hp).

In the United States the Audi 100 appeared in 1970 in LS guise, becoming the first Audi model sold there. With a 115 hp (86 kW) SAE 1.8 liter engine and with either two or four doors. For 1972 the engine was enlarged to 1.9 liters, but the SAE net claimed power was down to 91 hp (68 kW). A base and a GL model were added, as was an automatic transmission. For 1974 the lineup was again restricted to the 100 LS, while the larger safety bumpers were now fitted. Power increased to 95 hp (71 kW) for 1975, by changing to fuel injection. Standard equipment was improved accompanied by an increase in prices. In August 1977 the new Audi 5000 replaced the 100, although 537 leftover cars were sold in 1978. The coupé was not available in the United States.

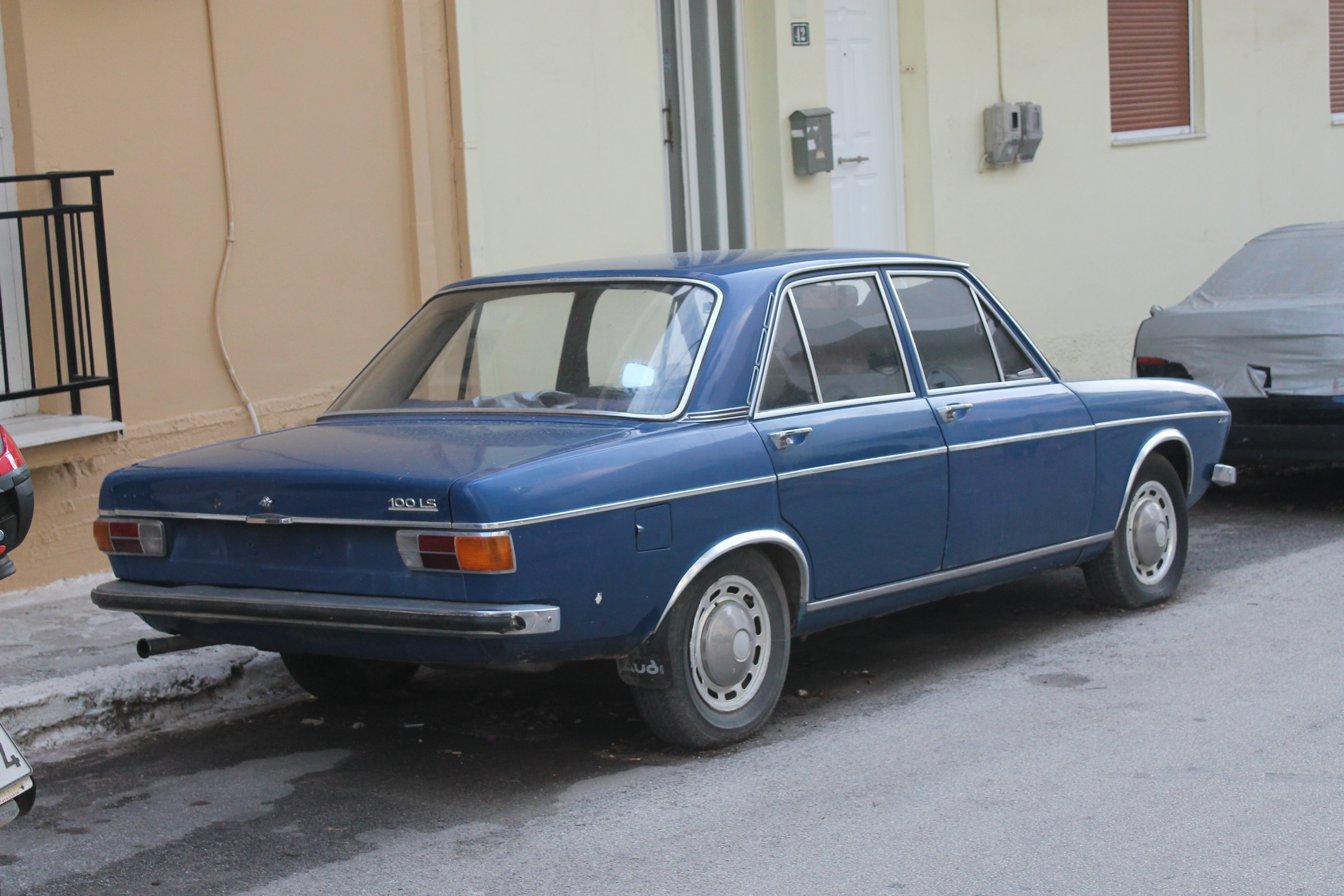
4-door LS sedan

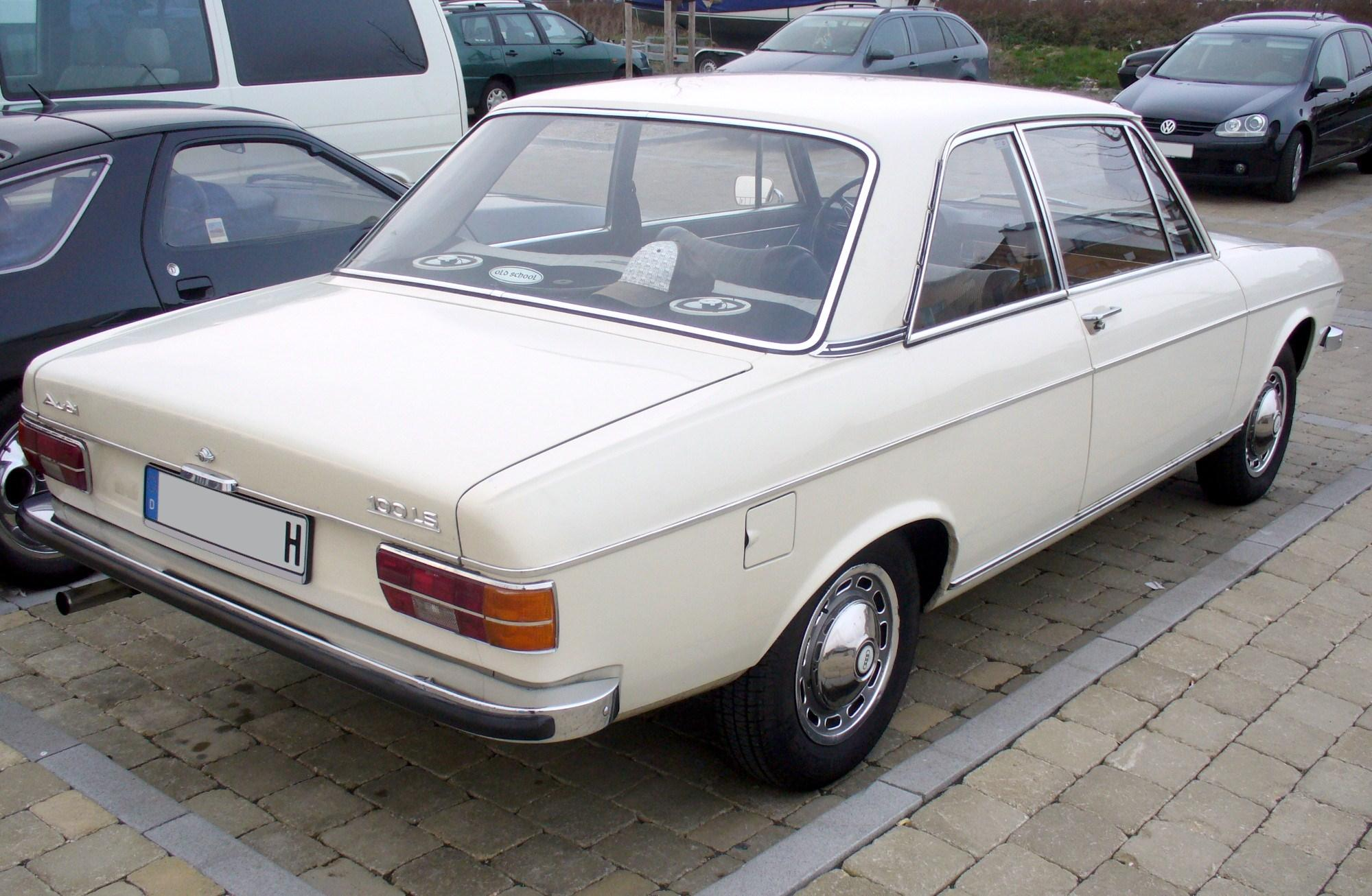
2-door LS sedan

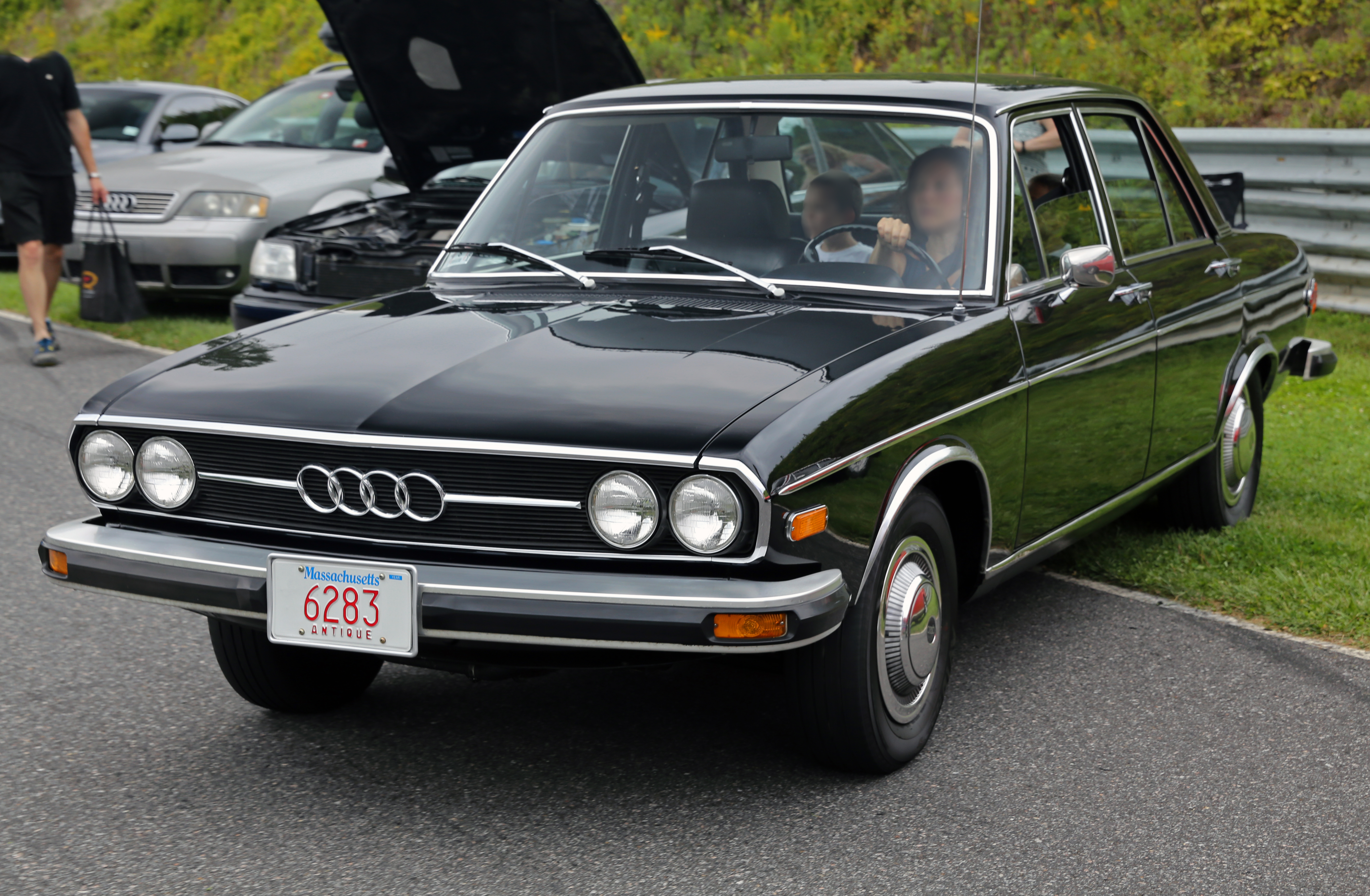
US-market Audi 100 LS

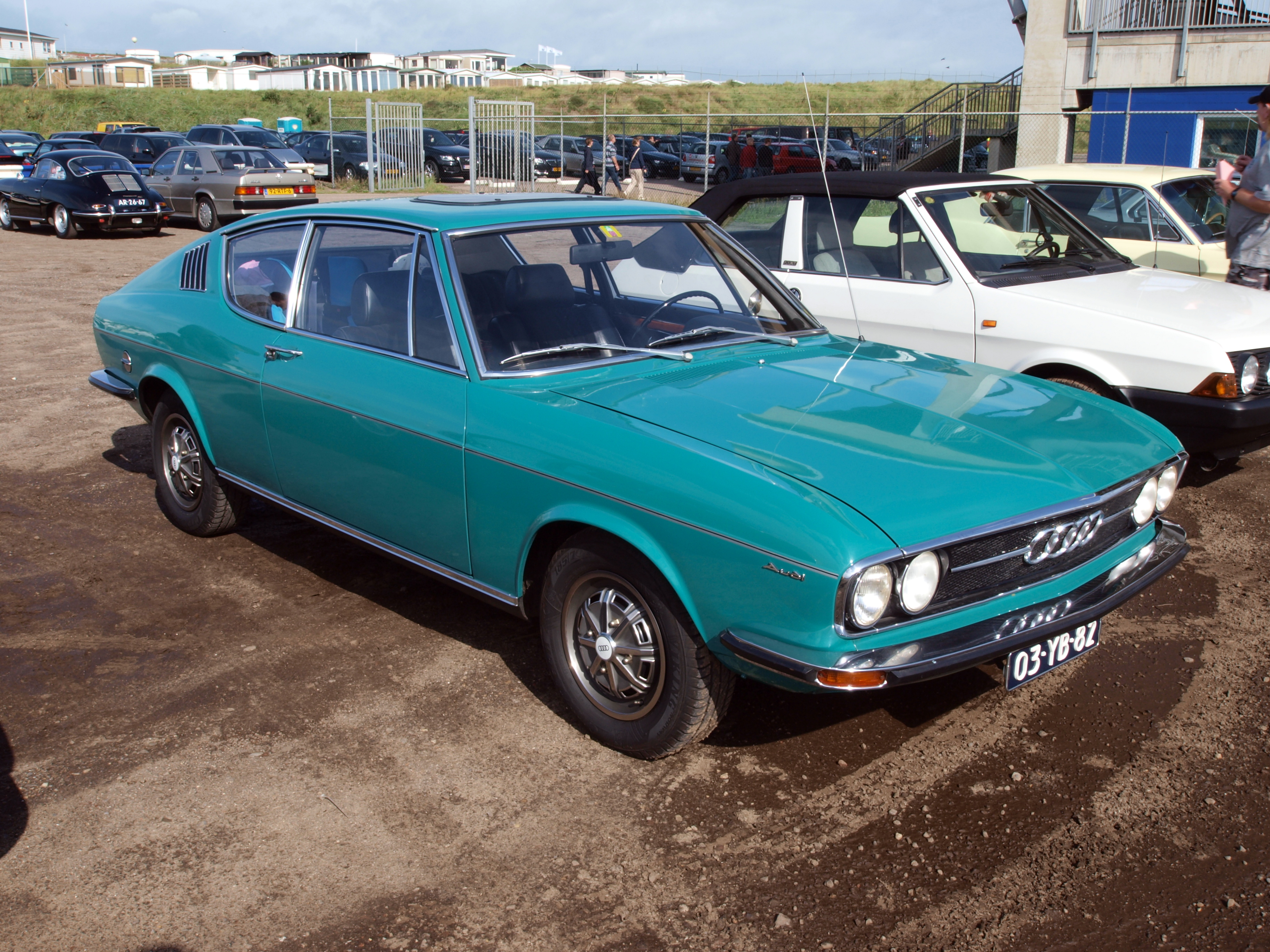
2-door Coupé S

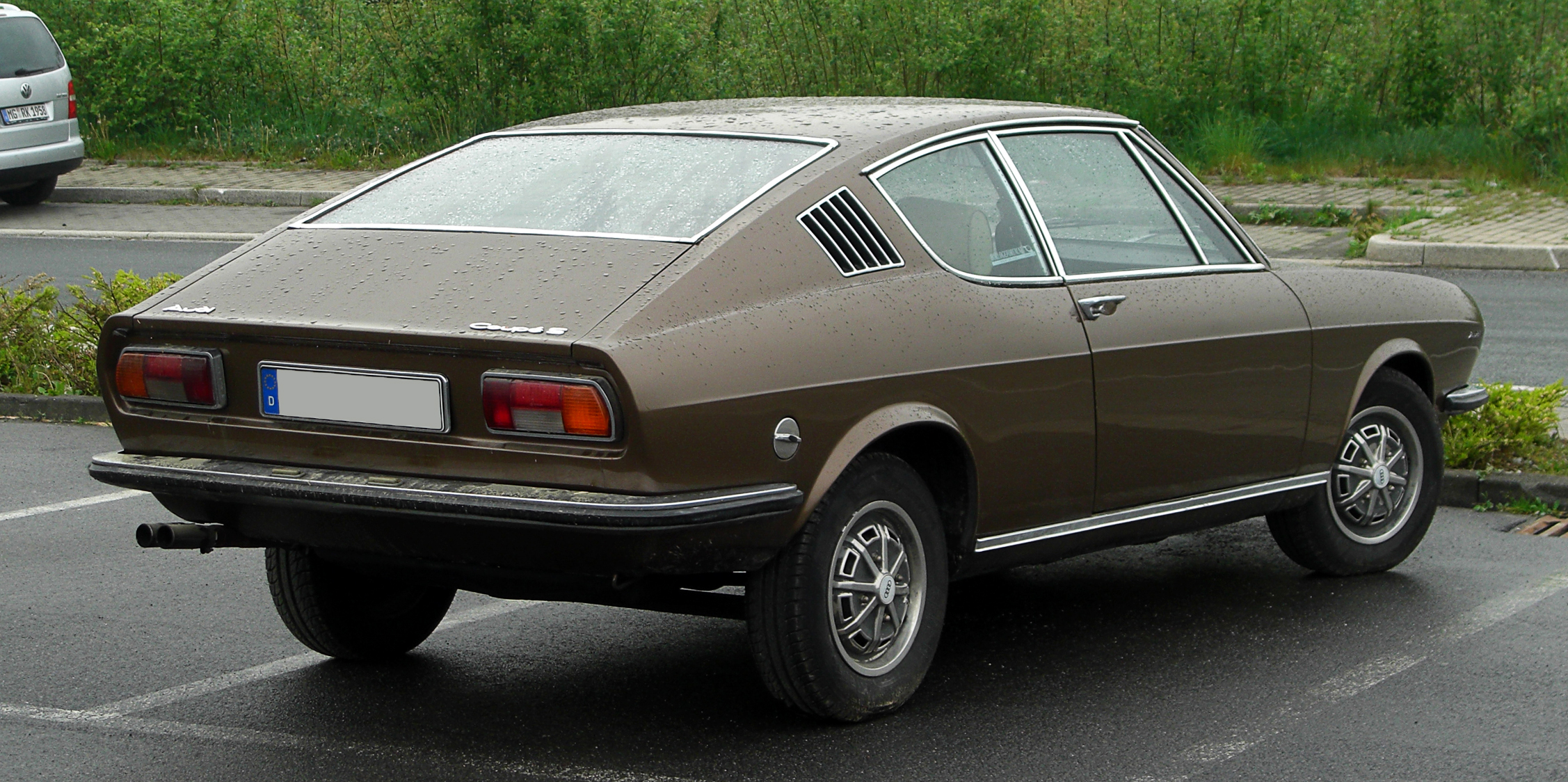
Coupé S; rear view

== Audi 100, 200 and 5000 (C2, 1976–1982) ==
Audi 100, 200 and 5000 C2 (43)
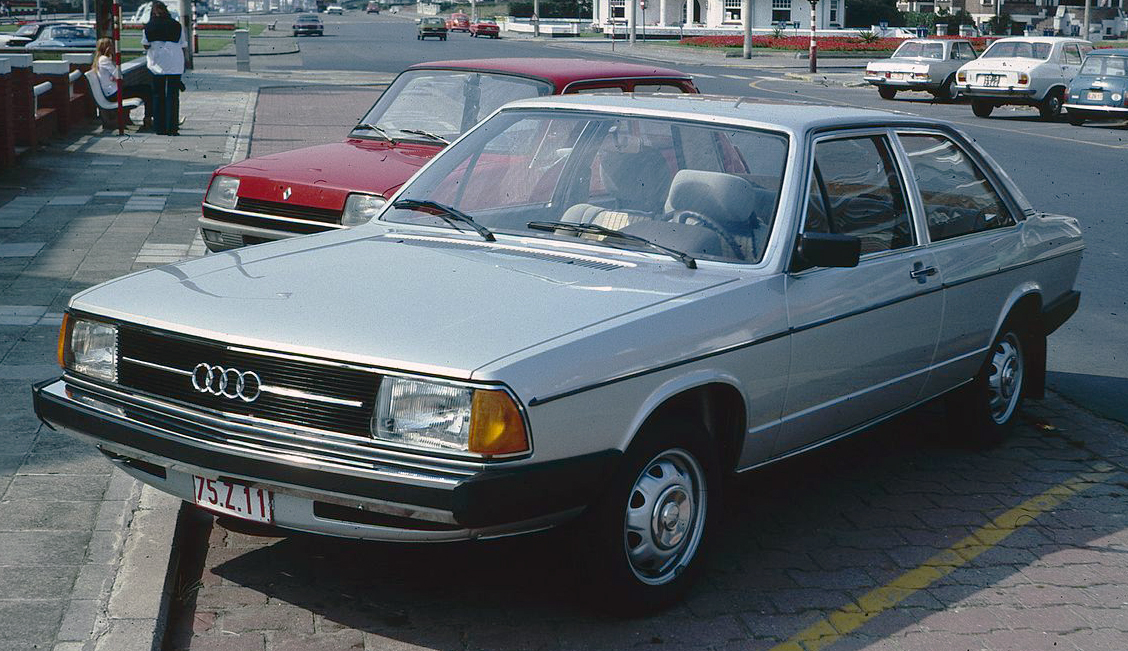
- Audi 100 2-door sedan

Overview
- Also called: Audi 5E (Australia)
- Production: 1976–1982; 988,581 built; 100 4-door: 887,647; 100 Avant: 49,652; 200: 51,282
- Assembly: West Germany: Neckarsulm, Ingolstadt; South Africa: Uitenhage; Nigeria: Lagos

Body and chassis
- Body style: 2-door saloon/sedan 4-door saloon/sedan 5-door hatchback
- Layout: Front engine, front-wheel drive
- Platform: Volkswagen Group C2 platform

Powertrain
- Engine: 1.6 L I4; 1.9 L I5; 2.0 L I4; 2.1 L I5; 2.1 L turbo I5; 2.0 L diesel I5; 2.0 L turbo diesel I5 (US only)
- Transmission: 3-speed automatic 5-speed manual

Dimensions
- Wheelbase: 105.4 in (2,677 mm)
- Length: 184.3 in (4,681 mm)
- Width: 69.6 in (1,768 mm)
- Height: 54.8 in (1,392 mm)
- Curb weight: 1,100–1,289 kg (2,425–2,842 lb)

Chronology
- Predecessor: NSU Ro 80

The restyled C2 Audi 100 was launched in 1976, with the world's first inline five-cylinder petrol engine. It was initially a 136 PS (100 kW) engine offering "six-cylinder power and four-cylinder economy", later supplemented by less powerful versions.

The Coupé was discontinued, but a five-door hatchback model, the 100 Avant, was launched in August 1977 as part of this generation. These Avant new models bore a liftback design similar to Volkswagen Passats from the era.The mainstay of the range remained the four-door sedan model. A two-door sedan version was offered, primarily on the domestic market, from February 1977, but by now there was little demand for large two-door sedans and thus only a few of these two-door Audi 100 C2s were sold. At the top of the line, the Audi 200 made its appearance at the 1979 Frankfurt Show, with fuel injected five cylinder engines in either naturally aspirated or turbocharged forms.

At the end of September 1977, the Audi 100 became the manufacturer's first model to reach a production level of 1,000,000 units. The millionth Audi 100 was a hatchback Audi 100 Avant assembled not at the company's main Ingolstadt plant but to the west, at the Neckarsulm factory which, since the demise of the mainstream volume models from the NSU range, had been concentrating on providing additional production capacity for the fast selling Audi range. The 100 C2 effectively became a de facto successor to the similarly sized NSU Ro80 which ceased production in 1977, and the NSU name gradually disappeared from the public consciousness - eventually being erased from the company name completely in 1985 when Audi NSU Auto Union AG renamed itself Audi AG.

Engines available outside of North America included:

- 1.6 L I4, 85 PS (63 kW; 84 hp), carbureted (1976−1982)
- 2.0 L I4, 115 PS (85 kW; 113 hp), carbureted (1976−1978)
- 1.9 L I5, 100 PS (74 kW; 99 hp), carbureted (1980−1982)
- 2.1 L I5, 115 PS (85 kW; 113 hp), carbureted (1978−1982)
- 2.1 L I5, 136 PS (100 kW; 134 hp), fuel injection (1976−1982) (100 and 200)
- 2.1 L I5, 170 PS (125 kW; 168 hp), fuel injection, turbo (1979−1982) (200 only)
- 2.0 L I5 Diesel, 70 PS (51 kW; 69 hp), (1978−1982)

About 850,000 Audi 100/200 C2s were built, of which 133,512 were sold in the United States.

The RHD Audi 200 5E and 5T were introduced into the UK in 1979, only 500 were imported. The 5T (170 PS) was a higher spec Turbo version of the 5E (136 PS injection) and came with many optional extras as standard. The UK version of the 5T had opening quarter lights, electric door mirrors, a sunroof, cruise control and heated seats. All Type 43 200's came with automatic gearboxes, with a five-speed manual available by special order.

The C2 was sold as the Audi 5E in Australia. It was part of a very restricted Audi lineup, being the only model on offer for several years. The only engine on offer was the carburetted 2144-cc inline-five with 85 kW (114 hp), coupled to a four-speed manual in the GL and to a three-speed automatic in the CD.

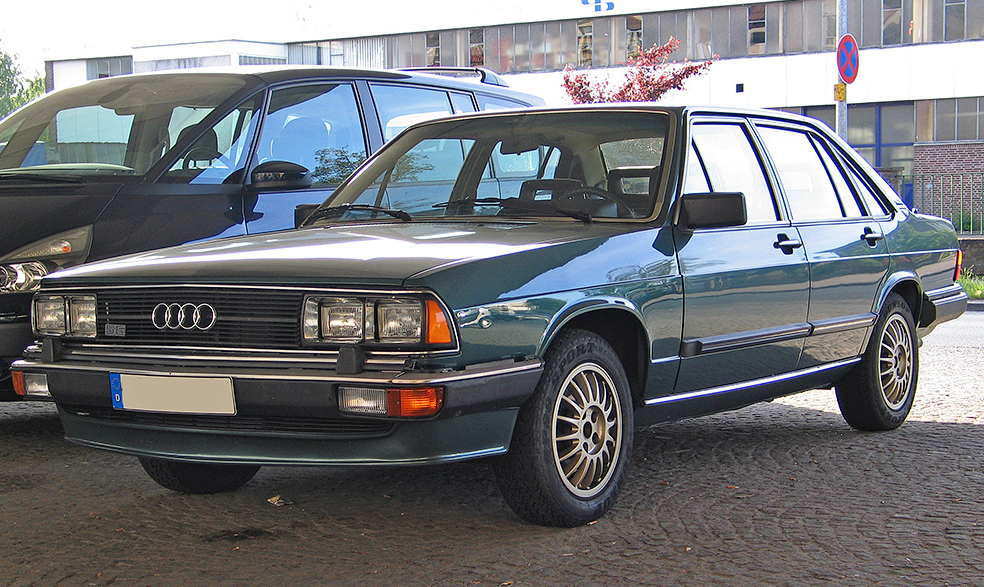
Audi 200 5E

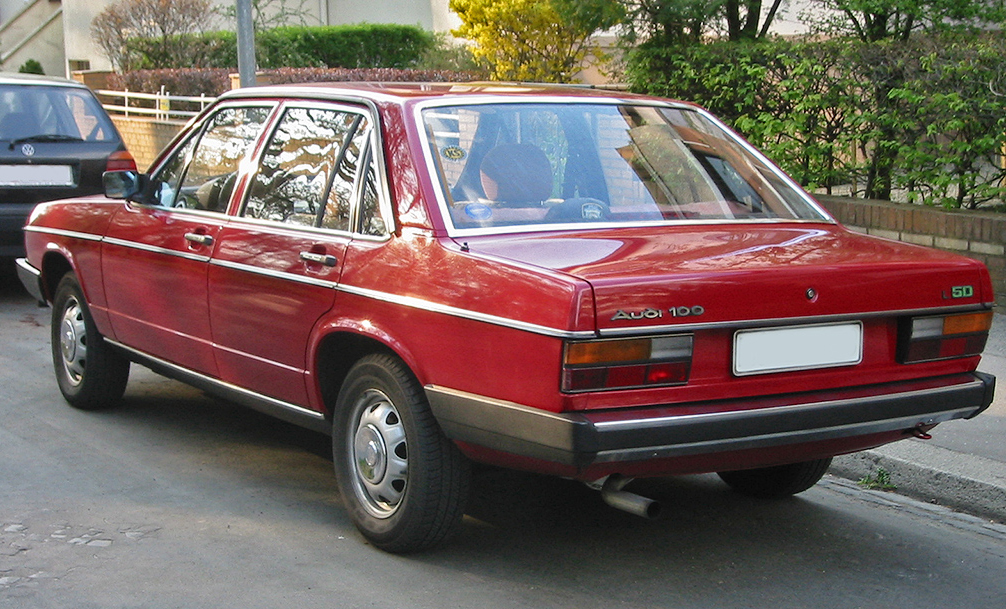
4-door sedan (rear view)

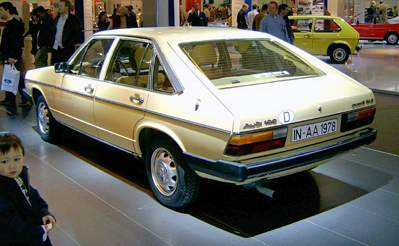
The 5-door Avant

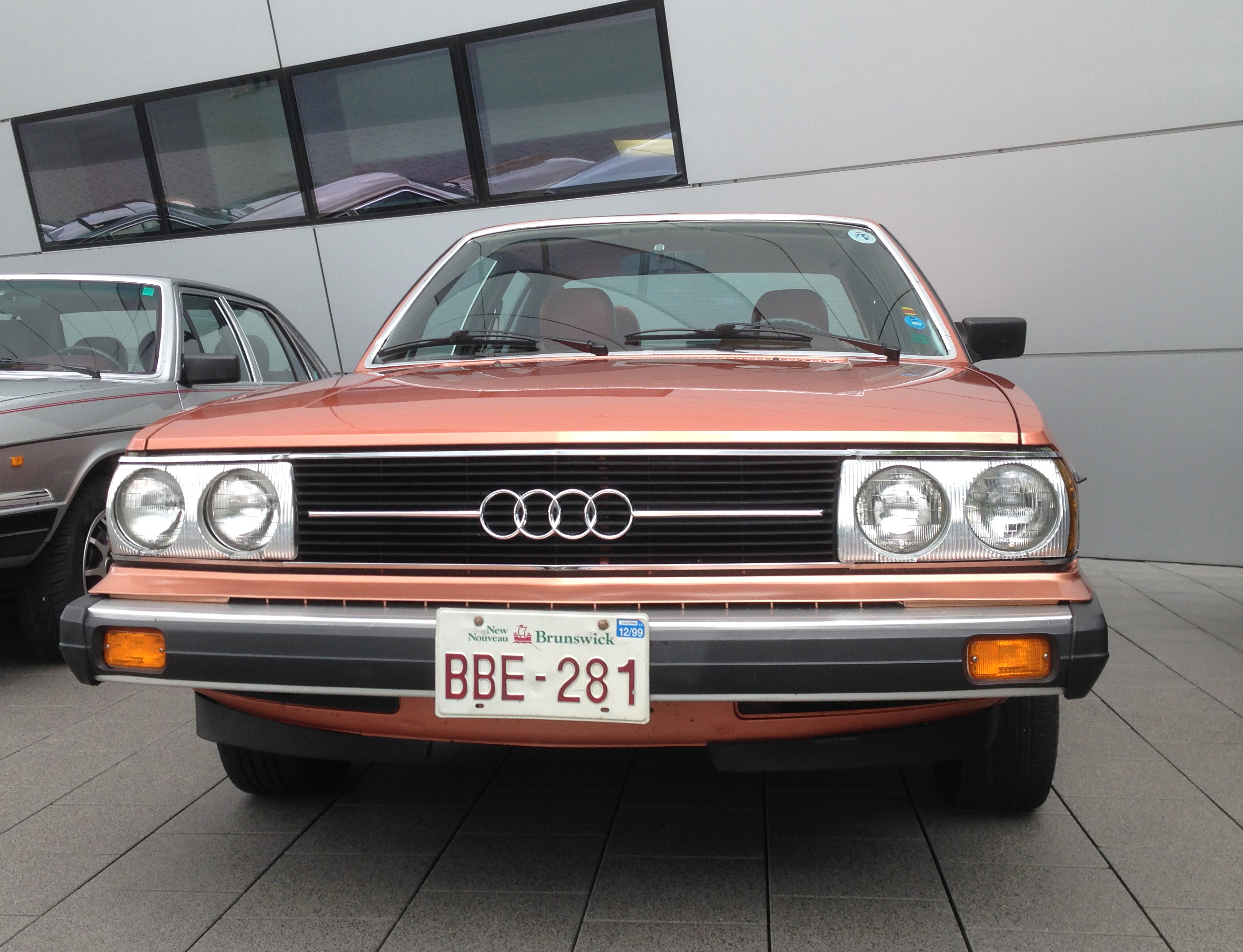
The Audi 5000 (early version with round headlights)

=== Audi 5000 (1978–1983) ===
In North America, where sales of the Audi 5000 C2s reached 133,512, only five-cylinder engines were available. The 5000 had twin round headlamps for the first two model years, after which they were replaced by rectangular units. The diesel was originally not available in California, as Porsche-Audi of North America was unable to meet that state's strict emissions standards. The engine was severely hampered by the EGR valve, catalytic converter, and other emissions control equipment; period journalists who drove the 5000 next to European-spec Audi 100s noted drivability issues and lack of power. The naturally aspirated diesel was also only available with a five-speed manual, a handicap in the American market. It was not until the 1983 introduction of the turbo diesel that these concerns were met. The 50-state Turbo diesel arrived for the 1983 model year, at about the same time that the Audi 100 C3 was presented in Europe, and was only ever sold in the United States.

In 1980 the 5000 Turbo arrived in the US. This model only delivered 130 hp (97 kW), more than twenty percent less than the European spec model. Aside from meeting the strict US emissions, this model also had lower boost pressure to be able to run on the lower octane unleaded fuel available in America. While the Turbo also received a harder, sportier suspension, bigger aluminium wheels, and other performance upgrades, it was also only available with a three-speed automatic transmission. Road & Track were able to reach a top speed of 113 mph (182 km/h) in the federalized car, slower than a naturally aspirated European market 2.1 E. In the US, reflecting the Audi's luxury connotations, 90 percent of 5000s were delivered with the costlier "S" equipment package.

The 5000 Turbo diesel received an increase in power and torque, somewhat reduced by only being available in conjunction with Audi's "3+E" automatic transmission. This was a three-speed automatic in which the "E" mode engaged a freewheel effect, lowering fuel consumption by 3-5 percent. The Turbo diesel received the same body and interior specifications as the gasoline-powered turbo; the only difference was the use of 14-inch alloy wheels rather than the wider 15-inch items mounted on the 5000 Turbo.

North America:

- 2.1 L I5, 103 hp (77 kW; 104 PS), fuel injection (MY 1978−1983). 100 hp (75 kW) from 1980 on.
- 2.1 L I5, 130 hp (97 kW; 132 PS), fuel injection, turbo (MY 1980−1983)
- 2.0 L I5 diesel, 67 hp (50 kW; 68 PS) (MY 1980−1982)
- 2.0 L I5 turbo diesel, 84 hp (63 kW; 85 PS) (MY 1983)

== Audi 100, 200 and 5000 (C3, 1982–1991) ==
Audi 100, 200 and 5000 C3 (44)
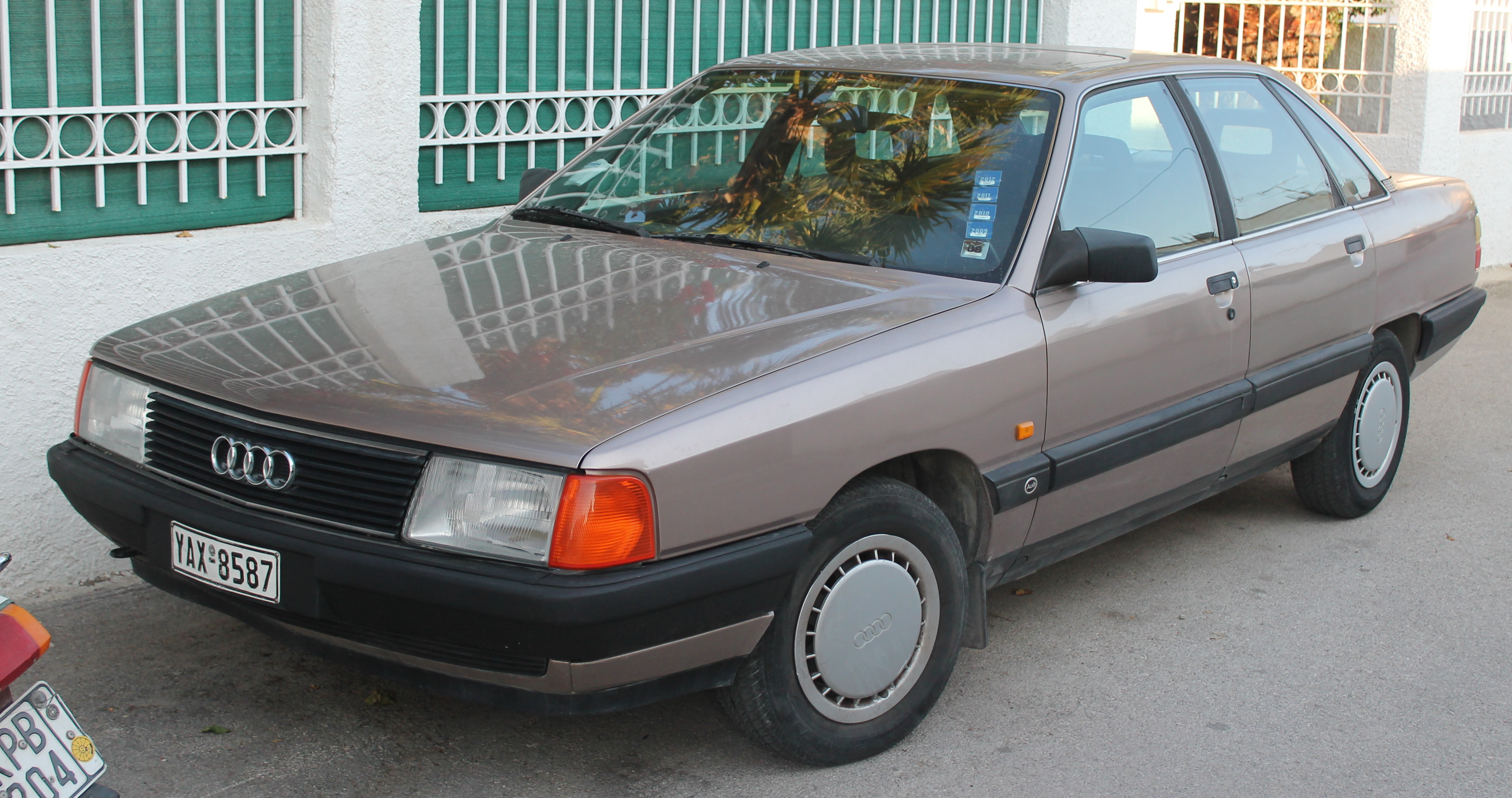
- 1988–1991 Audi 100 sedan

Overview
- Production: 1982–1991 (Germany)
- Model years: 1983–1992
- Assembly: Germany: Neckarsulm; China: Changchun (FAW-VW, Hongqi); South Africa: Uitenhage
- Designer: Hartmut Warkuss

Body and chassis
- Body style: 4-door saloon/sedan 5-door estate/wagon
- Layout: Front engine, front-wheel drive / quattro permanent four-wheel drive
- Platform: Volkswagen Group C3 platform
- Related: Audi V8

Powertrain
- Engine: Petrol: 1.8 L I4; 1.9 L I5; 2.0 L I5; 2.1 L I5; 2.1 L turbo I5; 2.2 L I5; 2.2 L turbo I5; 2.3 L I5; Diesel: 2.0 L I5; 2.0 L turbo I5; 2.4 L I5; 2.5 L TDI I5
- Transmission: 4/5-speed manual 3/4-speed automatic

Dimensions
- Wheelbase: 105.6 in (2,682 mm) (1988–1991 FWD & 200); 105.9 in (2,690 mm) (1988–1990 AWD & Wagons); 105.8 in (2,687 mm) (Pre-1988)
- Length: 188.7 in (4,793 mm) (global); 192.7 in (4,895 mm) (USA)
- Width: 71.4 in (1,814 mm)
- Height: 55.9 in (1,420 mm); 55.7 in (1,415 mm) (S)
- Curb weight: 1,320–1,590 kg (2,910–3,505 lb)

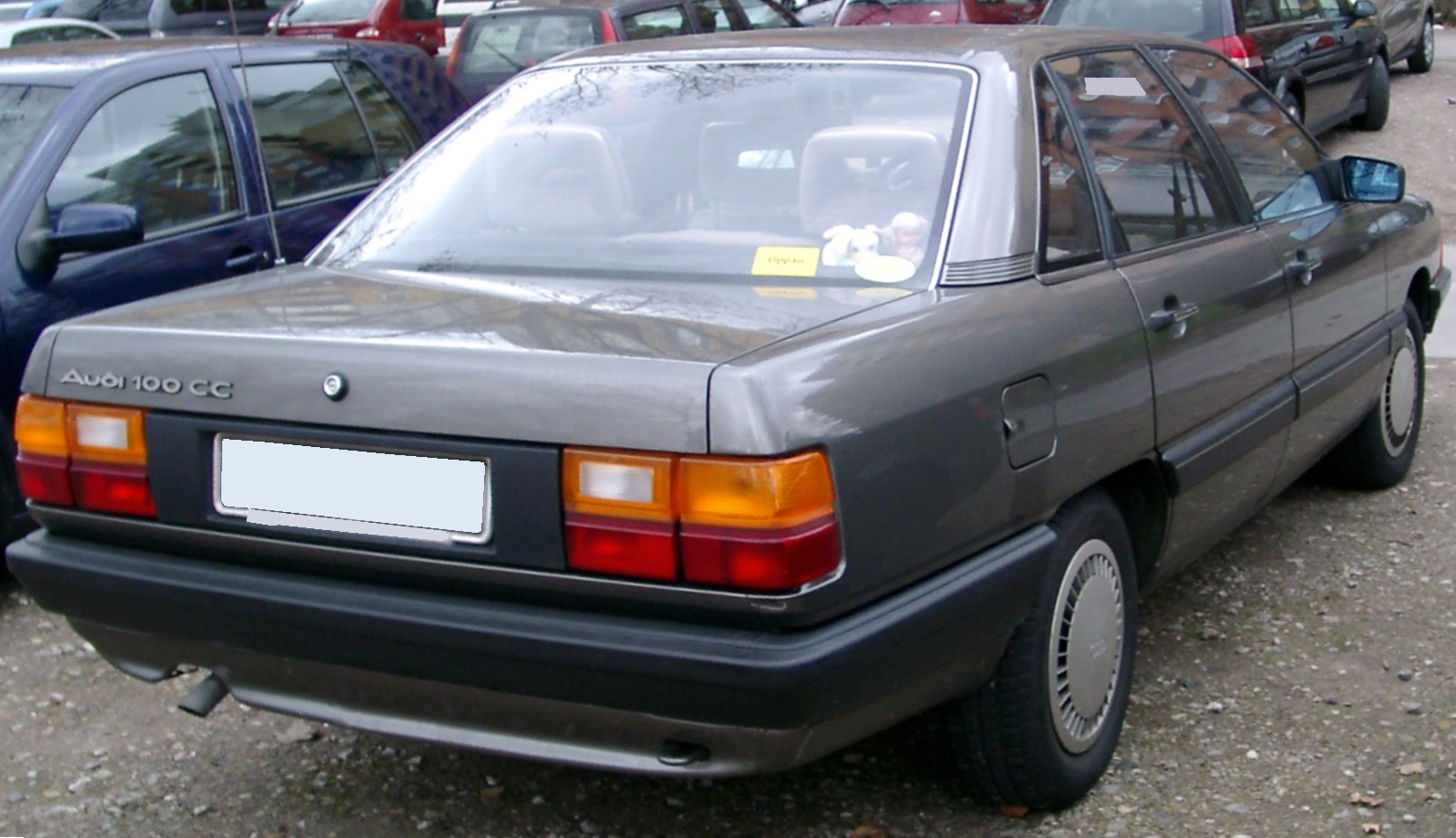
Sedan (pre-facelift)

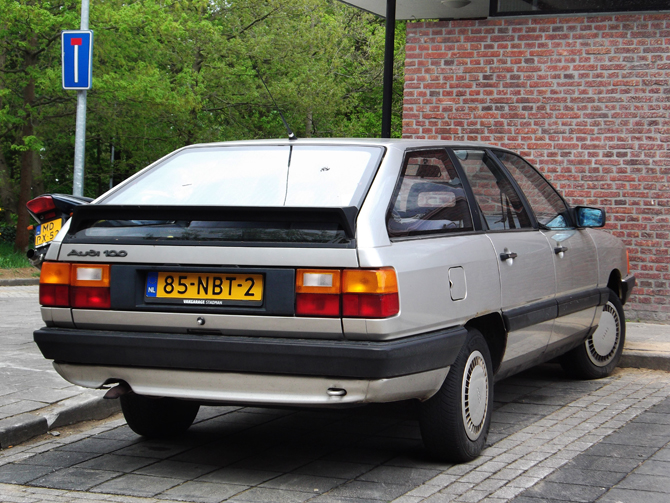
Avant (pre-facelift)

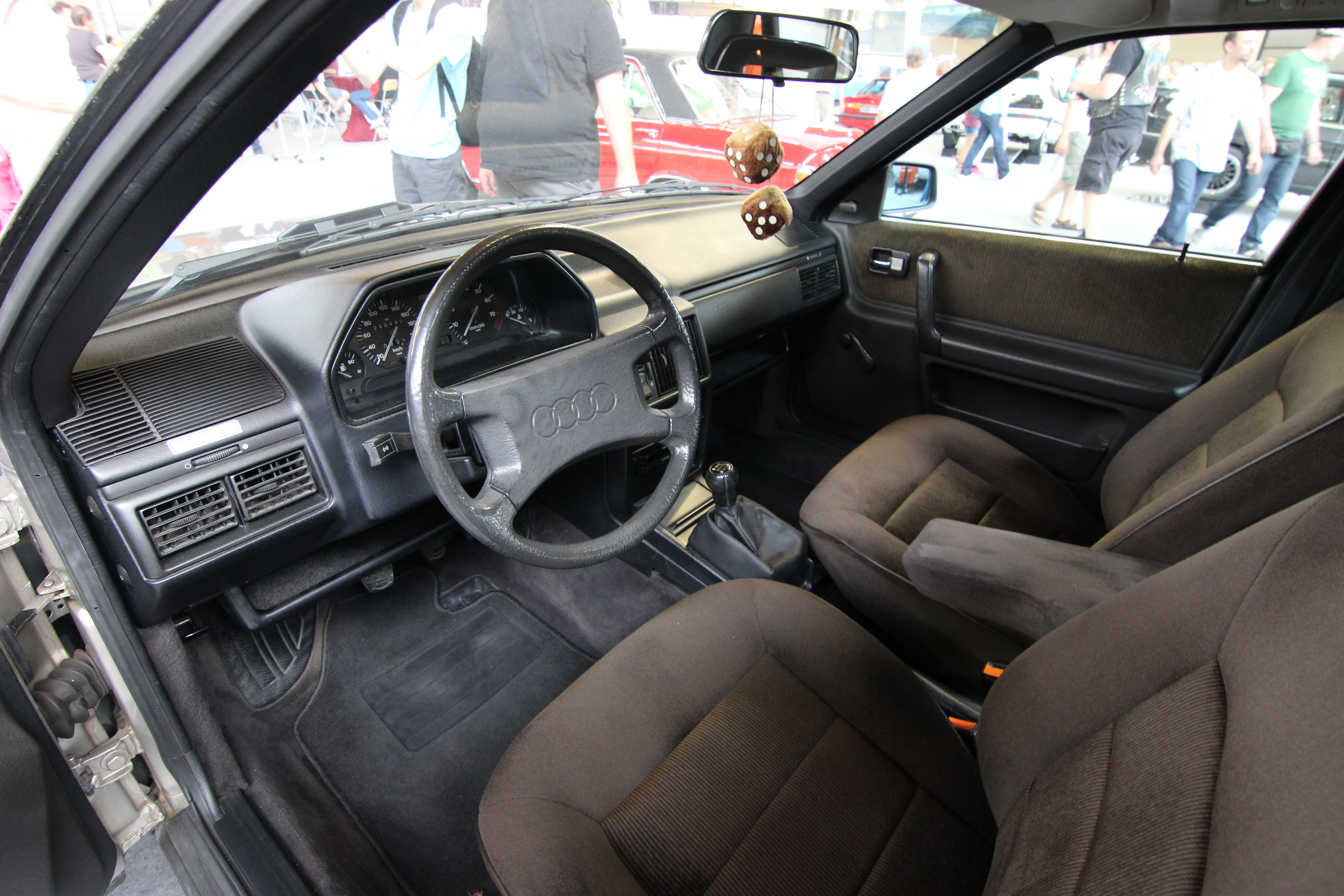
Interior

The third generation Audi 100 launched in September 1982 with aerodynamic styling, contrasting the boxy styling of its predecessor, and offering a much improved drag coefficient, 0.30 on base model. The aerodynamic C3 bodywork featured pin-mounted flush windows, offering a key reduction in aerodynamic drag. Altogether, the aerodynamic body increased the fuel efficiency and top speed versus other cars of similar engine size. The C3 introduced Audi's proprietary restraint system, marketed as procon-ten.

Two-door models were no longer offered, and the Audi 100 Avant was now positioned as a station wagon rather than a hatchback - the Avant designation would be used for all Audi station wagons from that point forward. The Avant featured an available extra folding third row seat — not available in conjunction with ABS-brakes as the brake control unit sat in the same space. The 200, launched in 1983 continued as the upmarket variant with several versions of the 2.2 L turbo 5-cylinder available in different markets over its life ranging in power outputs from 165 PS (121 kW) MC engine, through the 200 PS (147 kW) versions to the final 220 PS (162 kW) 20-valve 3B engine available from 1991. The 1983 Audi 200 Turbo had a top speed of 139 mph (224 km/h). The MC turbo engine was available in the 100 as well for some markets.

In January 1988 the Audi 100 received a minor facelift, including flush fitting door handles. The 1991 200 20V featured flared (vs. flat) front and rounded rear wheel arches to accommodate wider wheel and tire combinations to be fitted to 20V models. U.S. magazine articles of the period reported 0-60 times of the 20-valve Audi 200 under 7 seconds, with 1/4 mile times in the mid to upper 15 second mark.

The Audi 100 also featured the first model to wear the TDI label, a 2.5 L straight-five direct injection turbo-diesel (TDI) model with 120 PS (88 kW) introduced in January 1990 (engine code 1T). It had a very brief career in the C3, being replaced in December of that year with the arrival of the C4.

The Audi V8 used an enlarged version of the bodyshell from the Audi 100/200 C3 but received more luxury features and a V8 engine.

=== Reported sudden unintended acceleration ===
During the 1983 to 1987 model years, Audi's U.S. sales fell after several recalls of Audi 5000 models, which were associated with reported incidents of sudden unintended acceleration linked to six deaths and 700 accidents. At the time, the National Highway Traffic Safety Administration (NHTSA) was investigating 50 car models from 20 manufacturers for sudden surges of power.

In North America, the CBS television broadcast network 60 Minutes news program aired a report titled Out of Control on November 23, 1986. It featured interviews with six people who had sued Audi after reporting unintended acceleration, including footage of an Audi 5000 ostensibly displaying a surge of acceleration while the brake pedal was depressed. Subsequent investigation revealed that 60 Minutes had not disclosed they had engineered the vehicle's behavior – fitting a canister of compressed air on the passenger-side floor, to pump fluid via a hose to a hole drilled into the transmission – the arrangement executed by one of the experts who had testified on behalf of a plaintiff in a then-pending lawsuit against Audi's parent company.

Audi initially responded by suggesting that the drivers of the cars involved in the incidents were at fault, because they had depressed the accelerator pedal rather than the brake. Subsequently, the National Highway Traffic Safety Administration (NHTSA) concluded that the majority of unintended acceleration cases, including all the ones that prompted the 60 Minutes report, were caused mainly by factors such as confusion of pedals. CBS acknowledged the report and stressed its findings that "the problem could be aggravated by vehicle design, the shape, location and feel of gas and brake pedals." Audi's research demonstrated that many of the drivers who encountered "unintended acceleration" were "below average in height", indicating their knowledge of a relationship between design and the incidents.

In a review study published in 2012, NHTSA summarized its past findings about the Audi unintended acceleration problems: "Once an unintended acceleration had begun, in the Audi 5000, due to a failure in the idle-stabilizer system (producing an initial acceleration of 0.3g), pedal misapplication resulting from panic, confusion, or unfamiliarity with the Audi 5000 contributed to the severity of the incident."

This summary is consistent with the conclusions of NHTSA's most technical analysis at the time: "Audi idle-stabilization systems were prone to defects which resulted in excessive idle speeds and brief unanticipated accelerations of up to 0.3g [which is similar in magnitude to an emergency stop in a subway car]. These accelerations could not be the sole cause of [(long-duration) sudden acceleration incidents (SAI)], but might have triggered some SAIs by startling the driver. The defective idle-stabilization system performed a type of electronic throttle control. Significantly: multiple "intermittent malfunctions of the electronic control unit were observed and recorded ... and [were also observed and] reported by Transport Canada."

With the series of recall campaigns, Audi made several modifications; the first adjusted the distance between the brake and accelerator pedal on automatic-transmission models. Later repairs of 250,000 cars dating back to 1978 added a device requiring the driver to press the brake pedal before shifting out of park. It is unclear what was done regarding the defects in the idle-stabilization system. Subsequent to the recall campaigns, vehicles now include gear shift patterns and brake interlock mechanisms to prevent deliberate gear selection.

Audi's U.S. sales, which had reached 74,061 in 1985, dropped to 12,283 in 1991 and remained level for three years, with resale values falling dramatically. Audi subsequently offered increased warranty protection and renamed the affected models – with the 5000 becoming the 100 and 200 in 1989. The company only reached the same level of U.S. sales again by model year 2000.

As of early 2010, a class-action lawsuit – dealing with a charge that on account of the sudden acceleration controversy, Audi models had lost resale value – filed in 1987 by about 7,500 Audi 5000-model owners remains unsettled and is currently contested in county court in Chicago after appeals at the Illinois state and U.S. federal levels. The NHTSA's findings have been "small solace for Audi in defense of product liability actions, as more and more successful cases used Audi's human factor design errors and failure to warn or recall as a basis for liability."

=== Engines ===
The engine range comprised the following engines: More details under the discontinued VAG engines.

Audi 100:

- 1.8 L I-4, 75 PS (55 kW; 74 hp), carbureted (1982−1987)
- 1.8 L I-4, 90 PS (66 kW; 89 hp), carbureted, later fuel injected/with catalyst (1983−1990)
- 1.9 L I-5, 100 PS (74 kW; 99 hp), carbureted (1982−1984)
- 2.0 L I-5, 115 PS (85 kW; 113 hp), fuel injection, later catalyst (1984−1990)
- 2.1 L I-5, 136 PS (100 kW; 134 hp), fuel injection (1982−1984)
- 2.2 L I-5, 138 PS (101 kW; 136 hp), fuel injection (1984−1990)
- 2.2 L I-5, 115 PS (85 kW; 113 hp), fuel injection, catalyst (1984−1987)
- 2.3 L I-5, 136 PS (100 kW; 134 hp), fuel injection, catalyst (1986−1990)
- 2.2 L I-5, 165 PS (121 kW; 163 hp), fuel injection, turbo, catalyst (1986−1990)
- 2.0 L I-5 Diesel, 70 PS (51 kW; 69 hp) (1982−1989)
- 2.0 L I-5 Turbodiesel, 87 PS (64 kW; 86 hp) (1983−1988)
- 2.0 L I-5 Turbodiesel, 100 PS (74 kW; 99 hp) (1988−1989)
- 2.4 L I-5 Diesel, 82 PS (60 kW; 81 hp) (1989−1990)
- 2.5 L I-5 TDI, 120 PS (88 kW; 118 hp) (1990)

Audi 200:

- 2.1 L I-5, 136 PS (100 kW; 134 hp), fuel injection (1983−1984)
- 2.2 L I-5, 138 PS (101 kW; 136 hp), fuel injection (1984−1985)
- 2.2 L I-5, 165 PS (121 kW; 163 hp), fuel injection, turbo, catalyst (1985−1991)
- 2.1 L I-5, 182 PS (134 kW; 180 hp), fuel injection, turbo (1983−1987)
- 2.2 L I-5, 200 PS (147 kW; 197 hp), fuel injection, turbo (1988−1990); 190 PS (140 kW; 187 hp) with automatic transmission
- 2.2 L I-5, 220 PS (162 kW; 217 hp), 20-valve turbo for 200 Quattro 20V (1989−1991)

Audi 5000/100/200 North America (all fuel injected and catalysed):

- 2.1 L I-5, 100 hp (75 kW; 101 PS) (MY 1984)
- 2.2 L I-5, 115 hp (86 kW; 117 PS) (MY 1985)
- 2.2 L I-5, 110 hp (82 kW; 112 PS) (MY 1986−1987 1/2)
- 2.3 L I-5, 130 hp (97 kW; 132 PS) (MY 1987 1/2−1991)
- 2.1 L I-5 Turbo, 140 hp (104 kW; 142 PS) (MY 1984−1985)
- 2.2 L I-5 Turbo, 158 hp (118 kW; 160 PS) (MY 1986−1987 1/2)
- 2.2 L I-5 Turbo, 162 hp (121 kW; 164 PS) (MY 1987 1/2−1991)
- 2.2 L I-5 20-valve Turbo, 217 hp (162 kW; 220 PS) (MY 1991)

The 5000 S/Turbo was on Car and Driver's Ten Best list for 1984 and 1985. The CS Turbo quattro was on that list for 1986 through 1988.

Production figures^{a}
| Model | Volume |
|---|---|
| 100 | 852,243 |
| 100 Avant | 122,852 |
| 200 | 97,195 |
| 200 Avant | 6,153 |
| Total | 1,078,443 |

Note ^{a}: figures given for calendar years, might include late C2 production; figures for 200 do not include 1991.

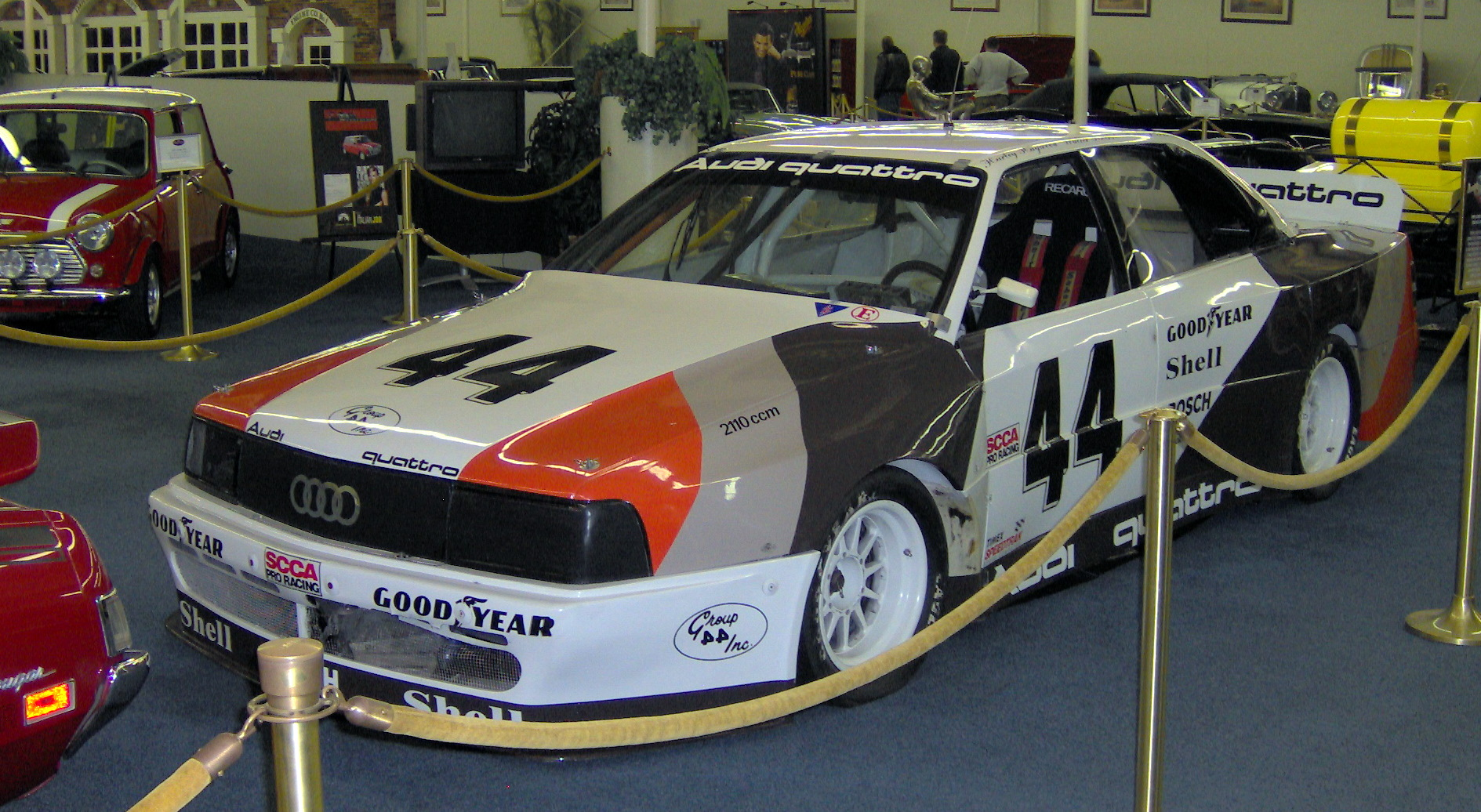
Audi 200 Quattro Trans AM

=== Motorsport ===
In 1988, Audi entered the Trans-Am Series with the 200 turbo quattro by contracting Bob Tullius Group 44 Racing. The car was equipped with the Quattro system. The car was piloted by Hurley Haywood and with both Walter Röhrl and Hans-Joachim Stuck won eight out of thirteen events. Audi moved to IMSA by the end of the season, the SCCA would change the regulation to a two-wheel drive only and banning cars with non-American engines. The Historic Trans-am & IMSA Group is dedicated to the preservation of the cars that ran in the SCCA Trans-am series and the similar IMSA GTO class from 1980 until 1991.

Audi also used the 200 Turbo Quattro 20v as their Group A rally car replacement for the aging Audi Quattro after the FIA elimination of Group B in 1986. The 1987 Group A 200 was driven by former World Rally Champions drivers Hannu Mikkola and Walter Röhrl. The Audi 200 became the first four-wheel-drive car to win the Safari Rally, with Hannu Mikkola driving, with it being the last win for Audi in the world rally championship. The 200 Quattro became the last car Audi campaigned in rallying as a manufacturing team.

=== Gallery ===
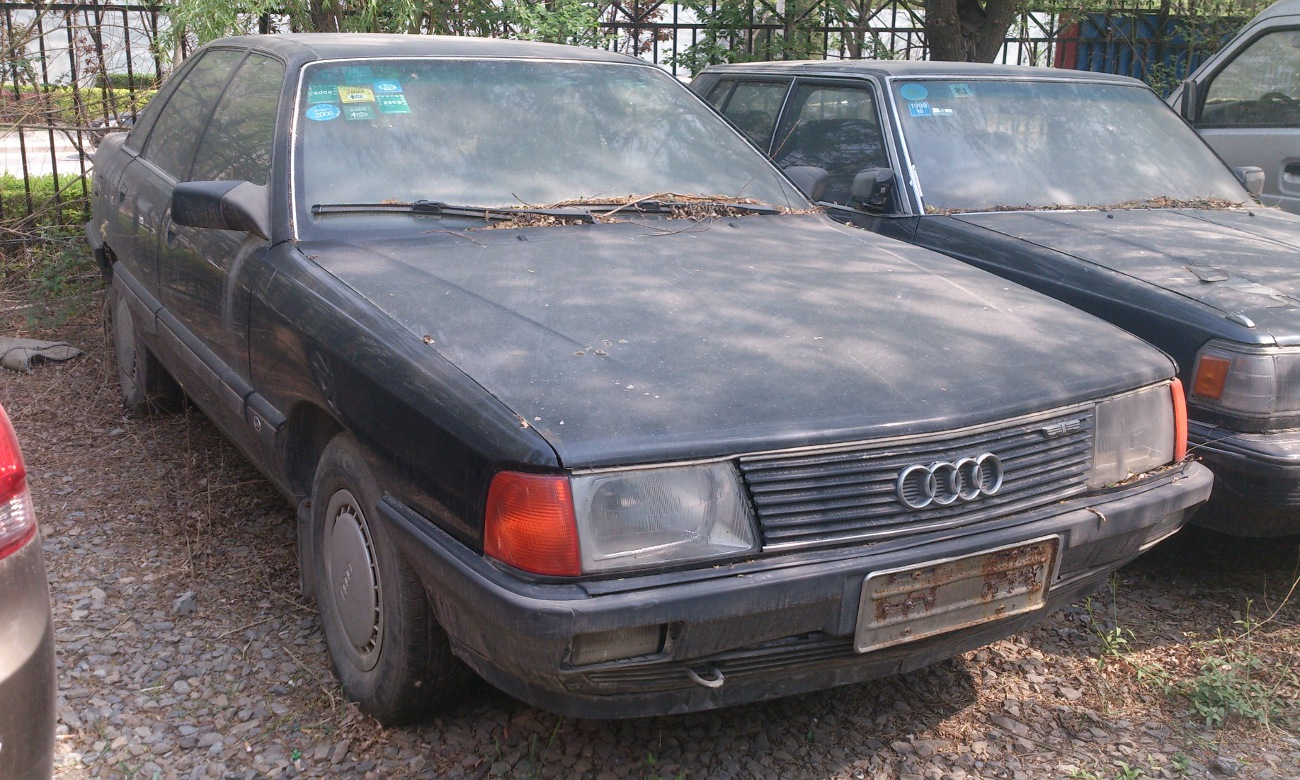
FAW-manufactured Audi 100

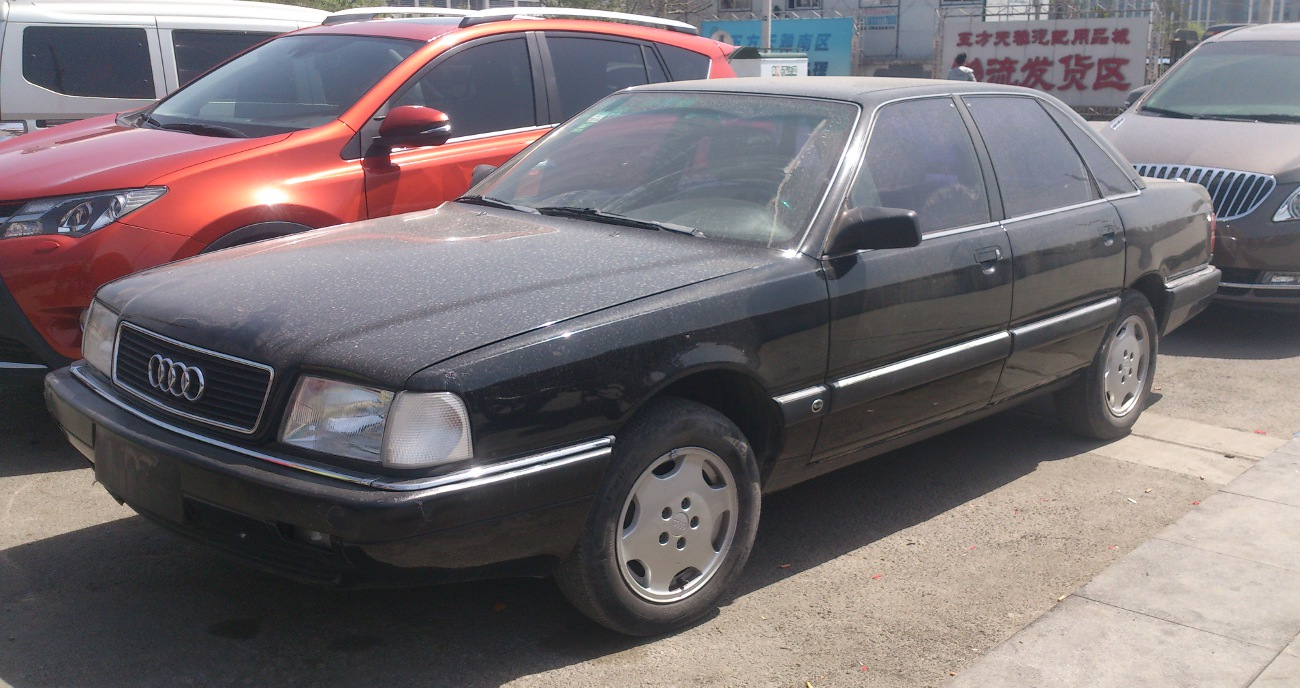
FAW Audi 200

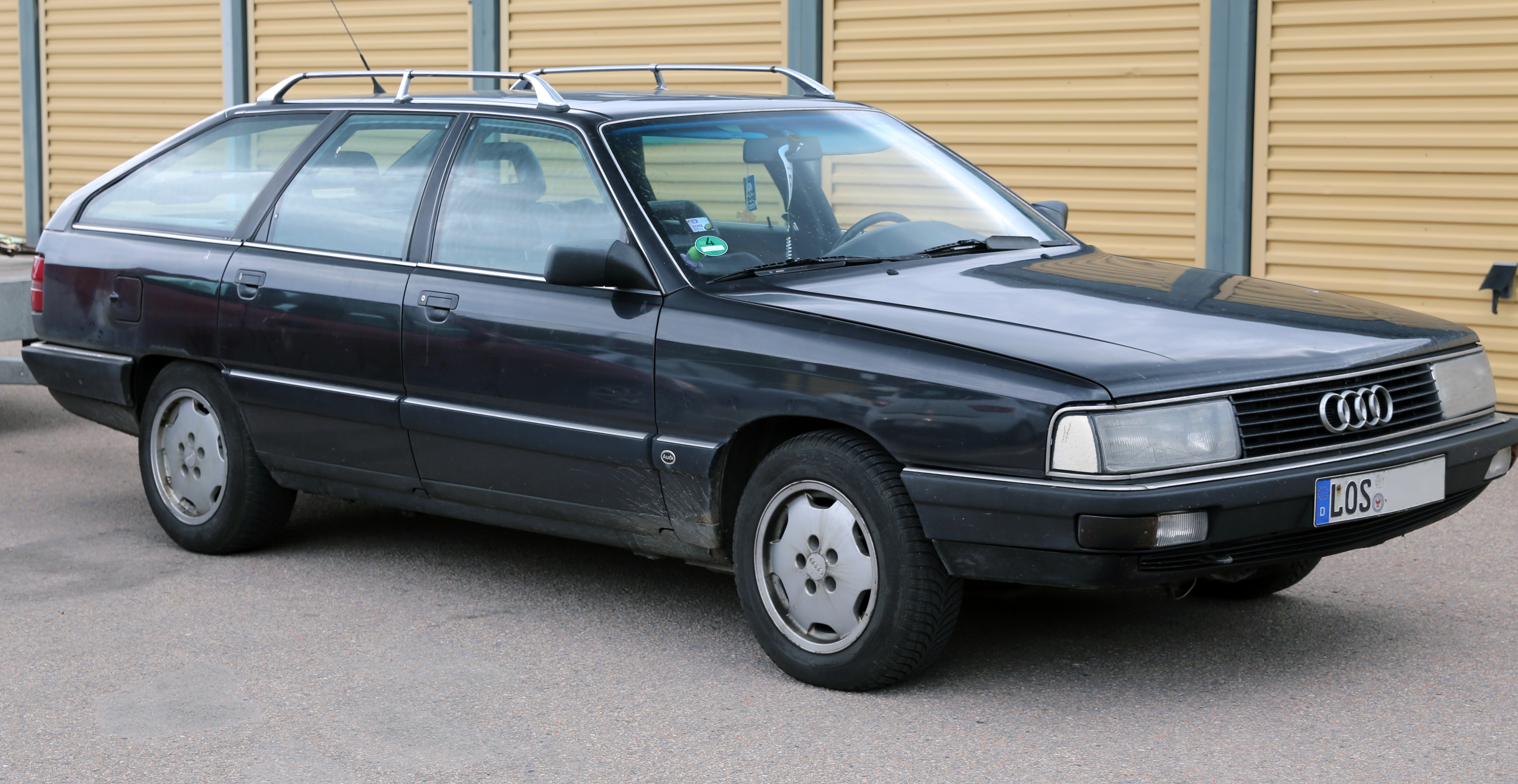
1990 facelift (Avant TDI)

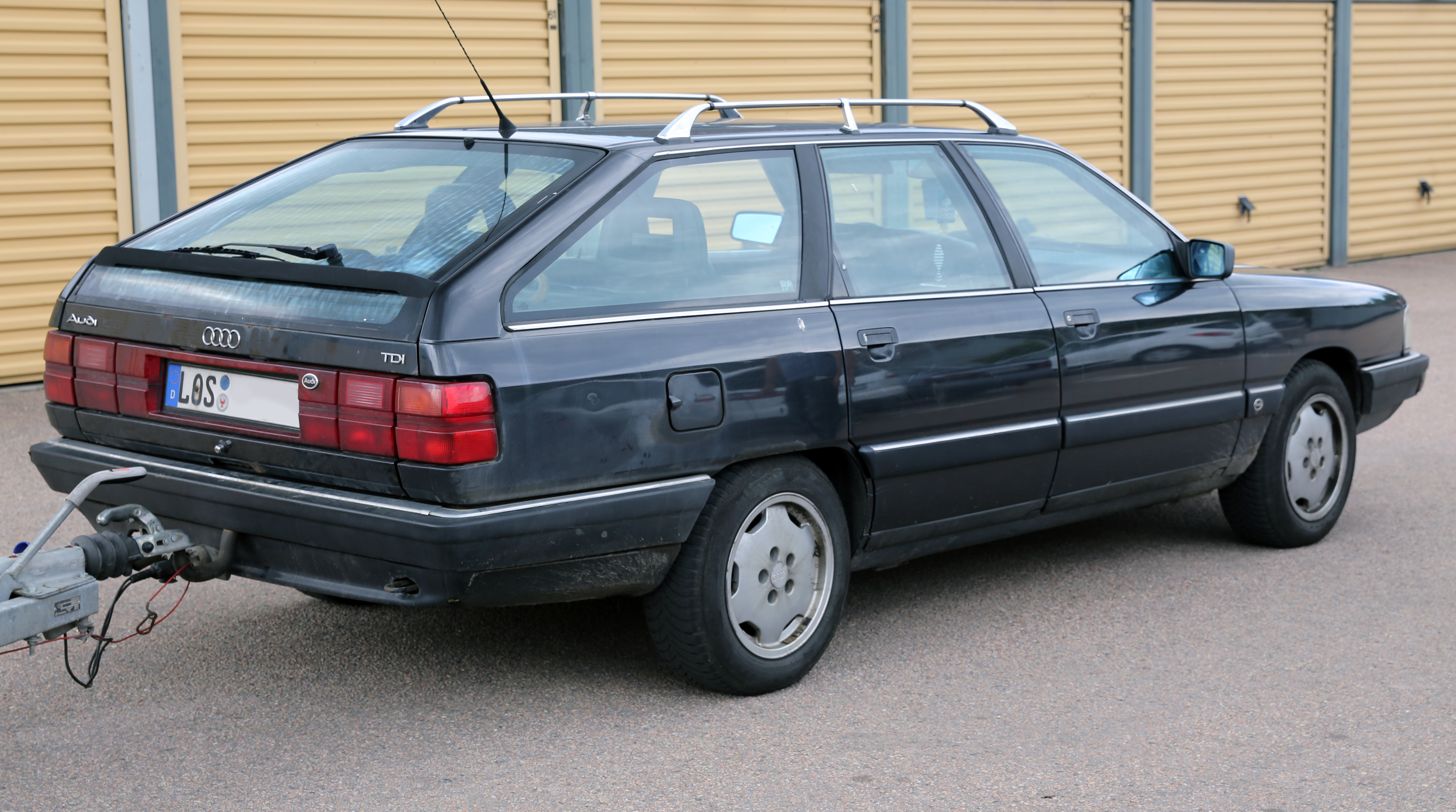
1990 facelift

== Audi 100 (C4, 1990–1994) ==
Audi 100 C4 (4A)
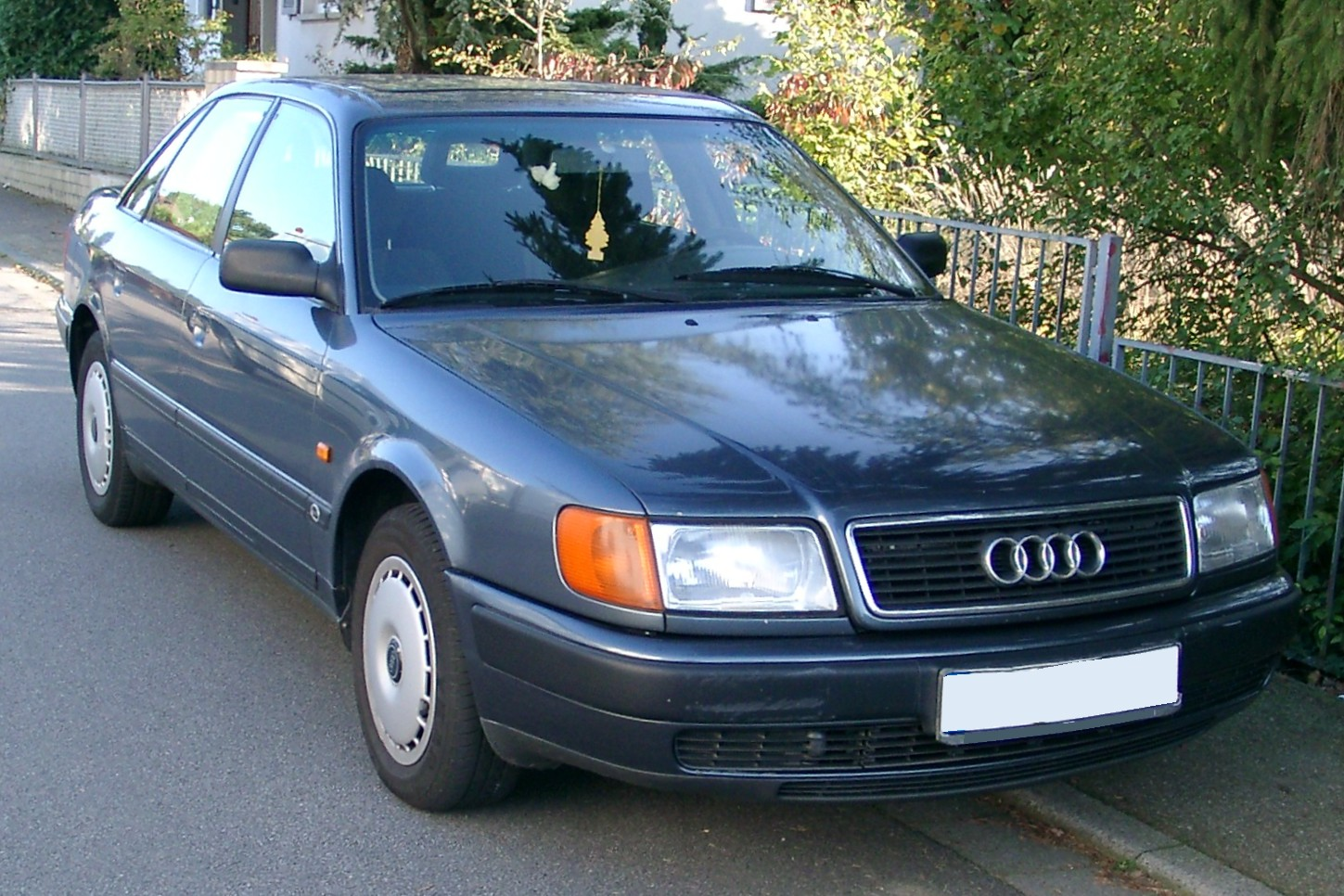

Overview
- Production: 1990–1994
- Assembly: Germany: Neckarsulm
- Designer: Erwin Leo Himmel (1987)

Body and chassis
- Body style: 4-door saloon/sedan 5-door estate/wagon
- Layout: Front engine, front-wheel drive / quattro permanent four-wheel drive
- Platform: Volkswagen Group C4 platform
- Related: Audi S4

Powertrain
- Engine: Petrol: 2.0 L I4; 2.0 L 16V I4; 2.2 L turbo 20V I5 (S4); 2.3 L I5; 2.6 L V6; 2.8 L V6; 4.2 L V8 (S4); Diesel: 2.4 L I5; 2.5 L TDI I5
- Transmission: 4-speed automatic 5-speed manual 6-speed manual

Dimensions
- Wheelbase: 105.8 in (2,687 mm) (FWD); 106 in (2,692 mm) (4WD)
- Length: 192.6 in (4,892 mm)
- Width: 70 in (1,778 mm)
- Height: 56.3 in (1,430 mm); 56.6 in (1,438 mm) (FWD saloon); 57 in (1,448 mm) (FWD Avant)
- Curb weight: 1,396–1,750 kg (3,078–3,858 lb)

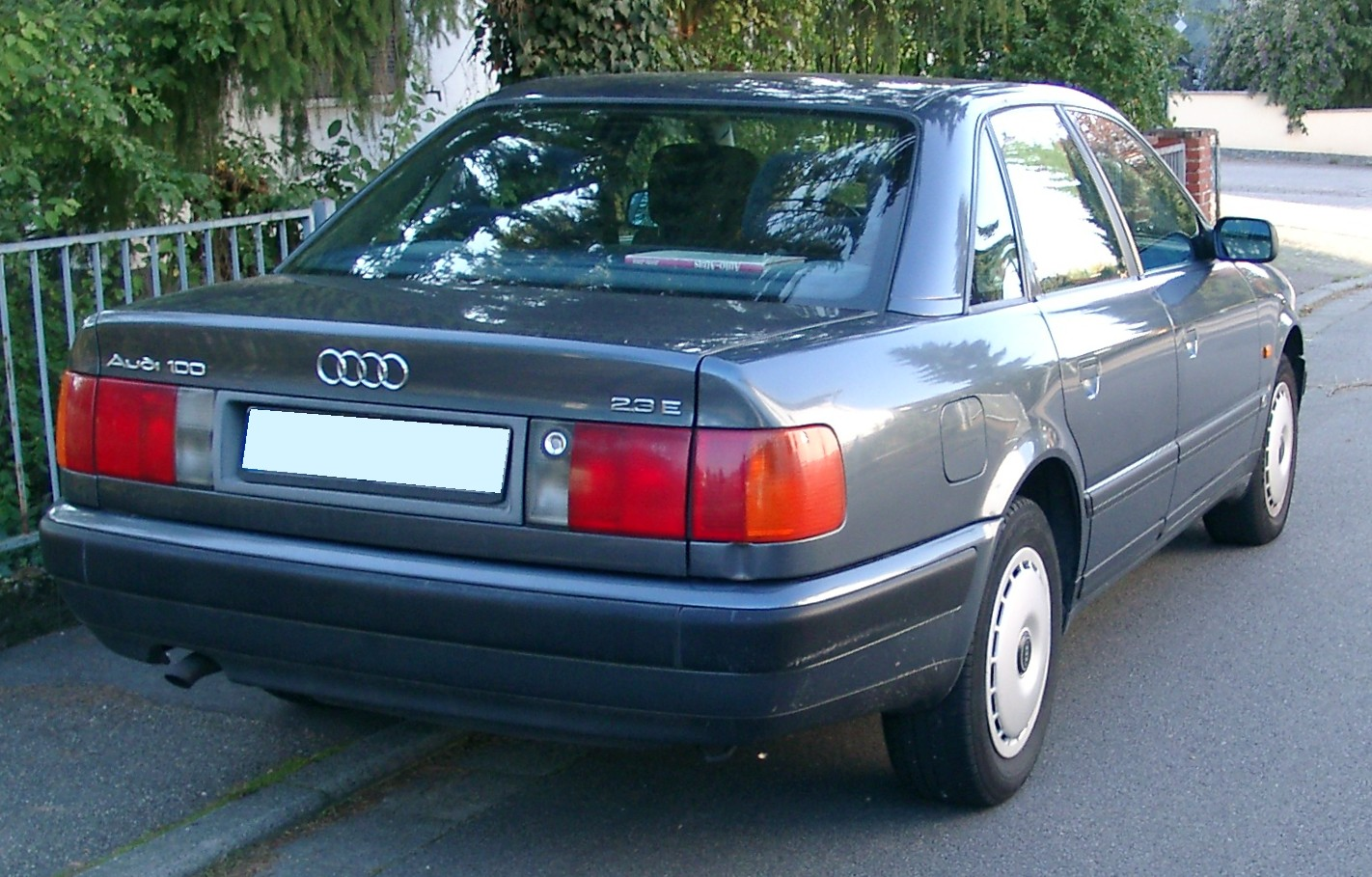
Sedan

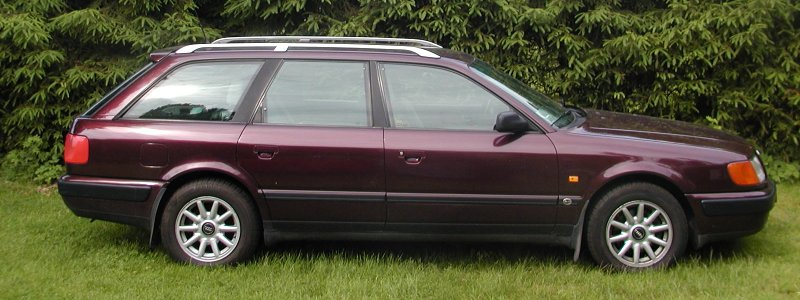
Avant

Audi released the C4 in late 1990 in Continental Europe and during 1991 in other markets, including the right-hand drive British market. It was a rebodied and updated C3, keeping the chassis, suspension, and most powertrains. The most significant mechanical changes were the new V6 engines and a wider track, increased by 4–5 cm (1.6–2.0 in) front and rear. The C3-platform Audi V8 continued to be sold as a separate line. The major change for the C4 was the introduction of a 2.8 L, 90-degree, SOHC 12v, V6 engine. It was later joined by a 2.6 L variant, of the same configuration as the 2.8 L unit. They are essentially the same engines offered in the 1992, B4 Audi 80. The option of quattro permanent four-wheel drive was an option across the range, except the smallest engines. The Audi 100 quattro was available with a ZF four-speed automatic and a 5 speed manual gearbox.

This generation was also available with the 2.5 litre, 5-cylinder TDI engine, introduced late in the C3 production, which provided outstanding performance, economy and refinement.

During 1994, in conjunction with some styling revisions, Audi dropped the Audi 100 tag, renaming it the A6 instead. In addition, the existing 100-derived Audi S4 became the S6. The S4 name was later reused for the high-performance derivative of the Audi A4 (replacement for the Audi 80). The Audi V8 had been replaced by the A8 in 1994.

The C4-based A6 continued until early 1998, when it was replaced by an all-new A6.

Engines

| Model | Displacement cc | Engine code | Engine type | Power at rpm kW (metric hp) | Torque at rpm N⋅m (lb⋅ft) | 0–100 km/h | Top speed km/h (mph) | Production dates | Note |
Petrol engines
| 100, 2.0 | 1984 | AAE | I4, SPI | 74 (101) at 5500 | 157 (116) at 2750 | 12.6 s | 182 (113) | 12.1990–07.1994 | |
| 100 2.0 E | 1984 | AAD, ABK | I4, MPI | 85 (115) at 5400 | 168 (124) at 3200 | 11.0 s | 191 (119) | 12.1990–07.1994 | |
| 100 2.0 E 16V | 1984 | ACE | 16V I4 | 103 (140) at 5900 | 185 (136) at 4500 | 10.1 s | 204 (127) | 01.1992–07.1994 | Only select export markets |
| S4 | 2226 | AAN | Turbo 20V I5 | 169 (230) at 5900 | 350 (258) at 1950 | 6.8 s | 244 (152) | 07.1991–07.1994 | |
| 2.3 E | 2309 | AAR | I5 | 98 (133) at 5500 | 186 (137) at 4000 | 10.2 s | 202 (126) | 12.1990–07.1994 | |
| 2.6 E | 2598 | ABC | V6 | 110 (150) at 5750 | 225 (166) at 3500 | 9.5 s | 210 (130) | 03.1992–07.1994 | |
| 2.8 E | 2771 | AAH | V6 | 128 (174) at 5500 | 245 (181) at 3000; 250 (184) at 3000 (Note: On Super Plus (98 octane) petrol) | 8.0 s | 218 (135) | 12.1990–07.1994 | |
| S4 4.2 | 4172 | ABH | 32V V8 | 206 (280) at 5800 | 400 (295) at 4000 | 6.2 s | 249 (155) | 10.1992–06.1994 | |
Diesel engines
| 2.4 D | 2370 | AAS | I5 | 60 (82) at 4400 | 164 (121) at 2400 | 16.8 s | 167 (104) | 05.1991–07.1994 | |
| 2.5 TDI | 2460 | AAT, AEL | TDI I5 | 85 (115) at 4250 | 265 (195) at 2250 | 11.1 s | 195 (121) | 04.1991–07.1994 | |

== Production in the Chinese market (1988–2005) ==
Chinese-built Audi 100
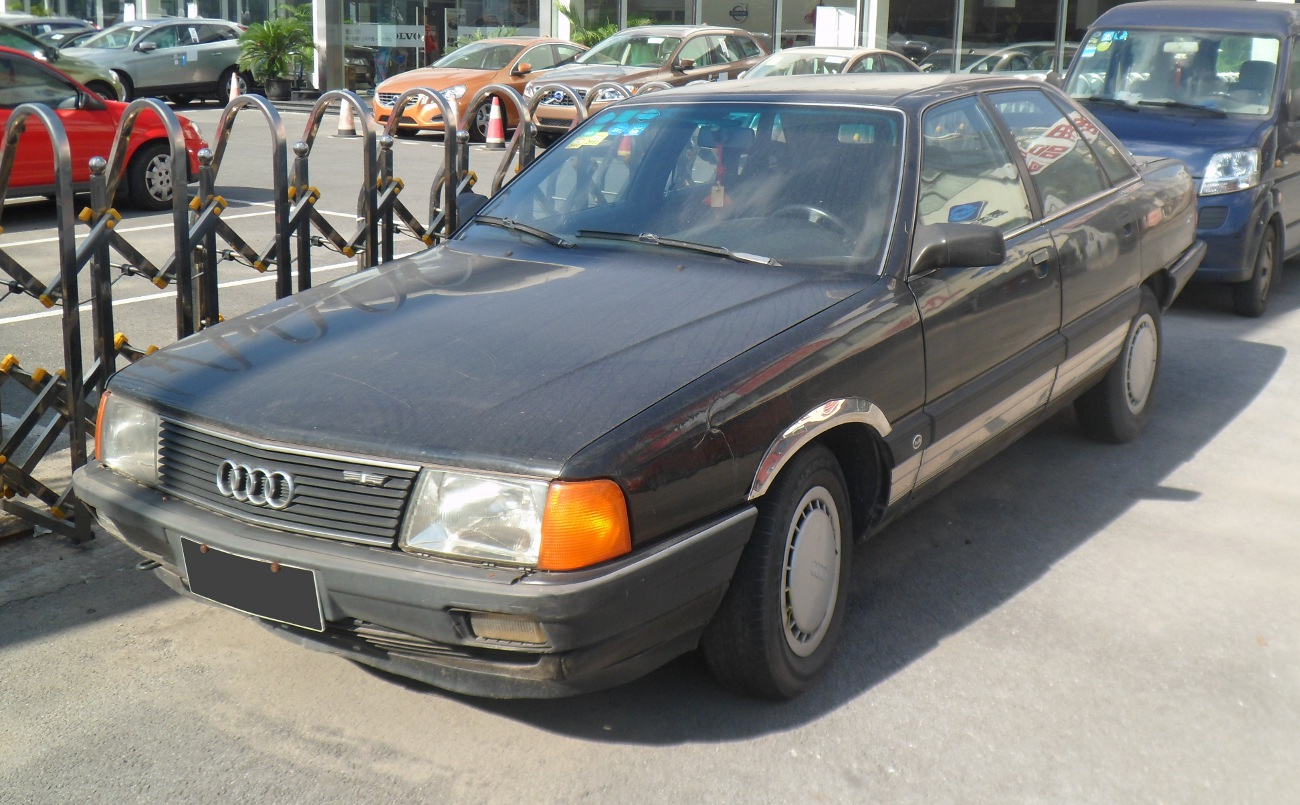
- Audi 100

Overview
- Also called: Hongqi Mingshi; Hongqi CA5020 XJH (station wagon); CA7180A2E/CA7200/CA7202/CA7220/CA7246L
- Production: 1988–1999 (China; FAW-VW - Audi 100/200); 1989–2005 (China; Hongqi - Hongqi CA7180A2E/CA7200 and CA7220/Limousine variants/CA1021U3 pickup truck)
- Assembly: China: Changchun (FAW-VW, Hongqi)

Body and chassis
- Body style: 4-door saloon/sedan 5-door estate/wagon 4-door coupe utility 4-door hearse/sedan delivery
- Platform: Volkswagen Group C3 platform

Powertrain
- Engine: 1.8 L QG18 I4 (CA7180/CA7180A2EL1); 1.8 L EA827 20V turbo I4; (Audi 200, Hongqi CA1021 U3, CA7220EL1); 2.0 L CA4GE I4 (Audi 100, Hongqi CA7200); 2.2 L CA488 I4; (Hongqi CA 1021U3, CA5020XJB police car, CA7202, CA7220A9E, CA7220A9E parade car, CA7220A9EL1/L2 cabrio-coach/L2 parade car, CA7220A9EL2A2 parade car, CA7220EL1, CA7226L); 2.2 L I5; (Hongqi CA7221L, CA7225LH, CA7228L, Audi 100); 2.0 L VG20E V6; (Hongqi CA7200E3L, CA7202, CA7202A9EL3L2, CA7202E3L/CA7202E3L1 Century Star); 2.4 L BFK V6; (Hongqi CA7242E6L/CA7242E6L1 Century Star, CA7246L); 2.5 L Audi V6 (CA7220L1, CA7247L); 2.6 L Audi V6; (Audi 200, Hongqi CA7226L, CA7240L)
- Transmission: 5-speed manual

Chronology
- Predecessor: Dongfeng CA71 (for Hongqi CA7220); Hongqi CA770 (for CA7225LH)
- Successor: Audi A6 (for Audi 100 and 200); Hongqi HQ430

The C3-platform Audi 100 was also produced in Changchun, China, by FAW (First Automotive Works, a Chinese automotive manufacturer) starting in August 1988. Most products in China were designed for government use at this time. All 100s manufactured as FAWs were front-wheel drive sedans with a 1.8 L inline-four motor or a 2.2 L inline-five motor.

In 1990, Politburo of the CCP approved a resolution to circumscribe car import and the engine displacement of cars equipped to officials. Furthermore, the resolution also prescribed that all cars of central departments of both Party and government must be domestically built. As the most luxurious and advanced cars made in China in early-1990s, FAW-Audi 100 and 200 had a high percentage of the Chinese high-class market of executive cars for nearly a decade, until the C3-platform cars was replaced by the C5-based Audi A6 in 1999.

During the negotiation between FAW and Volkswagen in late-1980s, Volkswagen acceded to FAW's suggestion of combining the C3 platform with previously introduced Chrysler engines in the new generation Hongqi (Red Flag). Hongqi CA7200 series with the technology of C3 were launched in mid-1990s, while most of C3 Audi 100 parts could be made in China. CA7200 were initially equipped with a 2.0 L or 2.2 L Chrysler four-cylinder engine, whose product line was introduced into China in 1987 - originally being intended for a version of the Dodge 600 to be produced there under the Hongqi brand. In 2005, new Nissan VQ20 engines replaced the original Chrysler unit.

A small number of C3 200s (originally with 2.6-liter V6 engine, later also with a turbocharged 1.8) were also built. The 200 entered production in 1996. The 1.8 litre Hongqi engine was known as the QG18 while the 1.8 turbo was Volkswagen's EA827 engine. The early C4 Audi 100 was also assembled in Changchun in small numbers. The C4 was largely built in the European-style body with European style headlights but had American style tail lights.

Hongqi production commenced in 1989 with the CA7225LH, a limousine based on the Audi 100 and was intended to replace the outdated Hongqi CA770. The CA7225LH debuted on October 1, the 40th anniversary of the People's Republic of China. None other than then-CCP general secretary Jiang Zemin, then-President Yang Shangkun and then-premier Li Peng sat in the car during a special exhibition in Beijing. It was extended 680 millimeters behind the C-pillar, creating a three-row car. In 1993, the car was facelifted and renamed the CA7221L, while in 1996 a police variant named the CA5020XJB started being built. In 1996, the first Hongqi-badged Audi 100 sedan was produced, and named the Hongqi CA7220. From that point on, the limousines would be based on the Hongqi sedan, and not directly the original Audi. As such, Hongqi's new facelifted limousine was the CA7228L in 1996. Soon, this model was further restyled and renamed the CA7226L and then the CA7220EL1. Initially, all these limousines were mostly available for the government and institutions, but during the later 1990s, many were also sold to private buyers. In 1997, the CA7220L1 was produced. This time it was not based on the Audi 100, but on the Audi V8 LWB. Only a dozen of these cars were built. The previous Audi 100 based limousine would now be facelifted and renamed the CA7240L, and then the CA7200E3L and CA7247L. In 2000, the car was heavily facelifted and modernized, but also renamed the CA7202E3L Century Star. In 2001, the CA7180A2EL1 Mingshi/Shiba was released. The limousine was based on the previous model, which came in two variants; the base Mingshi and the luxury Shiba. The model was then renamed the CA7202E3L1 Century Star, CA7242E6L1 Century Star, and CA7242E6L Century Star, in a series of restylings and upgrades. Production continued until 2005, when the car was replaced by the new Hongqi HQE.

The first Hongqi-badged Audi 100 sedan was produced in 1996. It had various names over its production, such as the Hongqi CA7220. Through some restylings and upgrades, it was built until 2005, where the Toyota Crown Majesta S180 replaced the Audi 100-based Hongqis as the successor under the name HQ3 and HQ430. Based on the sedan, a number of other variants such as station wagons and coupé utilities were also built, but in relatively small numbers. The Hongqi-badged Audi 100 sedans were the first mid-size 4-door sedans produced by FAW in any significant numbers since the Dongfeng CA71 of the 1960s.

In some variants the 2-litre Nissan VG20E V6 was also available as it had proved its use with Nissan's own large cars, being used in the Gloria and Cedric Y30.

All Chinese specification Audi 100s, 200s and Hongqi vehicles were front wheel drive and had a 5-speed manual gearbox as standard.

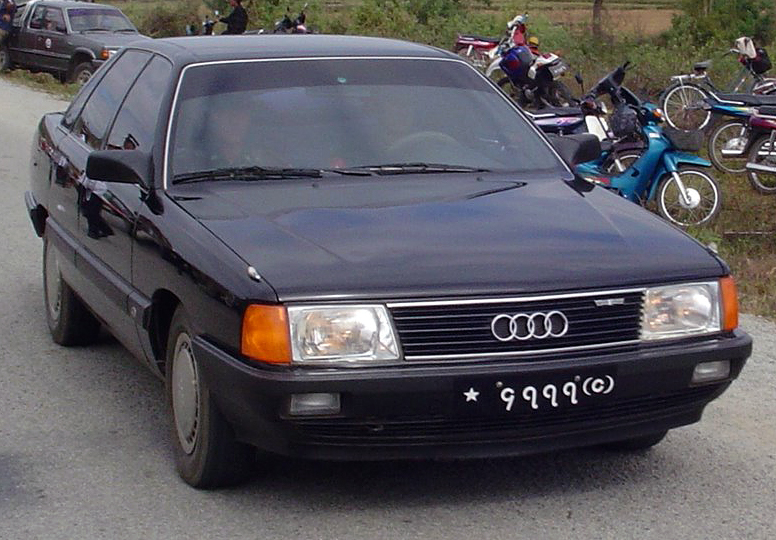
FAW Audi 100

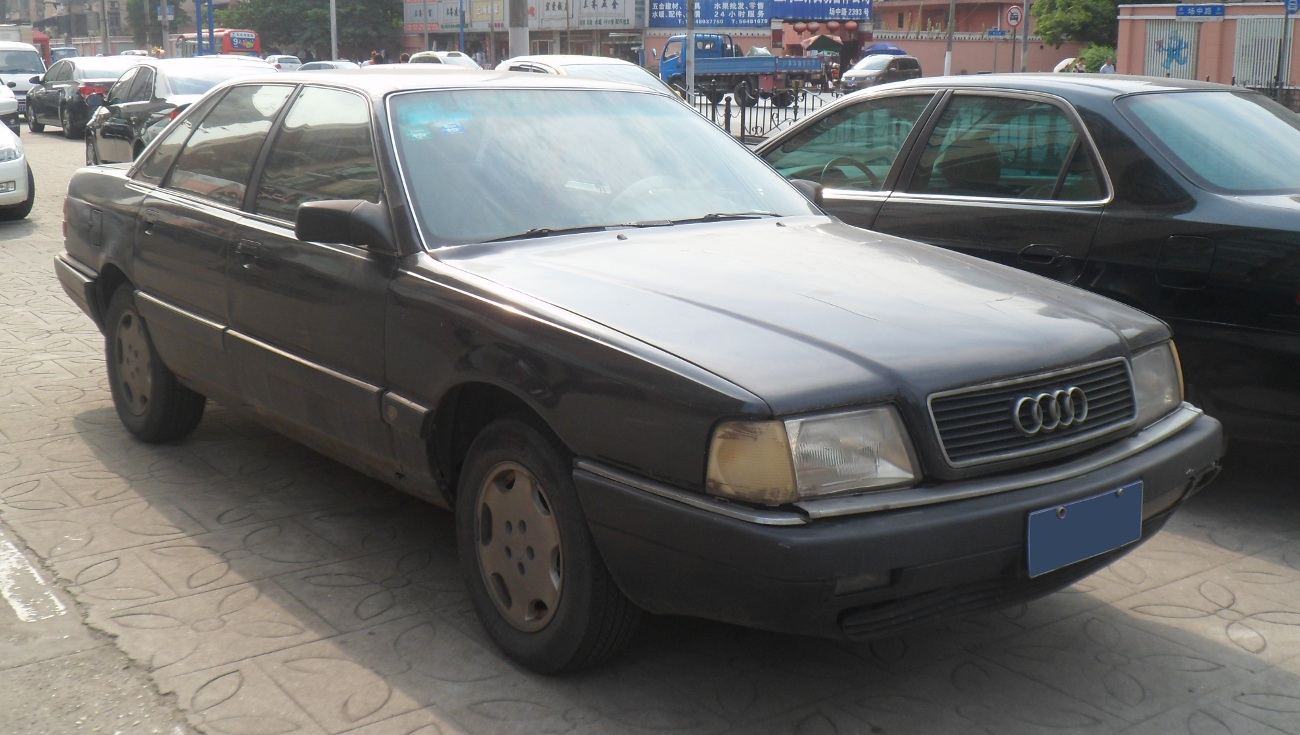
FAW Audi 200

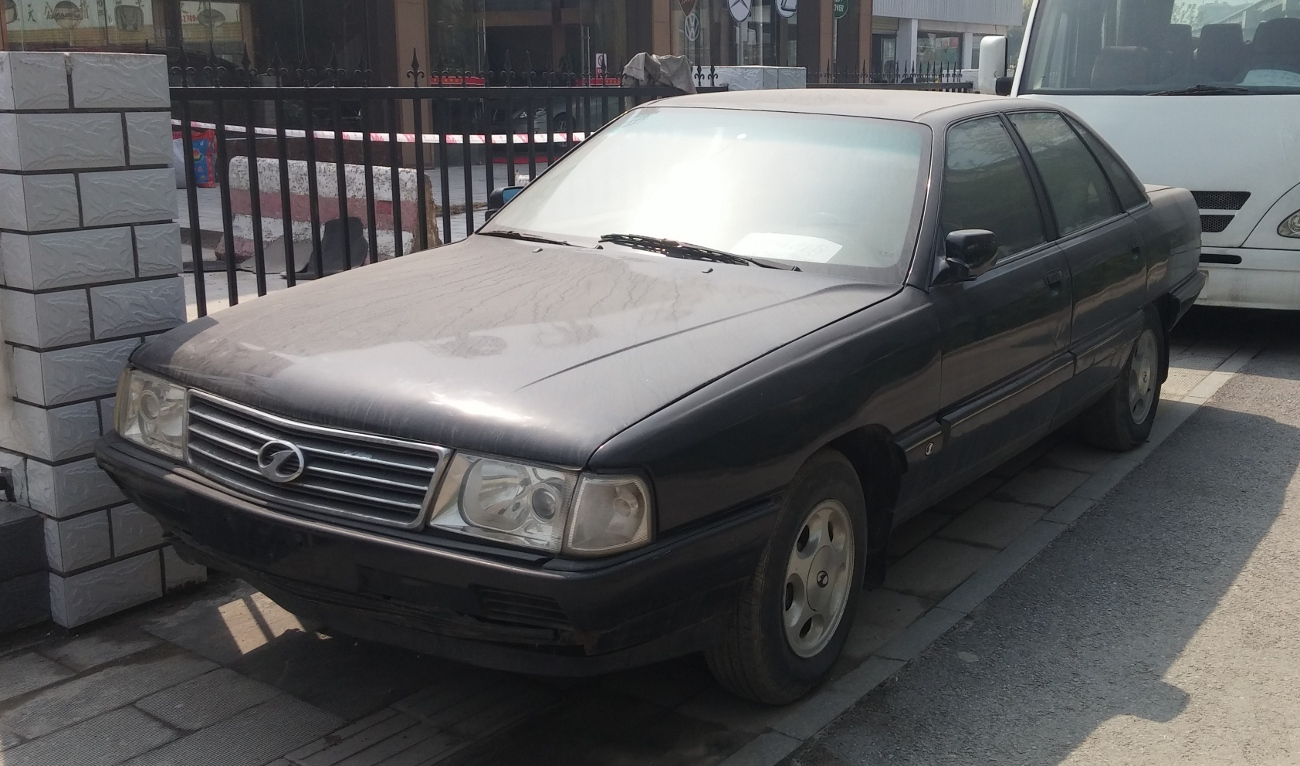
Hongqi CA7180A2E

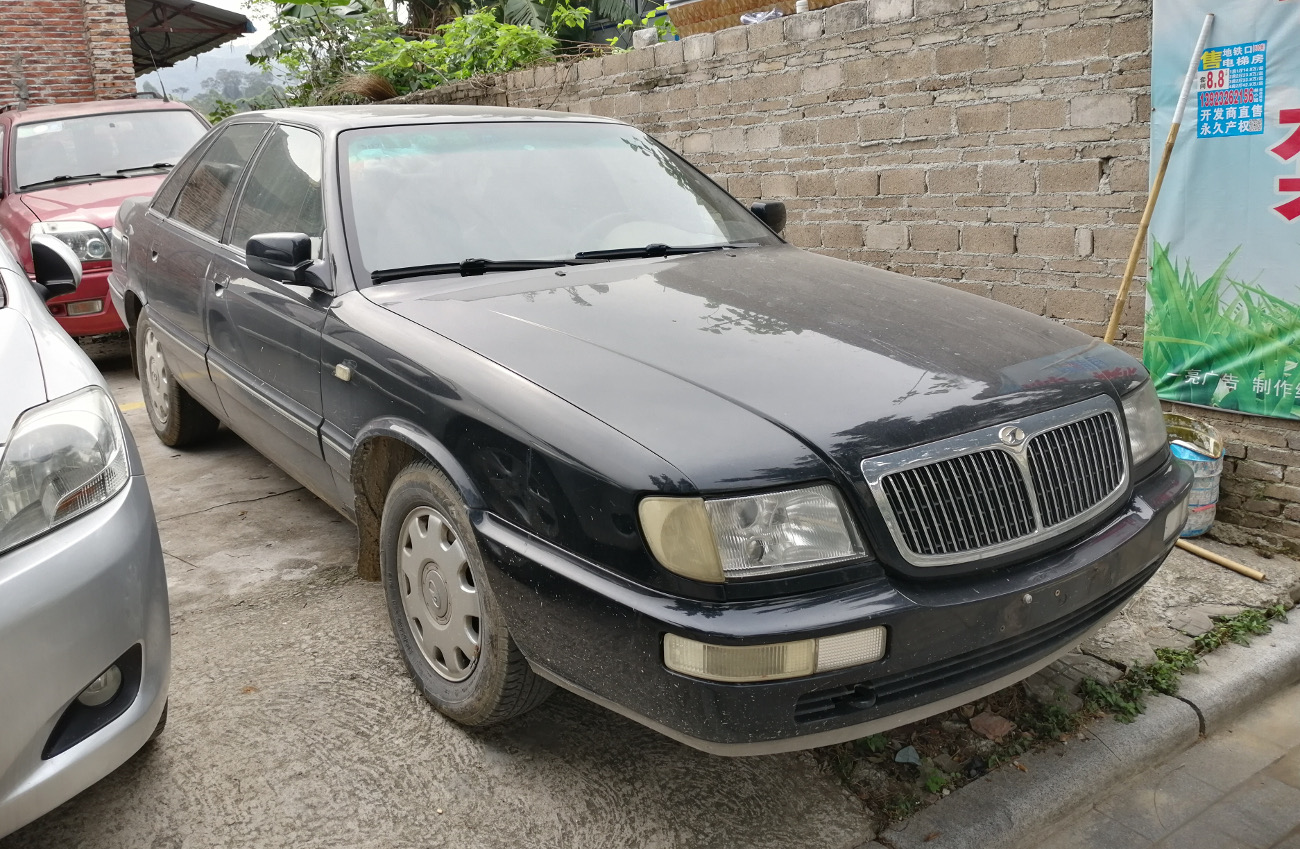
Hongqi CA7202E3

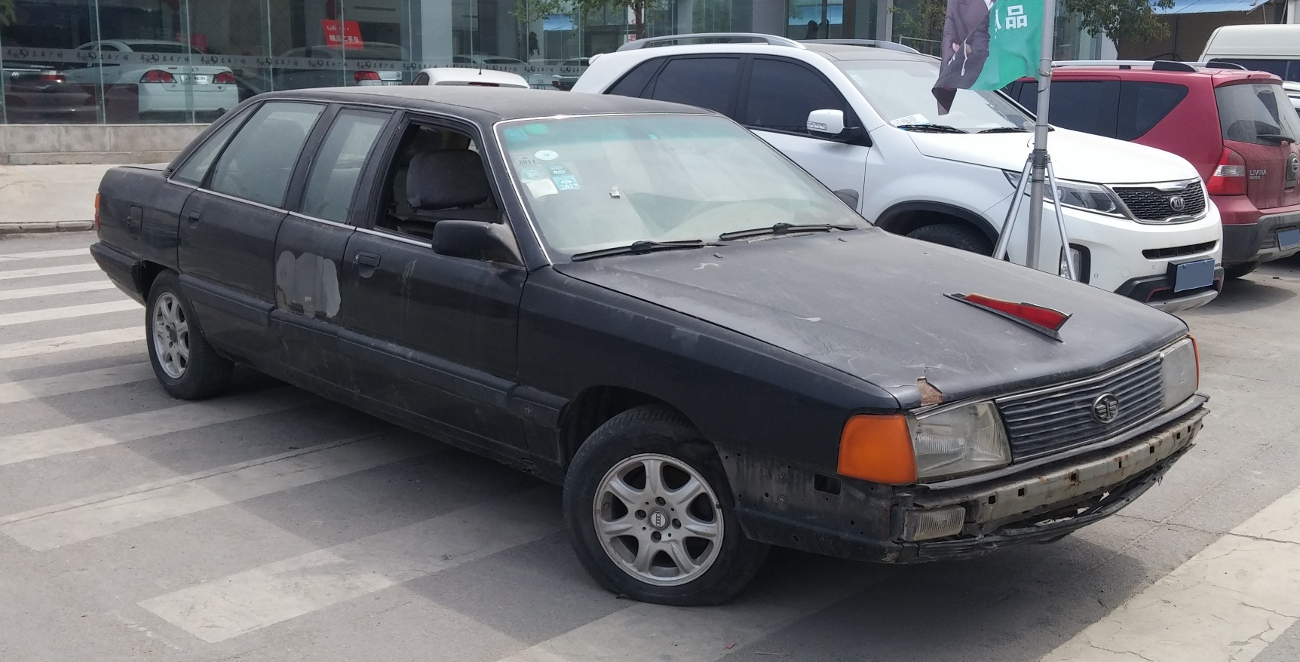
Hongqi CA7228L

== Audi Duo ==
At the Geneva Motor Show in March 1990 Audi presented its first iteration of the Audi Duo (or Audi 100 Avant Duo) experimental vehicle, a plug-in parallel hybrid based on the Audi 100 Avant quattro. This car had a 12.6 bhp (9.4 kW) Siemens electric motor which drove the rear wheels. A trunk-mounted nickel-cadmium battery supplied energy to the motor that drove the rear wheels. The vehicle's front wheels were powered by a 2.3-litre five-cylinder engine with an output of 136 PS (100 kW; 134 hp). The intent was to produce a vehicle which could operate on the engine in the country and electric mode in the city. Mode of operation could be selected by the driver. Ten vehicles are believed to have been made; one drawback was the extra weight of the electric drive, making vehicles less efficient when running on their engines alone than standard Audi 100s with the same engine.

In late 1991, Audi unveiled the second Duo generation – likewise based on the Audi 100 Avant quattro. Once again this featured an electric motor, a 28.6 PS (21 kW; 28 hp) three-phase machine, driving the rear wheels. This time, however, the rear wheels were additionally powered via the Torsen differential from the main engine compartment, which housed a 2.0-litre four-cylinder engine.

== Sales figures ==
Audi 100 US Sales Figures
| Year | US Sales |
|---|---|
| 1970 | 6,557 |
| 1971 | 18,179 |
| 1972 | 26,703 |
| 1973 | 31,065 |
| 1974 | 23,984 |
| 1975 | 20,334 |
| 1976 | 11,553 |
| 1977 | 7,671 |
| 1978 | 537 |
| - | Named Audi 5000 from 1978- 1988. |
| 1988 | 1,167 |
| 1989 | 2,777 |
| 1990 | |
| 1991 | |
| 1992 | 10,546 |
| 1993 | 6,685 |
| 1994 | 7,149 |
| 1995 | 9,568 |

Audi 5000 US Sales Figures
| Year | US Sales |
|---|---|
| 1978 | 20,761 |
| 1979 | 28,276 |
| 1980 | 27,802 |
| 1981 | 29,323 |
| 1982 | 25,094 |
| 1983 | 30,532 |
| 1984 | 48,318 |
| 1985 | 48,057 |
| 1986 | 40,513 |
| 1987 | 26,042 |
| 1988 | 7,256 |

== In popular culture ==
The phrase 'Audi 5000' gained popularity in the 1990s, meaning 'I'm out of here' or, 'I'm leaving'. Popular culture examples of this are collated in a publicly viewable dashboard. Variants include 'I'm Audi', 'I'm outtie', 'Outie 5000', and 'I'm Outtie five'.

In 2014 animated series All Hail King Julien, the titular protagonist refers to the car during an escape attempt, proclaiming, "We are so out of here: outie 5000!"

== Sources ==
- Covello, Mike (October 2001). Standard Catalog of Imported Cars, 1946-2002 (2nd ed.). Iola, WI: Krause Publications, Inc. p. 1. ISBN 978-0873416054.
- Werner, Oswald (2001). Deutsche Autos 1945–1990 [German Cars 1945-1990] (in German). Vol. 4. Stuttgart: Motorbuch Verlag. ISBN 3-613-02131-5.
