= 2005 Superstars Series =

Seasons
- ← 2004 2006 →

The 2005 Superstars Series season was the second season of the Campionato Italiano Superstars (Italian Superstars Championship). The championship was won by Tobia Masini driving for Audi.

== Teams and drivers ==
Team	Cars	No.	Drivers	Rounds
(Italy) CAAL Racing	BMW M5 E39	1	(Italy) Francesco Ascani	All
(Italy) CAAL Racing	BMW M5 E39	2	(Italy) Leonardo Baccarelli	3, 5-9
(Italy) CAAL Racing	BMW M5 E39	2	(Italy) Albert Colajanni	2, 4
(Italy) Lanza Motorsport	BMW M5 E39	5	(Italy) Mauro Simoncini	1, 3, 5, 9
(Italy) Vaccari Motori	BMW M5 E39	7	(Italy) Simone di Mario	4, 7-9
(Italy) Vaccari Motori	BMW M5 E39	8	(Italy) Marco Della Monica	1
(Italy) Motortech Racing	Jaguar S-Type R	9	(Italy) Giuliano Alessi	3-5
(Italy) Motortech Racing	Jaguar S-Type R	9	(Italy) Stefano Bonello	6-7, 9
(Italy) Motortech Racing	Jaguar S-Type R	9	(Italy) Oscar Venturato	9
(Italy) Motortech Racing	Jaguar S-Type R	10	(Italy) Alessandro Battaglin	3-9
(Italy) Max Team	BMW M5 E39	11	(Italy) Simone Galluzzo	All
(Italy) Max Team	BMW M5 E39	12	(Italy) Fabrizio Armetta	1-3
(Italy) Max Team	BMW M5 E39	12	(Italy) Alberto Cerrai	4
(Italy) Max Team	BMW M5 E39	12	(Italy) Albert Colajanni	6-7
(Italy) Scuderia La Torre	BMW M5 E39	14	(Italy) Riccardo Romagnoli	1-2
(Italy) I Motori di Carlotta	BMW M5 E39	14	(Italy) Enrico Uncini	4
(Italy) I Motori di Carlotta	BMW M5 E39	14	(Italy) Luca Marini	5-6
(Italy) I Motori di Carlotta	BMW M5 E39	18	(Italy) Giacomo Bertola	2-3
(Italy) I Motori di Carlotta	BMW M5 E39	18	(Italy) Fabrizio Armetta	4-9
(Italy) Scuderia Bigazzi	Audi RS6	56	(Italy) Tobia Masini	All
(Italy) Santucci Motorsport	BMW M5 E39	60	(Italy) Diego Alessi	9

== Calendar ==
Round	Circuit	Date	Pole position	Fastest lap	Winning driver	Winning team
1	(Italy) Adria	17 April	(Italy) Tobia Masini	(Italy) Francesco Ascani	(Italy) Francesco Ascani	(Italy) CAAL Racing
2	(Italy) Vallelunga	8 March	(Italy) Simone Galluzzo	(Italy) Fabrizio Armetta	(Italy) Simone Galluzzo	(Italy) Max Team
3	(Italy) Imola	19 June	(Italy) Tobia Masini	(Italy) Tobia Masini	(Italy) Tobia Masini	(Italy) Scuderia Bigazzi
4	(Italy) Mugello	4 July	(Italy) Simone Galluzzo	(Italy) Simone Galluzzo	(Italy) Simone Galluzzo	(Italy) Max Team
5	(Italy) Magione	24 July	(Italy) Fabrizio Armetta	(Italy) Tobia Masini	(Italy) Fabrizio Armetta	(Italy) I Motori di Carlotta
6	(Italy) Varano	11 September	(Italy) Simone Galluzzo	(Italy) Tobia Masini	(Italy) Tobia Masini	(Italy) Scuderia Bigazzi
7	(Italy) Monza	25 September	(Italy) Fabrizio Armetta	(Italy) Tobia Masini	(Italy) Fabrizio Armetta	(Italy) I Motori di Carlotta
8	(Italy) Adria	9 October	(Italy) Tobia Masini	(Italy) Fabrizio Armetta	(Italy) Tobia Masini	(Italy) Scuderia Bigazzi
9	(Italy) Misano	23 October	(Italy) Fabrizio Armetta	(Italy) Fabrizio Armetta	(Italy) Fabrizio Armetta	(Italy) I Motori di Carlotta
