= Superstars Series =

Touring car championship based in Europe

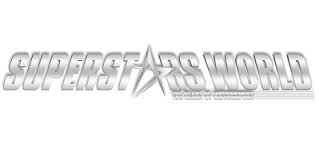
- Category: Touring cars
- Country: International
- Inaugural season: 2004
- Folded: 2013
- Drivers: 28 (2014)
- Teams: 10 (2013)
- Tyre suppliers: Hankook
- Last Drivers' champion: (Italy) Francesco Sini
- Last Teams' champion: (Italy) Audi Sport Italia
- Official website: www.superstarsworld.com

The Superstars International Series was a production-based touring car racing championship held between 2004 and 2013. It was managed by the "Superstars World of Racing SpA", SWR, a company of FG Group with headquarters in Rome and sanctioned by the Automobile Club d'Italia (ACI) and the Commissione Sportiva Automobilistica Italiana (CSAI). FG GROUP, led by Maurizio Flammini, is famous for having promoted the FIM World Superbike Championship from its beginnings in 1988 until its sale to Infront Sports & Media in 2007.

Superstars Series logo used from 2010 to 2011

After the shutdown of the promoter SWR in late 2013, the competition has been re-branded as EuroV8 Series and organized by FG Group and ATT (Associazione Team Top cars). SuperTouringSeries is going to be performed by Pan Asia Racing Enterprise Ltd. (PARE Ltd) in 2015. However, it has been cancelled.

The new championship’s identity, partners, teams, sporting regulations and calendar was unveiled at the Autosport International show in January 2014.

== History ==
The series began in 2004 as Trofeo Nazionale Superstars (Superstars National Trophy) with a six race schedule, all the events held at Italian tracks. The initial field was made of BMW M5 and Jaguar S-Type models, entered by five teams.

From 2005 the series became the Campionato Italiano Superstars (Italian Superstars Championship), and soon became the main tin-top auto racing series of the country, replacing the Italian Superturismo Championship (folded in 2007).

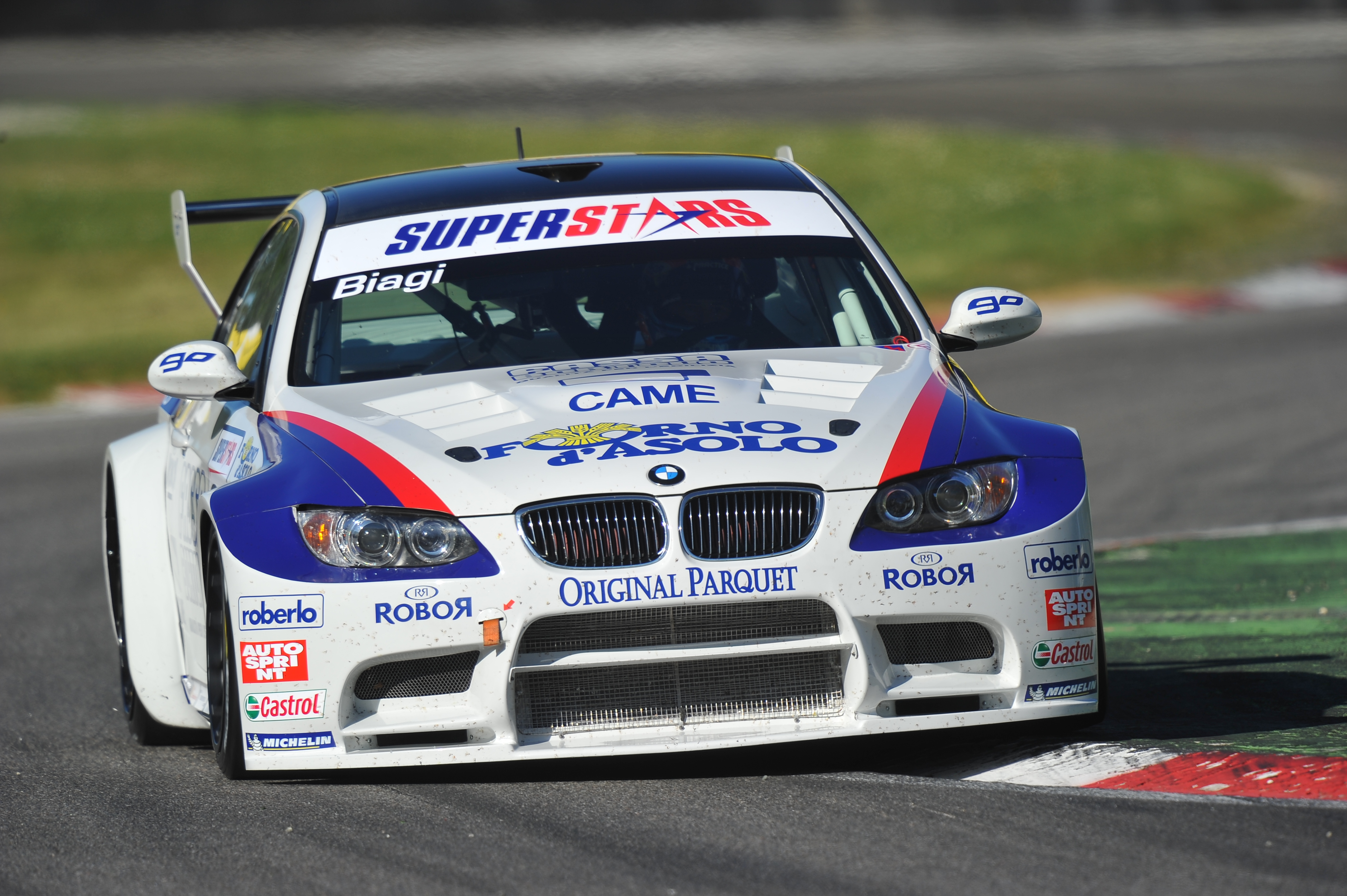
BMW racing in the Superstars Series

In 2007 the series started to visit circuits in other European countries as the FIA approved International Superstars Series. Since then every season awards two different drivers' titles, one for the International Series and one for the Italian Championship. Points are gained for the Italian Championship at each Italian and one European race meeting.

With the 2010 season a new series was added, the International GTSprint Series allowing GT2, GT3 and nationally-homologated GTs. Uniquely, however, it has two 25 minute sprint events per weekend rather than the usual two-driver, long-distance runs that are the norm in GT competition.

The 2012 season saw the growth of the series in terms of media and spectators - attracting 33,000 fans to its race at Vallelunga in Rome on October 7, 2012. Johan Kristoffersson won the championship in his KMS Audi RS5 after a season long battle with Vitantonio Liuzzi and his CAAL Racing Mercedes AMG C63. Kristoffersson's success in Superstars proved a strong element in advancing his career.

The 2013 calendar contains eight races in 6 countries. The series promoters have given the series an umbrella name "The Superstars World of Racing" that reflects its international growth and refers to the entire weekend of events which includes The Superstars International Series, the GT Sprint International Series, local support races and entertainment events.

== Format and philosophy ==
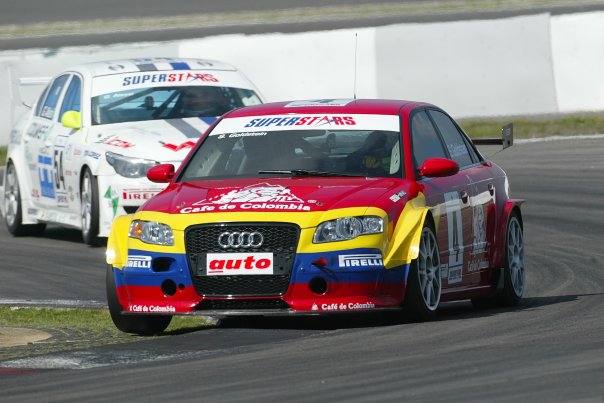
Audi RS4 of the Superstars Series

Since 2009 the Series has run a two sprint race format. Race 1 to take place Sunday morning and Race 2 to take place Sunday afternoon.

The technical regulations are designed to bring the largest touring cars together in a balanced competition that limits costs, maximizes spectacle and limits driver assistance. A total of 10 brands will be represented in the 2013 edition: Audi RS5, BMW M3, Cadillac CTS-V, Chevrolet Lumina and Camaro, Chrysler 300C SRT8, Jaguar XF, Lexus ISF, Maserati Quattroporte, Mercedes C63AMG, Porsche Panamera.

== Technical regulations ==
=== Final season ===
The 2013 Superstars championships are reserved for production-based saloon cars with the following basic characteristics:

- Otto cycle engines with 6 to 12 cylinders (Wankel engines not allowed)
- forced induction (turbochargers or superchargers) allowed if used in the production car
- minimum displacement of 3800 cc
- production H-pattern gearbox or approved mechanical sequential gearbox (automatic and semiautomatic transmission are forbidden)
- four or two doors body style
- homologated for at least 4 passengers

Each homologated car must comply with a technical sheet issued by the Permanent Bureau, which contains the technical description of all the car's components, both originals and belonging to technical kits.

=== Eligible cars ===
Homologation	Make	Model	Engine	Optional engine(s)
STS-0001/06	Audi	RS4 (B7)	Audi BNS (4.2 litre V8)	
STS-0004/06	BMW	550i (E60)	BMW N62B48 (4.8 litre V8)	
STS-0005/08	Cadillac	CTS-V	GM LS2 (6.0 litre V8)	GM LS3 (6.2 litre V8), GM LS7 (7.0 litre V8)
STS-0006/08	BMW	M3 (E90)	BMW S65B40 (4.0 litre V8)	
STS-0007/08	Chrysler	300C SRT8	Chrysler Hemi ESF (6.1 litre V8)	Mopar 426 Hemi (7.0 litre V8)
STS-0008/08	Mercedes-Benz	C63 AMG (W204)	Mercedes-AMG M156 (6.2 litre V8)	
STS-0009/08	Chevrolet	Lumina CR8	GM LS3 (6.2 litre V8)	
STS-0010/09	BMW	M3 Coupé (E92)	BMW S65B40 (4.0 litre V8)	
STS-0011/09	Maserati	Quattroporte	Ferrari F136U (4.2 litre V8)	Ferrari F136Y (4.7 litre V8)
STS-0012/10	Jaguar	XFR	Jaguar AJ-133 (5.0 litre V8 S/C)	
STS-0013/10	Audi	RS5 (B8)	Audi CFS (4.2 litre V8)	
STS-0014/10	Porsche	Panamera S	Porsche M48/20 (4.8 litre V8)	
STS-0016/10	Lexus	IS-F	Toyota 2UR-GSE (5.0 litre V8)	
STS-0017/12	Mercedes-Benz	C63 AMG Coupé (C204)	Mercedes-AMG M156 (6.2 litre V8)	
STS-0018/13	Chevrolet	Camaro SS	GM LS3 (6.2 litre V8)	

Note: Chevrolet Lumina CR8 is a badge engineering of HSV Clubsport R8.

=== Expired homologations ===
Cars no longer eligible:

Homologation	Make	Model	Engine	Optional engine(s)	Last season
	Audi	RS6 (C5)	Audi BCY (4.2 litre V8 twin-turbo)		2006
STS-0002/04	BMW	M5 (E39)	BMW S62B50 (4.9 litre V8)		2011
STS-0003/04	Jaguar	S-Type R	Jaguar AJ-34S (4.2 litre V8 S/C)		2011
STS-0015/10	Jaguar	XF SV8	Jaguar AJ-34S (4.2 litre V8 S/C)	Jaguar AJ-133 (5.0 litre V8 S/C)	2011

== Sporting regulations ==
=== Scoring system ===
The scoring system has been revised for 2009 season.

Position	1st	2nd	3rd	4th	5th	6th	7th	8th	9th	10th	Pole	Fastest Lap
Points	20	15	12	10	8	6	4	3	2	1	1	1

Since 2012 an additional point is awarded to every driver in the starting grid of each race.

== Champions ==
Superstars Series

Season	Campionato Italiano Superstars		International Superstars Series	
Season	Driver Champion	Team Champion	Driver Champion	Team Champion
2004	(Italy) Francesco Ascani (BMW M5 (E39))	(Italy) CAAL Racing	not held	
2005	(Italy) Tobia Masini (Audi RS6 (C5))	(Italy) CAAL Racing	not held	
2006	(Italy) Max Pigoli (Jaguar S-Type R)	(Italy) Audi Sport Italia	not held	
2007	(Italy) Gianni Morbidelli (Audi RS4 (B7))	not awarded	(Italy) Giuliano Alessi (BMW 550i)	(Italy) CAAL Racing
2008	(Italy) Gianni Morbidelli (Audi RS4 (B7))	not awarded	(Italy) Stefano Gabellini (BMW 550i)	(Italy) CAAL Racing
2009	(Italy) Gianni Morbidelli (BMW M3 (E90))	(Italy) CAAL Racing	(Italy) Gianni Morbidelli (BMW M3 (E90))	not awarded
2010	(Italy) Thomas Biagi (BMW M3 (E92))	not awarded	(Italy) Thomas Biagi (BMW M3 (E92))	(Italy) Team BMW Italia
2011	(Italy) Alberto Cerqui (BMW M3 (E92))	not awarded	(Italy) Andrea Bertolini (Maserati Quattroporte)	(Italy) Team BMW Italia
2012	(Sweden) Johan Kristoffersson (Audi RS5)	not awarded	(Sweden) Johan Kristoffersson (Audi RS5)	(Italy) Dinamic Motorsport
2013	(Italy) Gianni Morbidelli (Audi RS5)	not awarded	(Italy) Gianni Morbidelli (Audi RS5)	(Italy) Audi Sport Italia

EuroV8 Series

Season	Driver Champion	Team Champion
2014	(Italy) Francesco Sini (Chevrolet Camaro SS)	(Italy) Audi Sport Italia

=== Trophies ===
Superstars Series

Season	Rookie Trophy	Senior Car Trophy	Stars Drivers Trophy
2009	(Italy) Pierluigi Martini (Chrysler 300C SRT-8)	(Italy) Mauro Cesari (BMW M5 (E39))	not awarded
2010	(Italy) Alberto Cola (Audi RS4 (B7))	(Italy) Alberto Cola (Audi RS4 (B7))	not awarded
2011	(Italy) Alberto Cerqui (BMW M3 (E92))	not awarded	(Italy) Francesco Ascani (BMW M3 (E90))
2012	(Sweden) Johan Kristoffersson (Audi RS5)	not awarded	(Italy) Nico Caldarola (Mercedes-Benz C63 AMG)
2013	(Belgium) Laurens Vanthoor (Audi RS5)	not awarded	(Italy) Gianni Giudici (BMW M3 (E92))

== Media coverage ==
=== Television coverage ===
In 2012 the Superstars Series received live and as-live broadcast in 103 countries with total distribution reaching 195 territories. The 2012 TV media value, as per data from wige and sport+Markt, was €56 million.

=== Video games ===
In 2009, the championship made its video game debut Superstars V8 Racing which features the 2008 championship. A sequel named Superstars V8 Next Challenge was released in February 2010, featuring the 2009 season.

== See also ==
- Italian Superturismo Championship
