= Tobia Masini =

Italian racing driver

Tobia Masini (born 8 December 1976 in Poggibonsi) is an Italian auto racing driver.

== Career ==
Masini spent some time racing in the United Kingdom, finishing as runner-up in the 1999 Renault Spider Championship behind Andy Priaulx. He went on to compete in the European Touring Car Championship with a Super Production Alfa Romeo 156. In 2005, he was champion of the Italian Superstars Series driving an Audi RS6.

Sporting positions
Preceded by Francesco Ascani	Superstars Series Champion; 2005	Succeeded by Max Pigoli
