= 2004 Superstars Series =

Seasons
- ← none 2005 →

The 2004 Superstars Series was the first season of the Campionato Italiano Superstars (Italian Superstars Championship). The championship was won by Francesco Ascani driving for BMW.

== Teams and drivers ==
Team	Car	No.	Drivers	Rounds
(Italy) Max Team	BMW M5 E39	1	(Italy) Simone Galluzzo	2, 5-6
(Italy) Max Team	BMW M5 E39	6	(Italy) Massimo di Risio	6
(Italy) Vaccari Motori	BMW M5 E39	2	(Italy) Gianluigi Picchi	1, 5
(Italy) Vaccari Motori	BMW M5 E39	2	(Italy) Nicola Tesini	2
(Italy) Vaccari Motori	BMW M5 E39	2	(Italy) Riccardo Cinti	4
(Italy) Vaccari Motori	BMW M5 E39	3	(Italy) Riccardo Cinti	1-2
(Italy) Vaccari Motori	BMW M5 E39	3	(Italy) Maurizio Flammini	5
(Italy) Vaccari Motori	BMW M5 E39	3	(Italy) Leonardo Baccarelli	6
(Italy) Lanza Motorsport	BMW M5 E39	5	(Italy) Mauro Simoncini	All
(Italy) RF Racing	Jaguar S-Type R	7	(Italy) Alexandra Gallo	1, 3-5
(Italy) RF Racing	Jaguar S-Type R	7	(Italy) Elisa Giordan	6
(Italy) RF Racing	Jaguar S-Type R	8	(Italy) Fulvio Cavicchi	1, 3, 5-6
(Italy) CAAL Racing	BMW M5 E39	11	(Italy) Francesco Ascani	All
