= 2014 EuroV8 Series =

First Euro series

Seasons
- ← 2013 (Superstars) none →

The 2014 EuroV8 Series was the first and only season of the EuroV8 Series, a series formed using the machinery from the Superstars Series, which folded after the 2013 season. The series was re-branded by the FG Group and the Associazione Team Top Car (ATT) for the 2014 season.

Three drivers went into the final round at Hockenheim with a chance of winning the drivers' championship title. Audi Sport Italia/SMR driver Tomáš Kostka went into the event with a two-point championship lead over Nicola Baldan of the Roma Racing Team, while Solaris Motorsport's Francesco Sini was also in contention, thirteen points in arrears of Kostka's lead. Kostka extended his lead by adding the pole position point to his tally, but after an eventful race, it was Sini who prevailed. Sini won the race with an extra point for fastest lap, while Kostka finished down in fourth place after contact with Sini's team-mate Giovanni Berton and Diego Romanini – breaking a halfshaft and causing a puncture respectively – which gave Sini the title by one point. Baldan had already been eliminated from contention after being involved in a first lap incident with Team BMW Dinamic team-mates Max Mugelli and Niccolò Mercatali.

Sini and Kostka shared the most wins during the season with three each, while Baldan only won once, at Mugello. Mercatali also won at Mugello, with the only other driver to win a race during the season being Eddie Cheever III, who won both races at the season opening round at Monza. Despite only competing at that event, Cheever was the winner of the Under-25 trophy by a single point from Jonathan Giacon. The teams' championship went to Audi Sport Italia/SMR, as Kostka was supported by four podium finishes for team-mates Davide Stancheris, Ermanno Dionisio and Emanuele Zonzini; they won the title by ten points ahead of Solaris Motorsport. Dionisio accrued the most points in the trophy for gentleman drivers, finishing 11 points clear of Leonardo Baccarelli, while the Speedy Trophy for most fastest laps went to Kostka, with 4.

== Teams and drivers ==
Team	Car	No.	Drivers	Rounds
(San Marino) Audi Sport Italia	Audi RS5	01	(Czech Republic) Tomáš Kostka	All
(San Marino) Audi Sport Italia	Audi RS5	02	(Italy) Davide Stancheris	1–3
(San Marino) Audi Sport Italia	Audi RS5	02	(San Marino) Emanuele Zonzini	4–6
(San Marino) Audi Sport Italia	Audi RS5	03	(Italy) Ermanno Dionisio	2–6
(Italy) Team BMW Dinamic	BMW M3 (E92)	04	(Italy) Niccolò Mercatali	1–4
(Italy) Team BMW Dinamic	BMW M3 (E92)	05	(Italy) Max Mugelli	All
(Italy) Team BMW Dinamic	BMW M3 (E92)	19	(Italy) Maurizio Copetti	1–4
(Italy) Team BMW Dinamic	BMW M3 (E92)	19	(Italy) Francesca Linossi	5
(Italy) Team BMW Dinamic	BMW M3 (E92)	19	(Italy) Niccolò Mercatali	6
(Italy) Team BMW Dinamic	BMW M3 (E92)	47	(Italy) Gianpiero Pindari	6
(Italy) Scuderia Giudici	BMW M3 (E92)	06	(Italy) Jonathan Giacon	1, 3
(Italy) Scuderia Giudici	BMW M3 (E92)	09	(Italy) Gianni Giudici	1, 3
(Italy) Scuderia Giudici	BMW M3 (E92)	47	(Italy) Domiziano Giacon	2–3
(Italy) Scuderia Giudici	BMW 550i (E60)	64	(Italy) Gabriele Volpato	1
(Italy) Tecnodom	BMW M3 (E92)	06	(Italy) Jonathan Giacon	5
(Italy) Tecnodom	BMW M3 (E92)	47	(Italy) Domiziano Giacon	5
(Italy) Tecnodom	Audi RS4	48	(Italy) Kevin Giacon	5
(Italy) Tecnodom	Audi RS4	49	(Italy) Silvano Bolzoni	5
(Italy) Team MRT	Chrysler 300C SRT-8	07	(Italy) Alessandro Battaglin	1
(Italy) Team MRT	Chrysler 300C SRT-8	07	(Italy) Kevin Giacon	3
(Italy) Team MRT	Lexus IS-F 500	46	(Italy) Giovanni Lavaggi	1–2, 4
(Italy) Todi Corse	BMW M3 (E90)	08	(Italy) Francesco Ascani	2
(Italy) Solaris Motorsport	Chevrolet Lumina CR8	11	(Italy) Domenico Schiattarella	1, 3
(Italy) Solaris Motorsport	Chevrolet Lumina CR8	11	(Italy) Giovanni Berton	5–6
(Italy) Solaris Motorsport	Chevrolet Camaro SS	12	(Italy) Francesco Sini	All
(Denmark) Hartmann Racing	Mercedes C63 AMG	14	(Italy) Giuseppe Cipriani	1
(Denmark) Hartmann Racing	Mercedes C63 AMG	15	(Denmark) Hans Hartmann	1
(Italy) Roma Racing Team	Mercedes C63 AMG Coupé	27	(Italy) Eddie Cheever III	1
(Italy) Roma Racing Team	Mercedes C63 AMG Coupé	27	(Italy) Nicola Baldan	2–6
(Italy) Roma Racing Team	Mercedes C63 AMG	28	(Italy) Nicola Baldan	1
(Italy) Roma Racing Team	Mercedes C63 AMG	28	(Italy) Nico Caldarola	3–6
(Italy) CAAL Racing	Mercedes C63 AMG	54	(Italy) Diego Romanini	1–4, 6
(Italy) CAAL Racing	Mercedes C63 AMG	58	(Italy) Leonardo Baccarelli	1–3, 6
(Italy) CAAL Racing	Mercedes C63 AMG	58	(Italy) Gianpiero Pindari	4

== Race calendar and results ==
The championship will be contested over ten races to be held at six circuits in Italy, the Czech Republic and Germany.

Round		Circuit	Date	Pole position	Fastest lap	Winning driver	Winning team
1	R1	(Italy) Autodromo Nazionale Monza	6 April	(Italy) Eddie Cheever III	(Italy) Eddie Cheever III	(Italy) Eddie Cheever III	(Italy) Roma Racing Team
1	R2	(Italy) Autodromo Nazionale Monza	6 April		(Italy) Eddie Cheever III	(Italy) Eddie Cheever III	(Italy) Roma Racing Team
2	R1	(Italy) ACI Vallelunga Circuit	4 May	(Czech Republic) Tomáš Kostka	(Czech Republic) Tomáš Kostka	(Italy) Francesco Sini	(Italy) Solaris Motorsport
2	R2	(Italy) ACI Vallelunga Circuit	4 May		(Italy) Davide Stancheris	(Czech Republic) Tomáš Kostka	(San Marino) Audi Sport Italia
3	R1	(Italy) Mugello Circuit	18 May	(Italy) Max Mugelli	(Italy) Davide Stancheris	(Italy) Nicola Baldan	(Italy) Roma Racing Team
3	R2	(Italy) Mugello Circuit	18 May		(Italy) Nicola Baldan	(Italy) Niccolò Mercatali	(Italy) Team BMW Dinamic
4	R1	(Czech Republic) Brno Circuit	22 June	(Czech Republic) Tomáš Kostka	(Czech Republic) Tomáš Kostka	(Czech Republic) Tomáš Kostka	(San Marino) Audi Sport Italia
4	R2	(Czech Republic) Brno Circuit	22 June		(Czech Republic) Tomáš Kostka	(Italy) Francesco Sini	(Italy) Solaris Motorsport
5		(Germany) Sachsenring	21 September	(Czech Republic) Tomáš Kostka	(Czech Republic) Tomáš Kostka	(Czech Republic) Tomáš Kostka	(San Marino) Audi Sport Italia
6		(Germany) Hockenheimring	5 October	(Czech Republic) Tomáš Kostka	(Italy) Francesco Sini	(Italy) Francesco Sini	(Italy) Solaris Motorsport

== Championship standings ==
=== Drivers' Championship ===
Scoring system

Event format	Position, points per race																	
Event format	**1st**	**2nd**	**3rd**	**4th**	**5th**	**6th**	**7th**	**8th**	**9th**	**10th**	**11th**	**12th**	**13th**	**14th**	**15th**	**Pole**	**FL**	**Start**
Single-race	32	25	21	18	16	14	12	10	8	7	6	5	4	3	2	1	1	1
Two-race	24	19	16	14	12	10	9	8	7	6	5	4	3	2	1	1	1	1

Pos	Driver	MNZ (Italy)		VAL (Italy)		MUG (Italy)		BRN (Czech Republic)		SAC (Germany)	HOC (Germany)	Pts
1	(Italy) Francesco Sini	5	2	1	6	Ret	Ret	2	1	4	1	169
2	(Czech Republic) Tomáš Kostka	4	4	**10**	1	6	8	**1**	Ret	**1**	**4**	168
3	(Italy) Nicola Baldan	2	16†	2	8†	1	2	3	2	7	Ret	147
4	(Italy) Niccolò Mercatali	9	10	3	4	7	1	6	4		Ret	109
5	(Italy) Max Mugelli	6	5	Ret	DNS	**2**	4	5	3	6	Ret	107
6	(Italy) Maurizio Copetti	8	8	4	9	5	7	4	5			92
7	(Italy) Ermanno Dionisio			7	3	11	5	7	8	3	Ret	88
8	(Italy) Diego Romanini	13†	9	6	Ret	4	Ret	8	6		3	82
9	(Italy) Davide Stancheris	7	7	5	2	12†	6					71
10	(Italy) Domenico Schiattarella	3	3			3	3					68
11	(Italy) Eddie Cheever III	**1**	1									53
12	(Italy) Leonardo Baccarelli	10	12	8	Ret	8	Ret				5	49
13	(Italy) Giovanni Berton									5	2	43
14	(Italy) Domiziano Giacon			11	7	10	9			12		37
15	(San Marino) Emanuele Zonzini							Ret	DNS	2	Ret	28
16	(Italy) Francesco Ascani			9	5							21
17	(Italy) Giovanni Lavaggi	Ret	15†	DNS	DNS			9	7			21
18	(Italy) Jonathan Giacon	Ret	11			Ret	Ret			8		20
19	(Italy) Giampiero Pindari							Ret	Ret		6†	17
20	(Italy) Giuseppe Cipriani	Ret	6									12
21	(Italy) Alessandro Battaglin	11	14									9
22	(Denmark) Hans Hartmann	12	13									9
23	(Italy) Gianni Giudici	Ret	DNS			9	DNS					9
24	(Italy) Silvano Bolzoni									9		9
25	(Italy) Francesca Linossi									10		8
26	(Italy) Kevin Giacon					Ret	DNS			11		8
27	(Italy) Nico Caldarola					Ret	Ret	Ret	Ret	Ret	Ret	5
28	(Italy) Gabriele Volpato	Ret	17†									2
Pos	Driver	MNZ (Italy)		VAL (Italy)		MUG (Italy)		BRN (Czech Republic)		SAC (Germany)	HOC (Germany)	Pts

Colour	Result
Gold	Winner
Silver	Second place
Bronze	Third place
Green	Points classification
Blue	Non-points classification
Blue	Non-classified finish (NC)
Purple	Retired, not classified (Ret)
Red	Did not qualify (DNQ)
Red	Did not pre-qualify (DNPQ)
Black	Disqualified (DSQ)
White	Did not start (DNS)
White	Withdrew (WD)
White	Race cancelled (C)
Blank	Did not practice (DNP)
Blank	Did not arrive (DNA)
Blank	Excluded (EX)

**Bold** – Pole
Italics – Fastest Lap

† – Drivers did not finish the race, but were classified as they completed over 50% of the race distance.

=== Teams' championship ===
Pos	Team	Manufacturer	Points
1	(San Marino) Audi Sport Italia	Audi	290
2	(Italy) Solaris Motorsport	Chevrolet	280
3	(Italy) Team BMW Dinamic	BMW	270
4	(Italy) Roma Racing Team	Mercedes-Benz	207
5	(Italy) CAAL Racing	Mercedes-Benz	133
6	(Italy) Scuderia Giudici	BMW	49
7	(Italy) Team MRT	Chevrolet / Lexus	31
8	(Denmark) Hartmann Racing	Mercedes-Benz	21
9	(Italy) Todi Corse	BMW	21
10	(Italy) Tecnodom	BMW / Audi	20
