= Audi RS 6 =

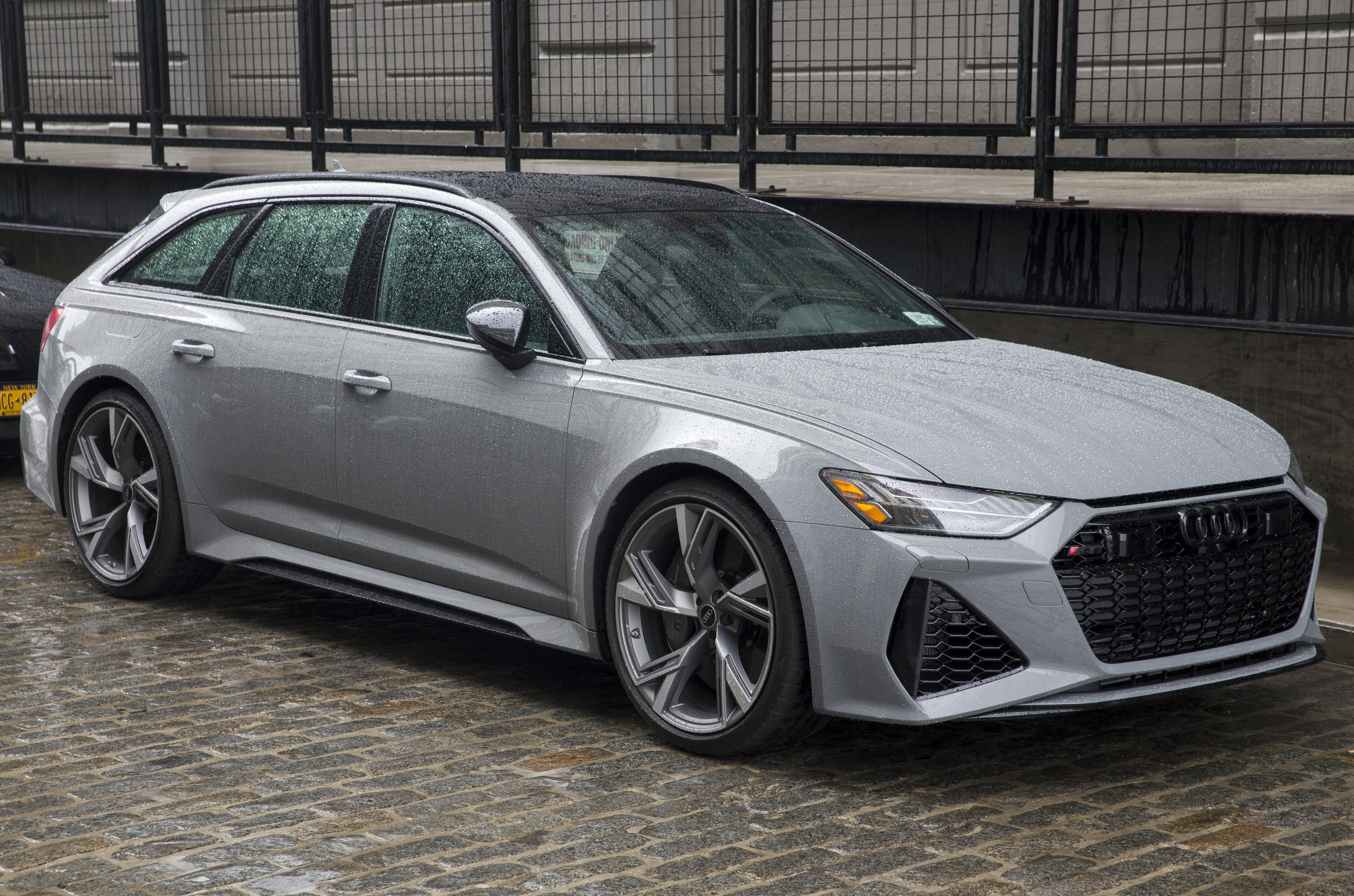
- 2021 Audi RS 6 Avant

Overview
- Manufacturer: Audi Sport GmbH, for Audi AG
- Production: 2002–2004; 2008–2010; 2013–2018; 2019–2025
- Assembly: Germany: Neckarsulm

Body and chassis
- Class: Executive car (E)
- Layout: Front-engine, all-wheel-drive (quattro)
- Platform: MLBevo series
- Related: Audi A6; Audi S6

Powertrain
- Transmission: Tiptronic automatic

The Audi RS 6 is a high-performance variant of the Audi A6 range, produced by the high-performance subsidiary company Audi Sport GmbH, for its parent company Audi AG, a subsidiary of the Volkswagen Group, from 2002 onwards.

The first and second versions of the RS 6 were offered in both Avant and saloon forms. The third and fourth generations are only offered as an Avant.

== Overview ==
The "RS" initials are taken from the German: RennSport – literally translated as "racing sport", and is Audi's ultimate 'top-tier' high-performance trim level, positioned a noticeable step above the "S" model specification level of Audi's regular model range line-up. Like all Audi "RS" models, the RS 6 pioneers some of Audi's newest and most advanced engineering and technology, and so could be described as a halo vehicle, with the latest RS 6 Performance having the most powerful internal combustion engine out of all Audi models, with the same power and torque as the physically larger Audi S8 Plus. Unlike the A6 and S6, however, the RS 6's engines in the C5 and C6 iterations have not been shared with any other vehicle in Audi's lineup. However, for the C7 generation, the Audi RS 6 has the same 4.0 L bi-turbo V8 engine as the Audi RS 7, with both being positioned at the top of the Audi S and RS range, detuned variants of the same engines are found in the Audi S8, Audi A8, and Audi S6.

Based on the A6 platform, the RS 6's engines are front-mounted and longitudinally oriented, while the transmission is mounted immediately at the rear of the engine in a longitudinal orientation, in the form of a transaxle. Like all S and RS models, the RS 6 is only available with Audi's 'trademark' Torsen-based quattro permanent four-wheel drive system.

The C5 RS 6 was the fourth model to come out of Audi's private subsidiary company, "quattro GmbH". The first was the Audi RS 2 Avant, from a joint venture between Porsche and Quattro GmbH for the Audi marque. The second was the Audi C4 S6 Plus, produced from April 1996 to July 1997. The third was the 2000 Audi B5 RS 4; the fifth was the 2005 Audi B7 A4 DTM Edition saloon, and the sixth was the 2006 Audi B7 RS 4. The seventh and current (as of January 2010) Quattro GmbH model is the latest Audi C6 RS 6.

Production of the original Audi C5 RS 6 began in June 2002 and ended in September 2004. The second Audi C6 RS 6 was introduced at the 2007 Frankfurt Motor Show. The original RS 6 (C5) was the first Audi RS variant exported to North America, while the C6 and C7 RS 6 were only sold in Europe, with the C8 RS 6 again being offering in North America.

Main rivals for the Audi RS 6 are the BMW M5 and Mercedes-Benz E 55/E 63 AMG.

== C5 (Typ 4B, 2002–2004) ==
First generation (C5/4B)
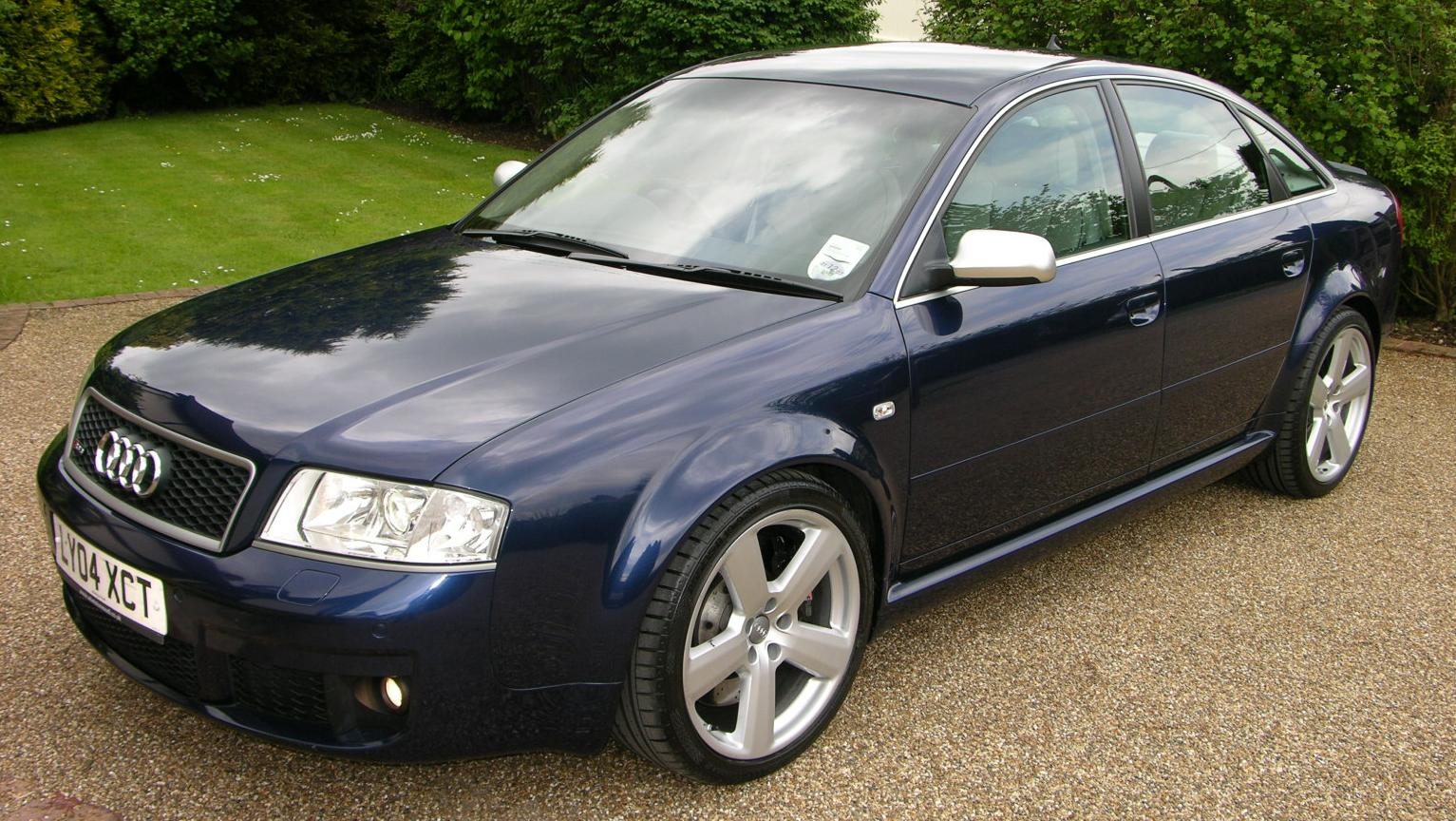

Overview
- Production: July 2002 – September 2004

Body and chassis
- Body style: 5-door Avant (estate/wagon), 4-door saloon/sedan
- Platform: Volkswagen Group C5
- Related: Audi C5 A6, Audi C5 S6

Powertrain
- Engine: Petrol: 4.2 V8 biturbo
- Transmission: 5-speed ZF 5HP24A tiptronic automatic

Dimensions
- Wheelbase: 2,759 mm (108.6 in)
- Length: 4,852 mm (191.0 in)
- Width: 1,850 mm (72.8 in)
- Height: Saloon: 1,387–1,426 mm (54.6–56.1 in), Avant: 1,390–1,430 mm (54.7–56.3 in)
- Kerb weight: Saloon: 1,840 kg (4,057 lb), Avant: 1,865 kg (4,112 lb)

Chronology
- Successor: C6 RS 6 (Typ 4F)

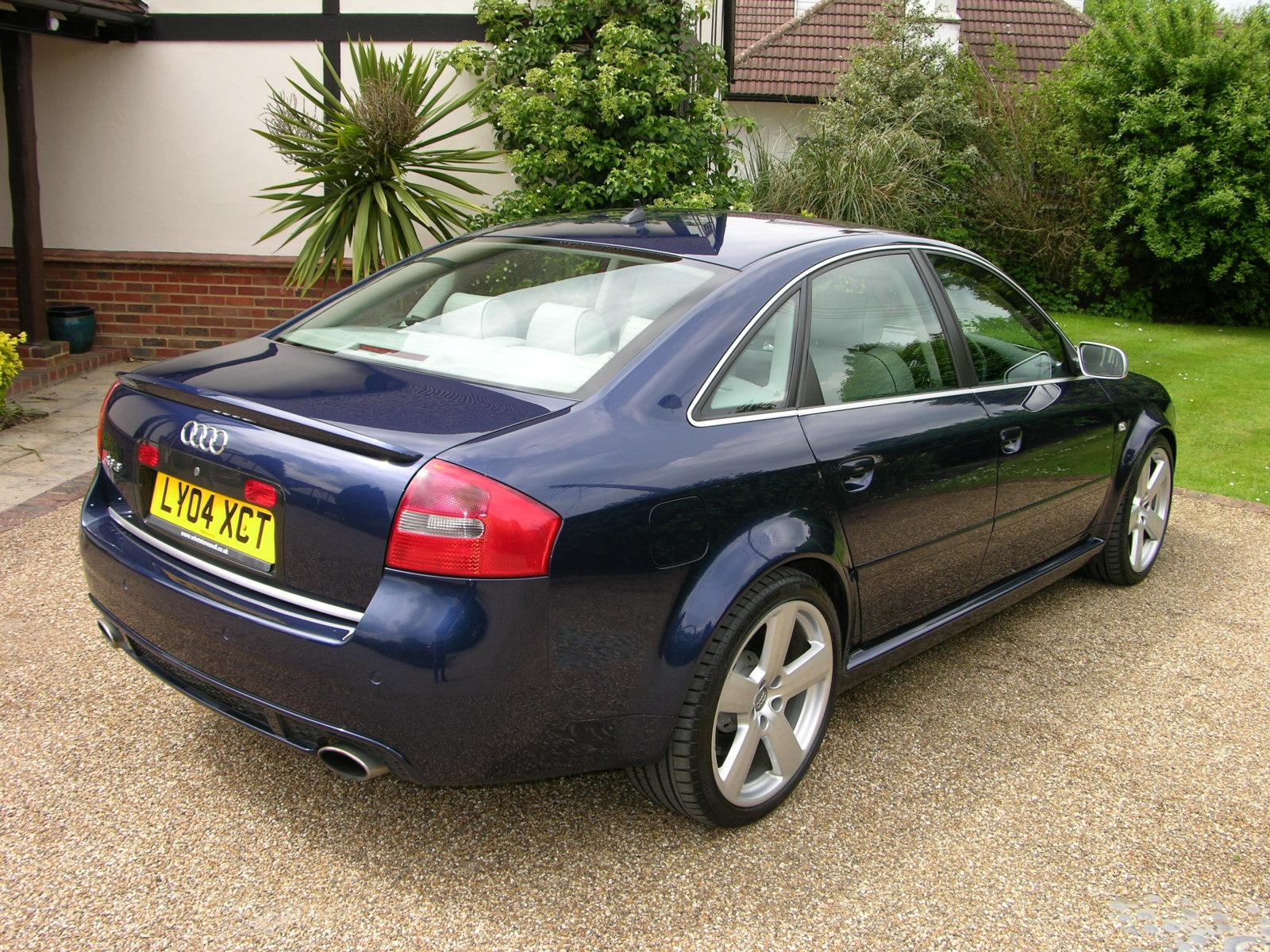
Audi C5 RS 6 quattro saloon

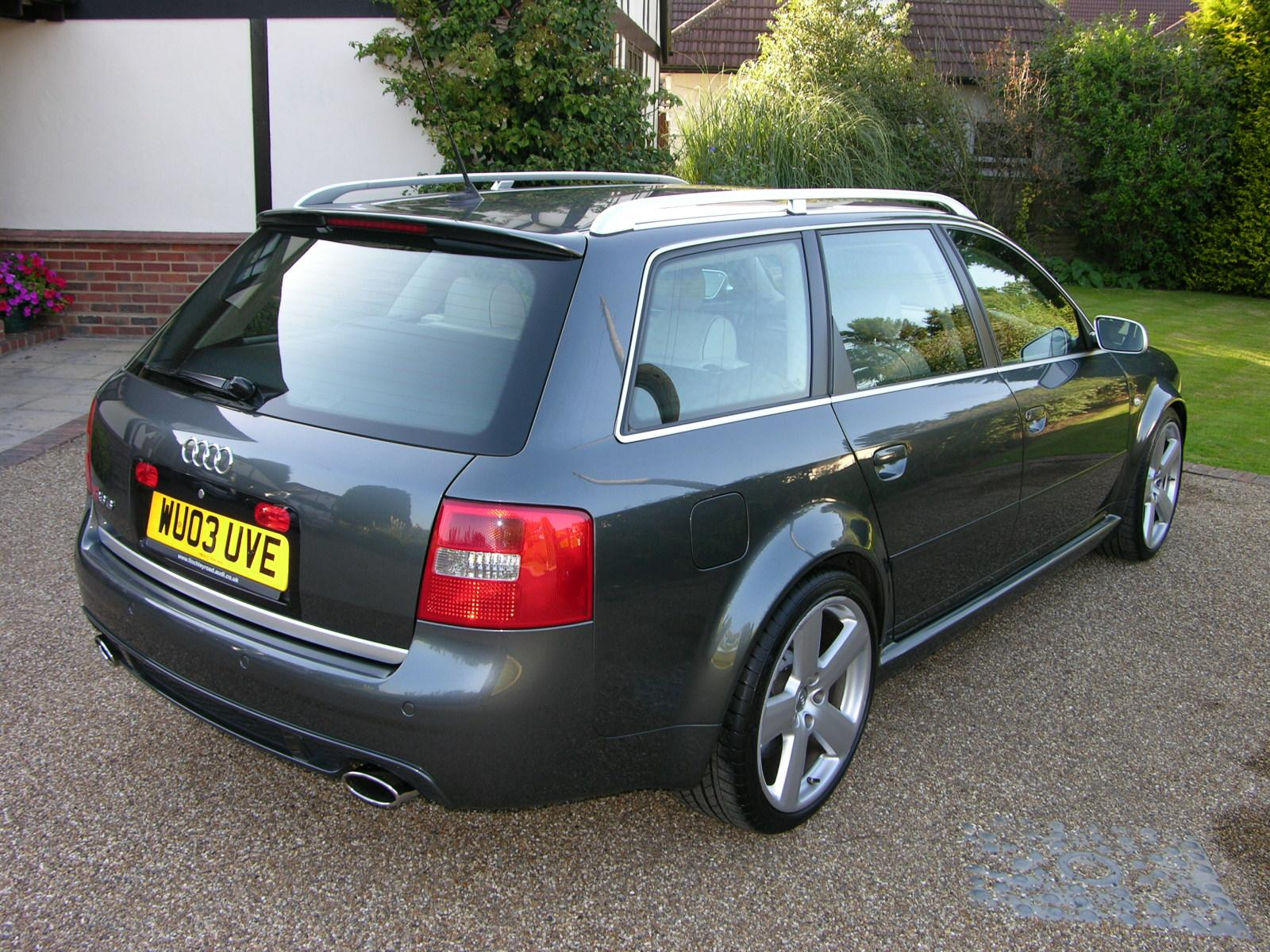
Audi C5 RS 6 quattro Avant

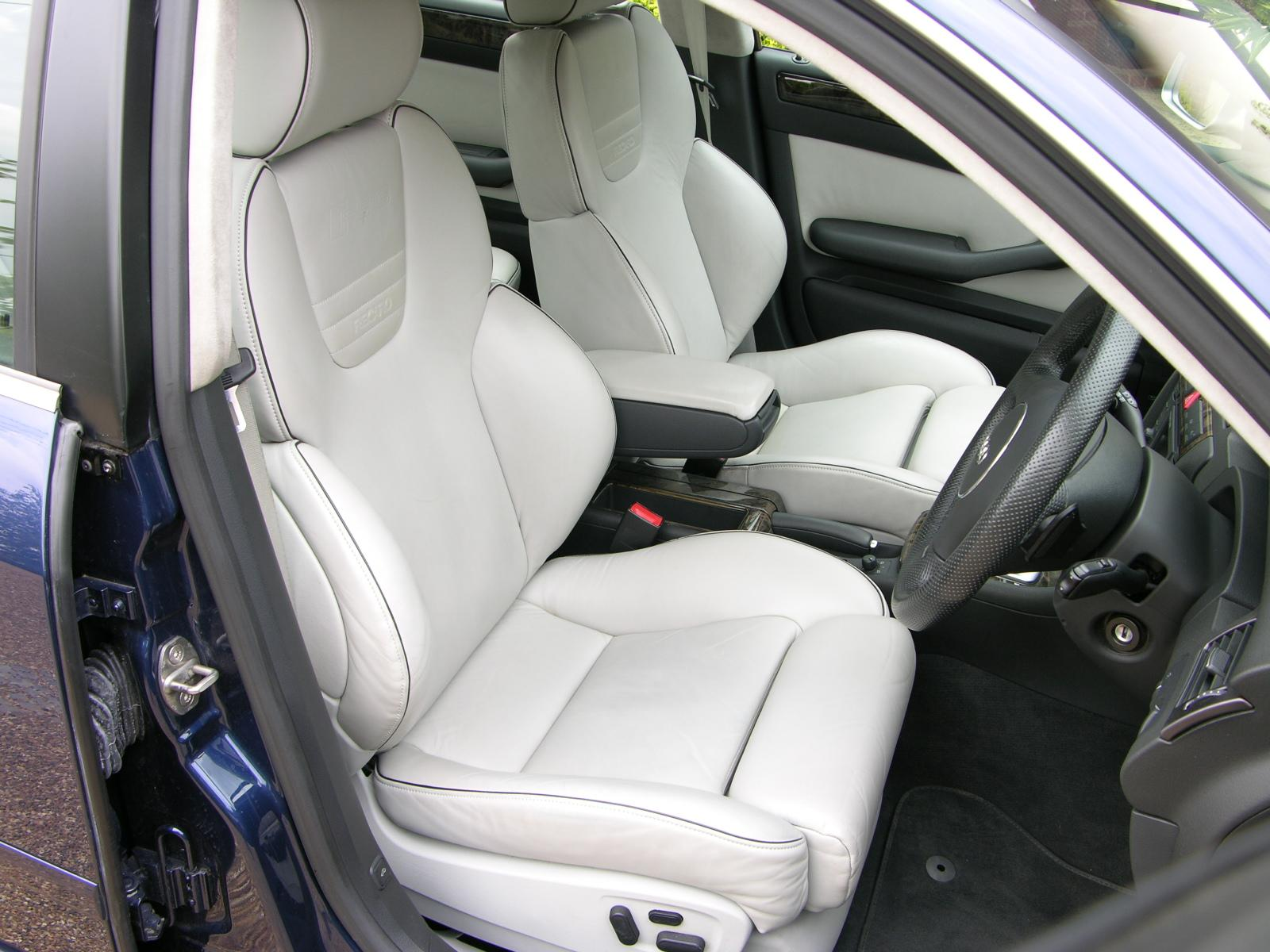
RS6 interior, showing leather-clad Recaro seats

The original Audi C5 RS 6 Quattro (Typ 4B) was the top-of-the-line user of the Volkswagen Group C5 platform (1997–2004), and was initially available as a five-door five-seat Avant - Audi's name for an estate or station wagon. A four-door five-seat saloon/sedan followed shortly after the launch of the Avant. Derived from the Audi C5 S6 (itself derived from the Audi C5 A6), the RS 6 also shares the aluminium structure from the firewall and forward with the C5 A6s with V8 engines (A6 4.2 V8 Quattro, S6 saloon/Avant). It was manufactured from July 2002 through to September 2004.

Official performance figures for the Avant, whilst consuming the recommended high octane 98 RON "Super Plus" unleaded petrol indicate the 0-100 kilometres per hour (62.1 mph) dash would be completed in 4.6 seconds (s), reaching 200 km/h (124.3 mph) in 17.8 seconds (17.6 s for the saloon). Official figures state an electronically limited top speed of 250 km/h (155.3 mph), although most "RS" owners report that the speed limiter is rather liberal on all RS cars, with genuine 'limited' top speeds of 270 km/h (167.8 mph) being possible to achieve. Using a lower octane-rated petrol, such as the standard 95 RON "Premium" unleaded will reduce the engine power output, and have logical reduction in performance.

Luggage capacity, measured according to the VDA block method in the Avant ranges from 455 litres (16.07 cu ft), to 1,590 litres (56.15 cu ft) with the rear seats folded down. For the saloon, the boot holds 424 litres (14.97 cu ft).

=== C5 powertrain ===
For the C5 RS 6 powertrain detail, the engine is an all-aluminium alloy 4,172 cubic centimetres (254.6 cu in) twin-turbocharged ('biturbo'), double overhead camshaft, 5 valve per cylinder version of Audi's 4.2-litre 90° V8 petrol engine (parts code prefix: 077, identification code: BCY), developed and manufactured in Germany and the UK by quattro GmbH and Cosworth Technology (now known as MAHLE Powertrain). With the addition of the two turbochargers (one per cylinder bank), the power output of the V8 engine increased to 331 kW (450 PS; 444 bhp) at 5,700 to 6,400 rpm, and 560 N⋅m (413 lbf⋅ft) of torque. The combination of the 4.2-litre V8, variable inlet valve timing, and twin turbochargers give the RS 6 an exceptionally wide power band, with peak torque available from 1,950 to 5,600 rpm.

Further detail includes fully sequential electronic multi-point fuel injection with intake manifold fuel injectors, mapped direct ignition system with solid-state high voltage distribution using eight individual single-spark ignition coils and NGK longlife spark plugs, and three knock sensors. Engine management uses a Bosch Motronic ME 7.1.1 engine control unit, which controls all functions of the engine operation; including fuel delivery, ignition system, valve timing, emissions control systems, and torque reduction control—the latter operating in conjunction with the Bosch ESP 5.7 Electronic Stability Programme, as part of the "Anti Slip Regulation" (ASR) traction control system. The engine is compliant with the European Union Euro3 (EU3) standard, and includes two close-coupled primary catalytic converters (CATs), two underfloor main CATs, and four heated oxygen sensors which manage the cylinder bank selective lambda control. This results in a CO_{2} emissions rating of 350 g/km for the Avant and saloon in standard configuration.

It has an electronically controlled five-speed ZF 5HP24A tiptronic automatic transmission (parts code prefix: 01L, identification code: GAG) (gear ratios—1st: 3.571, 2nd: 2.200, 3rd: 1.505, 4th: 1.000, 5th: 0.804), with lock-up torque converter in all forward gears. It has "hill-detection" capability, and despite many press articles stating that the gearbox was programmed to "blip" the throttle for downshifting gear changes, no UK owners have ever found this feature to be present. The transmission control unit ECU incorporates "fuzzy logic" with its "Dynamic Shift Programme" (DSP), with the shift pattern adapting to suit individual driving styles. 'Tiptronic' manual control can be achieved with either the floor-mounted gear shift lever or the steering wheel-mounted 'paddles'.

The RS 6 was only available with Audi's Torsen-based Quattro permanent four-wheel drive, utilising the Torsen T-2 dynamic 'automatic torque biasing' (ATB) centre differential (diff), a modified unit which was being used in the 6.0-litre W12-powered Audi D3 A8. The torque from the engine is first routed from the gearbox output shaft to the Torsen centre diff, and then automatically divided and apportioned between the front and rear axles.

The front and rear axle differentials (ratio: 3.197, rear axle identification code: GGW) are a conventional "open" type but utilise an "Electronic Differential Lock" (EDL). EDL is an integrated additional function of the Bosch Electronic Stability Programme (ESP) system, and works by monitoring and comparing the individual wheel speeds across an axle, and braking an individual wheel which is sensed to have lost traction (spinning), thus transferring torque across the axle to the wheel/tyre which does have grip. "Anti-Slip Regulation" (ASR), more commonly known as traction control system completes the Bosch ESP-related driver aids.

=== C5 suspension and steering ===
Utilising the same fully independent four-link front suspension, and double wishbone rear, as its related A6 and S6, the RS 6 was lowered by 20 millimetres (0.79 in), with a 30% stiffer spring rate, and 40% increased compression damping. The RS6 also served as the debut model for Audi's "Dynamic Ride Control" (DRC) system. The DRC system is mainly mechanical, and uses a pump to provide additional pressure to individual dampers (shock absorbers) during cornering, acceleration or braking; to counteract rolling and pitching. The system can adjust the stiffness at each individual damper constantly; to maintain both a comfortable ride on straight roads, and a high level of poise and grip when cornering hard, accelerating, or braking. The DRC's main advantage is that it operates without the need for complicated electronics, as required in similar systems from Mercedes-Benz and other competitors. Its main drawback is that the DRC dampers have been known to fail (leaking fluid from the cross-linked circuits), which can affect the handling and ride quality of the vehicle; some owners have reported needing multiple replacements of faulty DRC units and many drivers have opted to replace the system with simpler and more reliable aftermarket coil-over suspension.

=== C5 brakes, wheels and tyres ===
The front brakes feature fixed Brembo 8-piston monoblock brake calipers, working with radially vented and cross-drilled brake discs, sized at 365 millimetres (14.4 in) in diameter, by 34 mm (1.34 in) thick. The rear features single-piston floating ATE calipers with integrated cable-operated parking brake mechanism, mated to radially vented disc and cross-drilled, sized 335 mm (13.2 in) by 22 mm (0.87 in). Front and rear brake calipers are finished in a high-gloss black paint, with the fronts incorporating the Audi "RS" logo. Both front and rear discs are held in by metal pins to the lightweight disc hub, and allow 1.0 mm (0.039 in) of lateral thermal expansion from the hub centre.

Bosch ESP 5.7 Electronic Stability Programme, with Anti-lock Braking System (ABS), Electronic Brakeforce Distribution (EBD), and Brake Assist (BA) was standard fitment.

There were a total of three original equipment manufacturer (OEM) wheel and tyre types available with the RS 6. In Europe and elsewhere, 19-inch wheels were standard, with an optional 18-inch package. In the U.S. market, the 18-inch package was the only available offering. An 18-inch winter package, with Dunlop SP Winter Sport M3 tyres (225/45 ZR18 95V) was universally available.

=== C5 RS 6 Plus ===
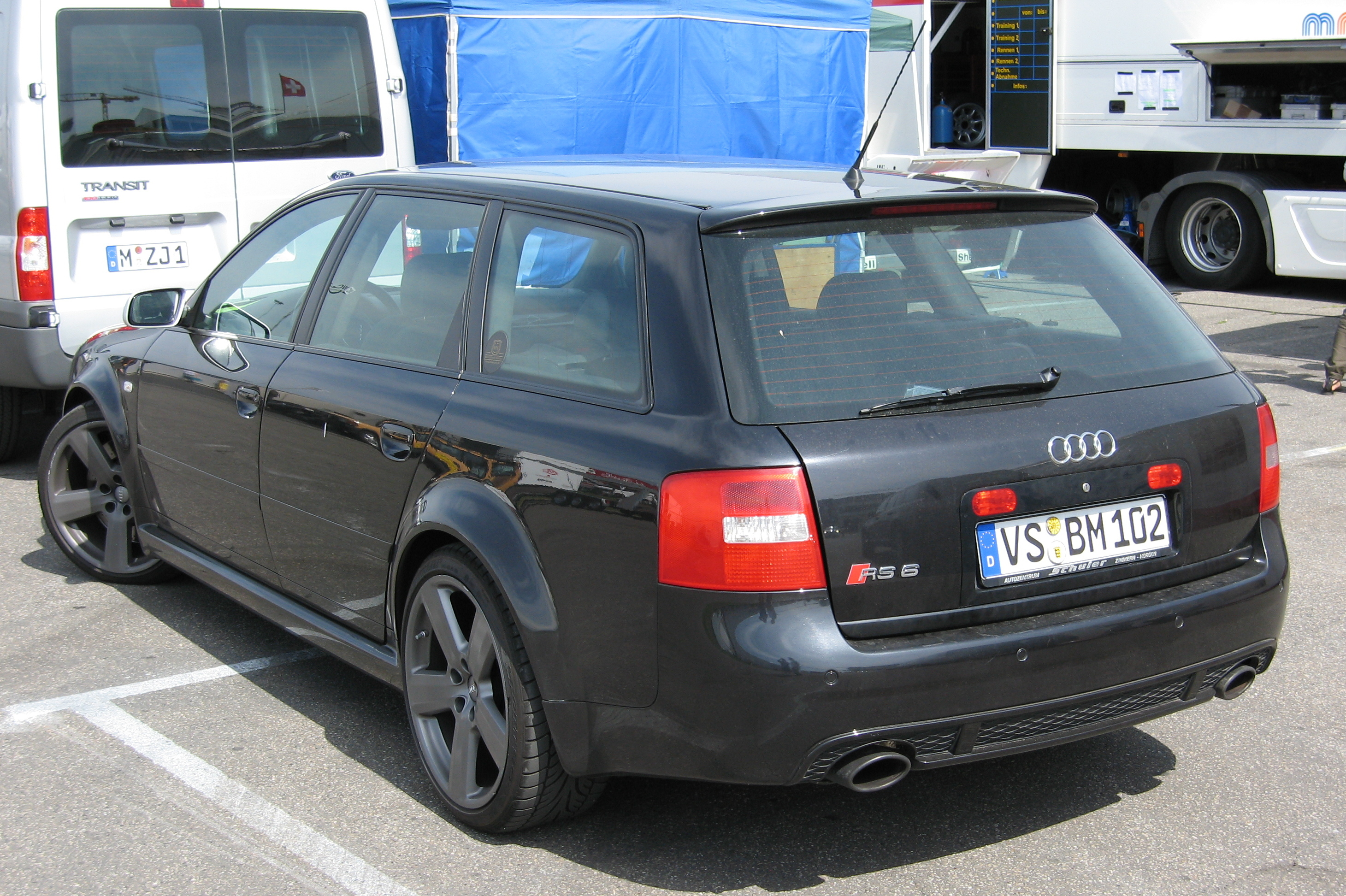
Audi RS6 Plus, showing the 'black optics' and anthracite alloy wheels

Between April 2004 and September 2004, there was a final limited run of an even higher-performance RS 6, named the Audi RS 6 Plus. This had an increased engine power output (identification code: BRV), and produced 353 kW (480 PS; 473 bhp) at 6,000-6,400 rpm, with the same 580 N⋅m (428 lb⋅ft) of torque at 1,950-6,000 rpm. This engine was also developed and manufactured in the UK by Cosworth Technology (now known as MAHLE Powertrain). The additional performance was achieved with a new engine control unit (ECU), and two additional coolant radiators behind the side-mounted intercoolers (these were standard fitment on the standard RS 6 in hotter climate countries). Official performance figures indicate the discipline of sprinting from standstill to 100 km/h (62.1 mph) in 4.4 seconds. The RS 6 Plus carries on to reach 200 km/h (124.3 mph) in 20.36 seconds, and has an official top speed of 280 km/h (174.0 mph).

The RS 6 Plus came with Dynamic Ride Control (DRC) as standard, and also included a no-cost option of "Sports Suspension Plus", which lowered the standard sports suspension by a further 10 millimetres (0.39 in) over the standard RS 6. A revised steering rack, with a reduced ratio of 14.3 for firmer steering feel was included, and resulted in a turning circle of 11.7 metres (38.4 ft). The brakes now included cross-drilled discs. The wheels were only available in the 9Jx19-inch '5-arm design' alloys, finished in "anthracite" (dark grey), with 255/35 ZR19 96Y XL tyres.

The car was available only as an Avant and was sold only in European markets. Visual differences for the RS 6 Plus included the "black optic pack", which consisted of black finish to the framing of the radiator grille, exterior window trims, tailgate lower trim, roof rails, and exhaust tailpipes. It quickly sold out once it was released (999 units total). The last three digits of the Vehicle Identification Number (VIN) are reproduced on a plaque inside the car, displayed on the centre console.

=== C5 RS 6 in auto racing ===
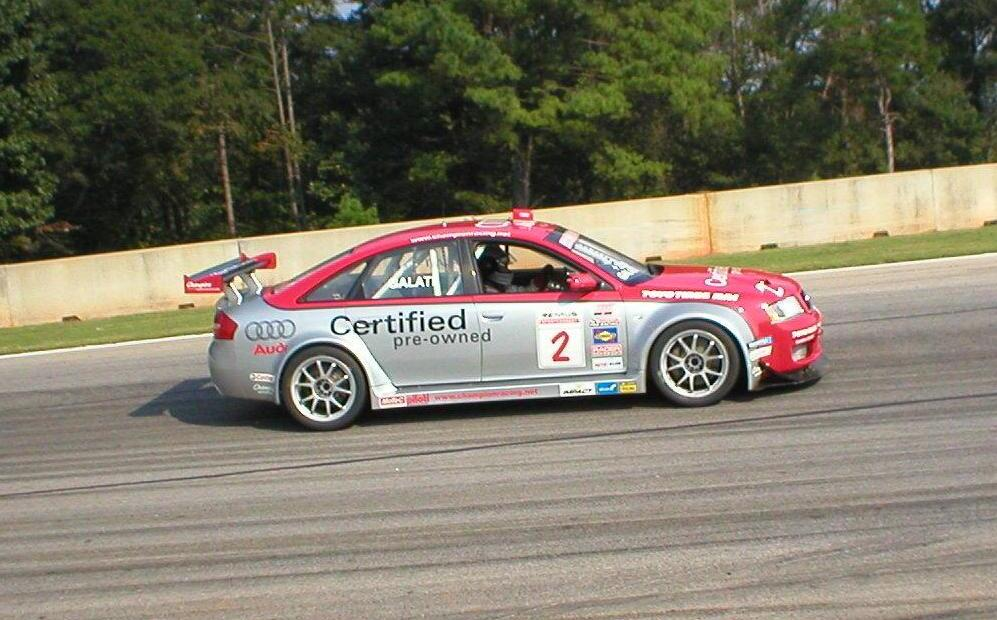
Champion Racing Audi RS6 Competition

The RS 6 was used in the North American SPEED World Challenge GT Series of auto racing for three years - 2002 to 2004, claiming the manufacturers' championship victory successively in all three years. Once again, the special race derivative of the twin-turbo V8 engine was developed and manufactured in the UK by Cosworth Technology (now known as MAHLE Powertrain). However, the 2005 season proved difficult due to performance restrictions imposed on Champion Audi Racing by the Sports Car Club of America (SCCA), with Champion deciding to run a different wheel diameter, and the trade-off was reducing boost pressure.

The RS 6 was challenged by a factory-backed Cadillac CTS-V but was still victorious. Champion Audi Racing decided to pull the RS 6 from the series, citing unfair rules and regulations that targeted the dominant Audis.

== C6 (Typ 4F, 2008–2010) ==
Second generation (C6/4F)
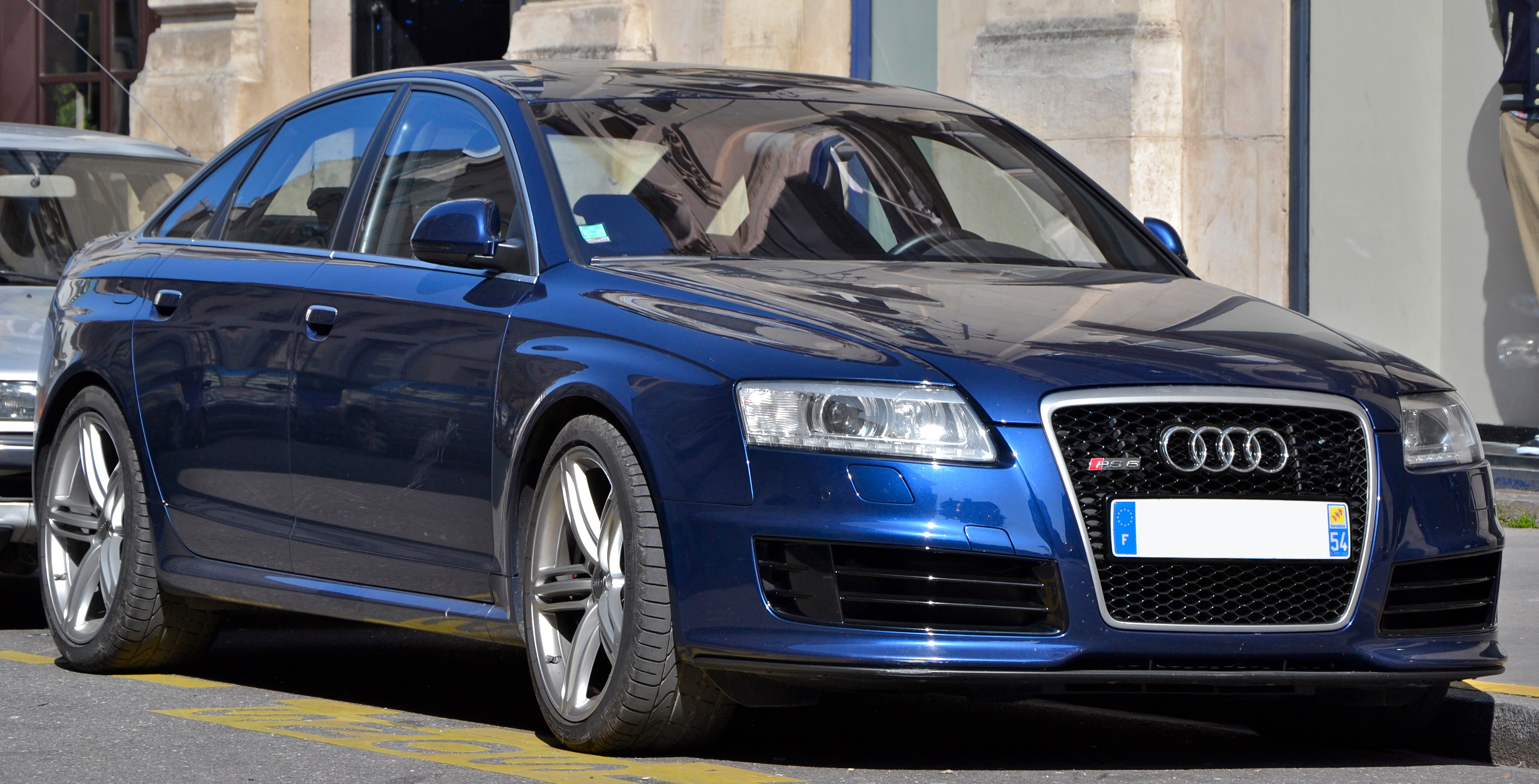

Overview
- Production: 2007–2011

Body and chassis
- Body style: 5-door Avant (estate/wagon), 4-door saloon/sedan
- Platform: Volkswagen Group C6
- Related: Audi C6 A6, Audi C6 S6

Powertrain
- Engine: 5.0 L even firing biturbo V10 TFSI DOHC (BUH)
- Transmission: 6-speed ZF 6HP 28A tiptronic automatic

Dimensions
- Wheelbase: 2,846 mm (112.0 in)
- Length: Avant: 4,923 mm (193.8 in), saloon: 4,928 mm (194.0 in)
- Width: 1,889 mm (74.4 in)
- Height: Avant: 1,460 mm (57.5 in), saloon: 1,456 mm (57.3 in)
- Kerb weight: 2,025 kg (4,464 lb)

Chronology
- Predecessor: C5 RS6 (Typ 4B)
- Successor: C7 RS6 (Typ 4G)

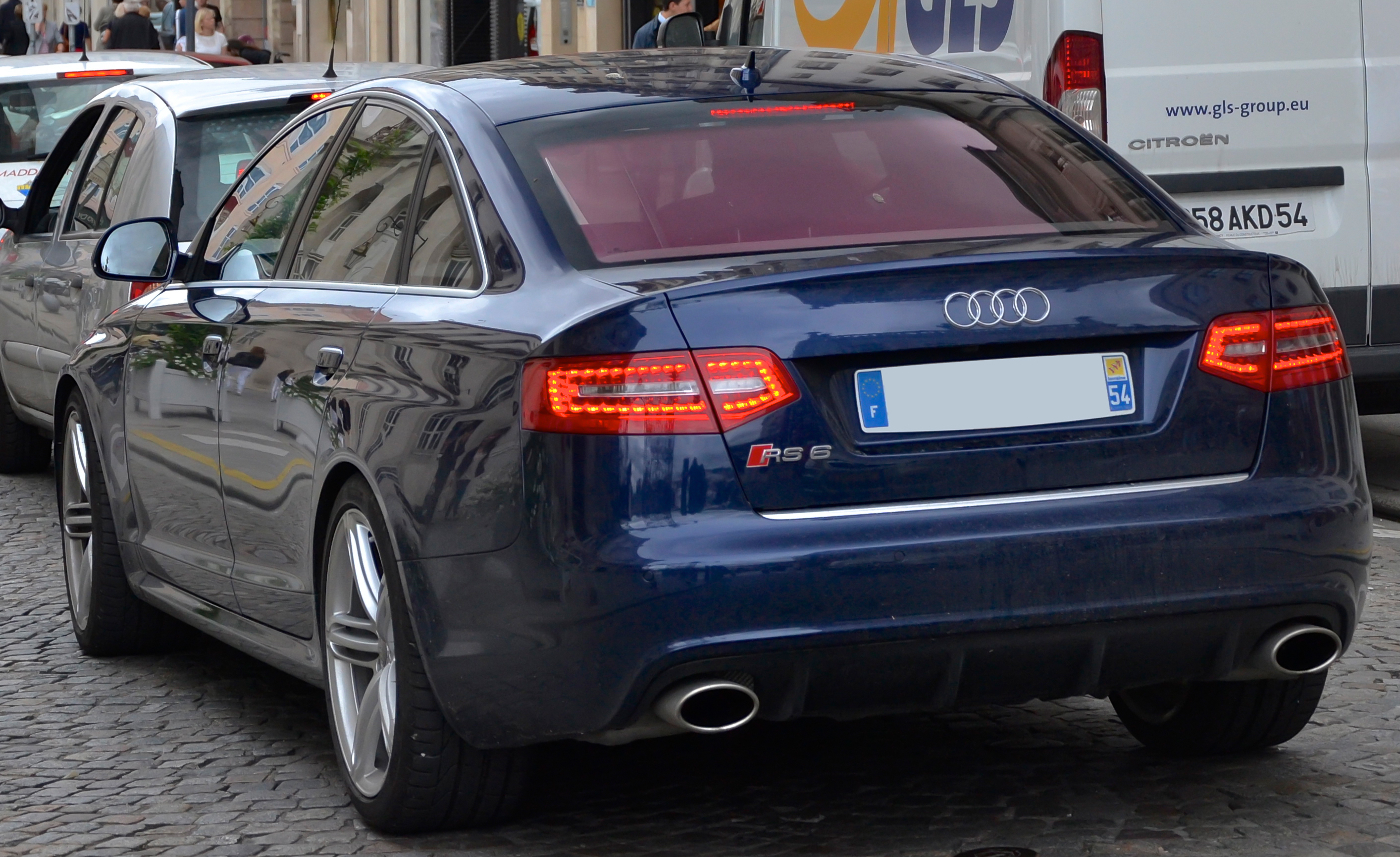
Audi RS6 saloon (France)

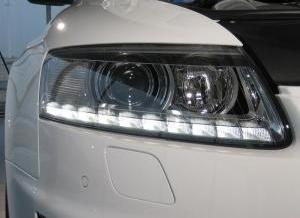
The ten (per side) LED daytime running lights (DRLs) - indicating a 10-cylinder engine

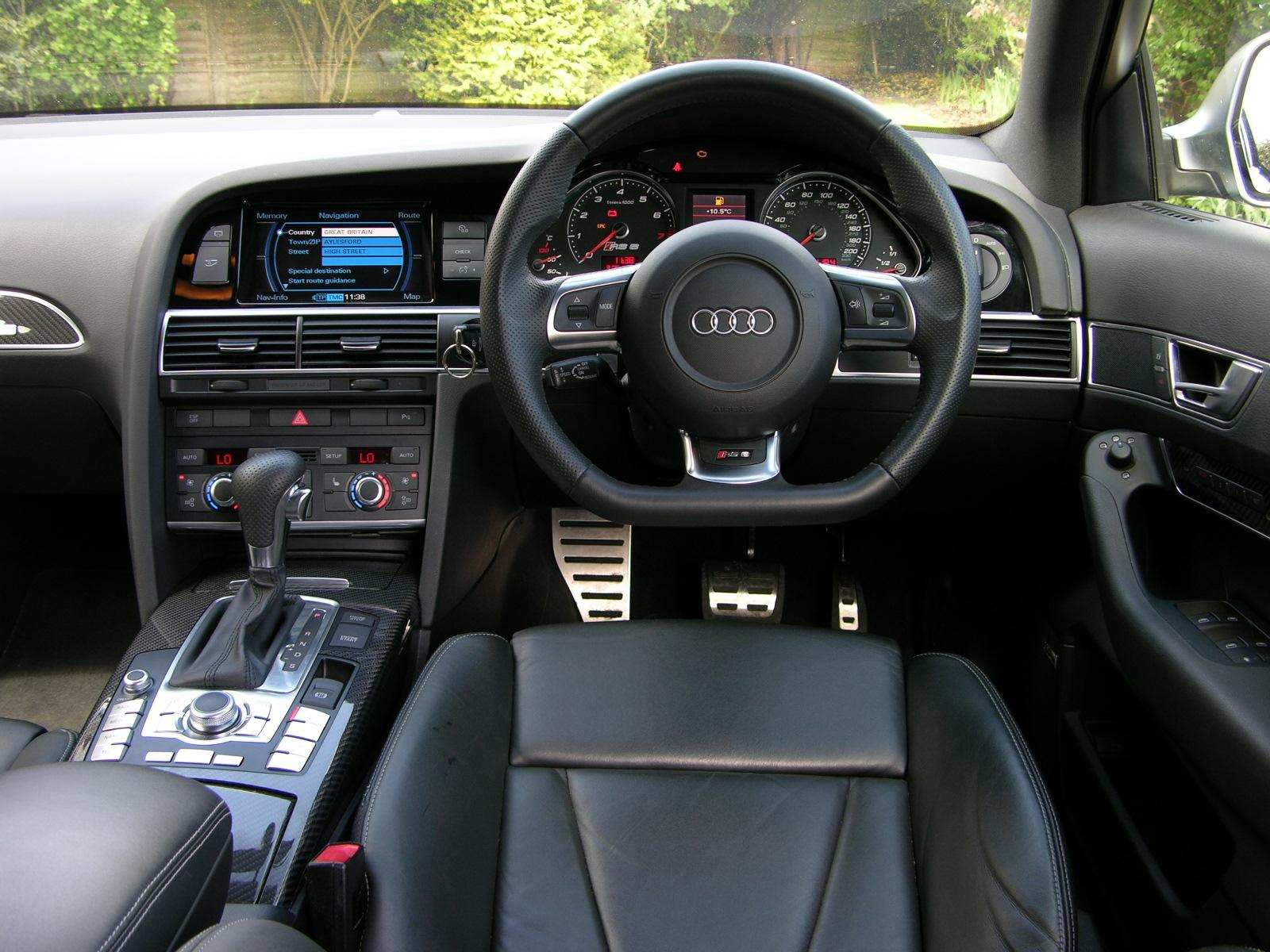
Interior

The second-generation RS 6, later called the Audi RS 6 5.0 TFSI quattro (Typ 4F) was based on the Volkswagen Group C6 automobile platform and was launched in September 2007 at the Frankfurt Motor Show. With factory production starting in December 2007, it was available in Europe from the same date, and began to be exported elsewhere in 2009. For the C6 RS 6, Audi planned to produce a total production run of 8000 cars, with 6500 of these being Avant's and the remainder saloons. The RS 6 was not available in North America, leaving the Audi S6 as the top performing trim there. (The unpopularity of wagons made it unlikely that the RS 6 Avant would be imported, and although it had been rumoured that the RS 6 sedan would be offered in the United States, nothing came of this as the RS 6 importer could not clear US regulations). Production of the C6 RS 6 ended in the third quarter of 2010.

The RS 6's 5.0 L (4,991 cc) V10 engine produced 426.5 kW (580 PS; 572 bhp) at 6,250 to 6,700 rpm and 650 N⋅m (479 lbf⋅ft) of torque from 1,500 to 6,250 rpm, 52 kW (71 PS; 70 bhp) and 150 N⋅m (111 lb⋅ft) more than BMW's 5.0L V10. As of January 2010, the RS6 was Audi's single most powerful car ever, and positioned the car ahead of its closest competitors, the BMW M5 and the Mercedes-Benz E63 AMG in terms of engine output, both of which have naturally aspirated engines. However the estimated price of the RS 6 sedan in 2010 was $160,000 USD (another source quotes $126,000 USD in 2009, making the RS 6 perhaps too expensive for the United States market) which set it apart from the performance variants of other executive cars: the MSRP of BMW M5's was $85,700 USD, of Mercedes-Benz E63 AMG's was $87,700 USD, and of Audi's own S6 was $78,025 USD.

Official performance figures for the Avant: 4.6 seconds for the 0-100 km/h (62.1 mph) sprint, 12.7 seconds 0-200 km/h (124.3 mph), and top speed is electronically limited to 250 km/h (155.3 mph), with a factory option to de-restrict the top speed to 274 km/h (170.3 mph). In standard form, CO_{2} emissions are rated at 333 g/km. The saloon reaches 0-100 km/h (62.1 mph) in 4.5 seconds.

=== C6 bodywork and styling ===
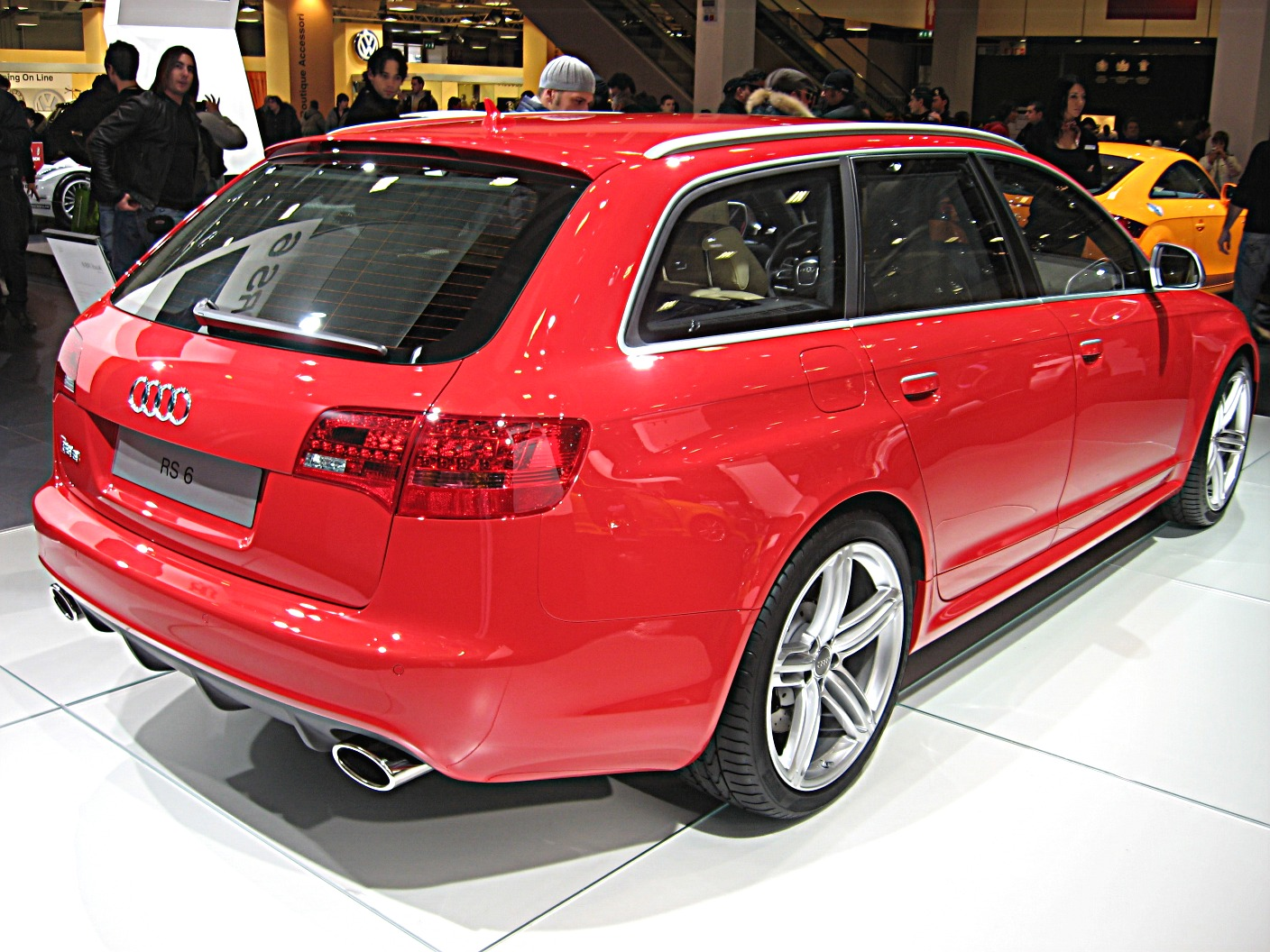
Audi RS6 Avant quattro (C6)

The C6 RS 6 Avant was launched in April 2008, and the four-door saloon/sedan was available from August 2008. Constructed from steel in a monocoque (unibody) design, the RS 6 uses lightweight aluminium for its front wings (fenders) and bonnet (hood).

Visually, the RS 6 differed from the related S6, having flared front and rear wheel arches (fenders), harking back to the original Audi Quattro, to allow for a wider wheel track. It also had no front fog lights to allow for larger frontal air intakes (for the two side-mounted intercoolers (SMICs), and additional radiators). The ten (per side) front light-emitting diode (LED) daytime running lights (DRLs) are located within the main headlamp housing on the RS 6 in order to increase the size of the air intakes, whereas similar LEDs (but five per side) on the related S6 are found adjacent to the fog lamps in the lower front bumper. LED lighting technology was also used in the rear lights. The RS 6 also included adaptive headlights, which swivel around corners in conjunction with steering wheel movements. The facelifted Audi A6, released as a 2009 model, received similar front and rear-end LED lighting styling to that pioneered on the RS 6.

Luggage capacity, measured according to the VDA 'block method' in the Avant ranges from 565 litres (19.95 cu ft), to 1,660 litres (58.62 cu ft).

=== C6 powertrain ===
The engine (parts code: 07L, identification code: BUH) of the RS6 was what Audi claimed to be the first all-aluminium alloy even firing 5.0-litre (4,991 cc (304.6 cu in)) 90° V10 twin-turbocharged ("biturbo"), Fuel Stratified Injection (FSI), with a dry sump lubrication system. This engine is related to the naturally aspirated V10 found in the Audi R8, S6 and S8, but the RS 6's engine has around 400 unique parts.

The engine has four valves per cylinder, with chain-driven double overhead camshafts, and variable valve timing for both inlet and exhaust camshafts. Charged intake air is cooled by two side-mounted intercoolers (SMIC)s. The engine is controlled by two Bosch DI-Motronic MED 9.1.2 engine control units, which act as 'master' and 'slave': two ECUs are required due to the high revs the engine can achieve. It also uses mapped direct ignition system with ten individual direct-acting spark coils, an electronic drive by wire throttle (Bosch "E-Gas"), cylinder-selective knock control, and cylinder bank adaptive lambda control, utilising eight lambda sensors.

A total of seven radiators and four electric cooling fans are needed to cool the engine and related components under the aluminium bonnet of the RS6.

Drive output passes through a ZF 6HP 28A six-speed tiptronic automatic transmission. The gear ratios are: 1st: 4.171, 2nd: 2.340, 3rd: 1.521, 4th: 1.143, 5th: 0.867, 6th: 0.691, with shortened shift times, with "Dynamic Shift Programme" (DSP) and "Sport" mode. It has paddle-shifts mounted behind the flat-bottomed steering wheel, similar in design to the Audi B7 RS 4. The gearbox is set by default, in conventional automatic mode, to delay up-changes during acceleration, and change down earlier to maximise engine braking. Downshifts in all modes of operation include the Powertrain Control Module electronic control unit (ECU) "blipping" the Bosch "E-Gas" drive by wire throttle, for smoother shifts. The hydraulic torque converter includes a lock-up function in all forward gears and is able to completely disconnect when the vehicle is stationary, thus saving fuel.

Like all Audi "RS" models, the RS 6 is fitted with Audi's 'trademark' Quattro permanent four-wheel drive as standard. This version of the RS 6 uses the latest asymmetric dynamic 40:60 front-to-rear default torque distribution from the Torsen T-3 'automatic torque biasing' (ATB) centre differential. This latest incarnation of the Torsen Quattro, first seen in the B7 RS 4, can automatically dynamically apportion up to a maximum 100% torque to the rear axle, or up to 80% to the front, dependent on traction conditions.

The front and rear final drives are conventional "open" differentials (ratio 3.317) and use the Audi "Electronic Differential Lock" (EDL). EDL is a part, or "function", of the Bosch ESP 8.0 Electronic Stability Programme, which also includes "Anti-Slip Regulation" (ASR) traction control system. EDL does not 'lock' the differential in a traditional sense, but uses electronics to compare the speeds of the two wheels on an axle, and brakes any wheel that is sensed to have lost traction (by rotating faster than the opposite wheel, beyond normally accepted deviations). This braking of a slipping wheel has the effect of transferring torque across the axle to the other wheel, which is assumed still to have traction.

=== C6 steering and suspension ===
Like the previous RS6 and the B7 RS 4, this generation of RS 6 includes Audi's "Dynamic Ride Control" (DRC) Sports suspension system. The system is mainly mechanical, using a pump to provide additional pressure in the diagonally linked dampers (shock absorber) during cornering, to counteract rolling and pitching. The system can dynamically adjust the stiffness at each damper constantly to maintain both a comfortable ride and a high grip. In this version, it has a three-way level control, selectable from the Multi Media Interface controls.

The steering system includes rack and pinion speed-dependent "servotronic" power steering, with a ratio of 12.5, and a turning circle of 12.2 metres.

=== C6 brakes, wheels and tires ===
The standard brakes on the RS 6 are cross-drilled, radially vented, and floating iron discs. At the front they are 390 millimetres (15.35 in) diameter and 36 mm (1.417 in) thick, clamped by gloss black six-piston fixed Brembo monoblock alloy calipers incorporating the "RS" logo, and at the rear they are 356 mm (14.02 in) diameter and 28 mm (1.102 in) with black single-piston floating calipers and an integrated electro-mechanical parking brake linkage. The parking brake serves doubles as a full emergency brake whilst the car is in motion, by applying maximum braking effort to all four wheels, resulting in activating the Anti-lock Braking System (ABS).

Optional "Audi ceramic" Carbon fibre-reinforced Silicon Carbide (C/SiC) composite front brakes are available, only with 20-inch wheels, which use 420 mm (16.54 in) diameter by 40 mm (1.575 in) thick drilled, vented, and floating SGL Carbon composite discs, with grey painted eight-piston fixed Alcon monobloc alloy calipers with the "Audi ceramic" logo.

Irrespective of the type of disc construction, all brake discs are mounted via high strength steel mounting pins which connect the 'working' surface of the disc to lightweight alloy disc hubs.

A specifically 'tuned' "sport-biased" Bosch ESP 8.0 Electronic Stability Programme is standard, and includes Anti-lock Braking System (ABS) and Electronic Brakeforce Distribution (EBD), and Brake Assist (BA). This ESP system has three user-selectable settings: "ESP-on" - the standard default full protection mode, "ESP-sportmode" (which turns off the ASR and EDL traction functions), and "ESP-off" (which fully disables all 'stability' and 'traction' related functions).

Standard wheels (in the UK) are 9.5Jx20-inch '5-segment-spoke' design alloy wheels running on 275/35 ZR20 102Y XL (eXtra Load) tyres (rated at 850 kg (1,874 lb) per tyre), with official supplies being either Pirelli P-Zero Rosso or Dunlop SP SportMaxx GT. No-cost options are 9.5Jx20 '7-arm double spoke' design (identical style to B7 RS 4), or 9Jx19-inch '10-spoke' design alloys with 255/40 ZR19 Michelin Pilot Sport PS2 tyres.

=== C6 other notable features ===
- Digital Audio Broadcasting (DAB) digital radio tuner with DVD-based satellite navigation and Multi Media Interface (MMI), with optional hybrid digital/analogue TV tuner.
- Solar sunroof operating the air-con whilst the vehicle is stationary and the engine is turned off
- Rear window and rear side window manual sun blinds

== C7 (Typ 4G, 2013–2018) ==
Third generation (C7/4G)
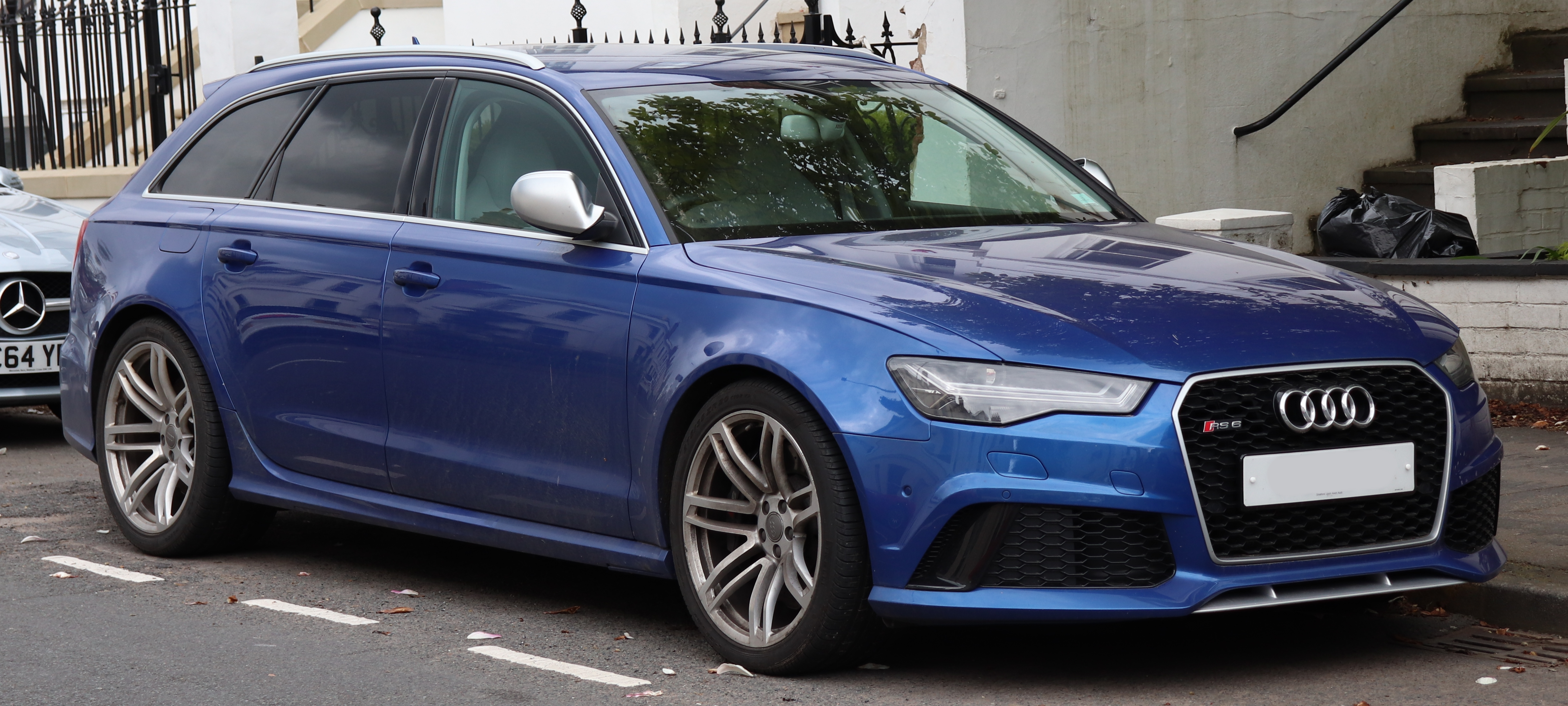
- Audi RS6 Avant quattro (C7, United Kingdom)

Overview
- Production: 2013–2018
- Designer: Stephan Fahr-Becker

Body and chassis
- Body style: 5-door Avant (estate/wagon)
- Platform: Volkswagen Group MLB platform
- Related: Audi C7 A6, Audi C7 S6

Powertrain
- Engine: Petrol: 4.0 L (3,993 cc) V8 TFSI twin-turbo DOHC (see list of Volkswagen Group petrol engines)
- Transmission: 8-speed tiptronic automatic

Dimensions
- Wheelbase: 2,915 mm (114.8 in)
- Length: 4,991 mm (196.5 in)
- Width: 1,986 mm (78.2 in)
- Height: 1,461 mm (57.5 in)
- Kerb weight: 1,950 kg (4,299 lb)

Chronology
- Predecessor: C6 RS6 (Typ 4F)
- Successor: C8 RS6 (Typ 5G)

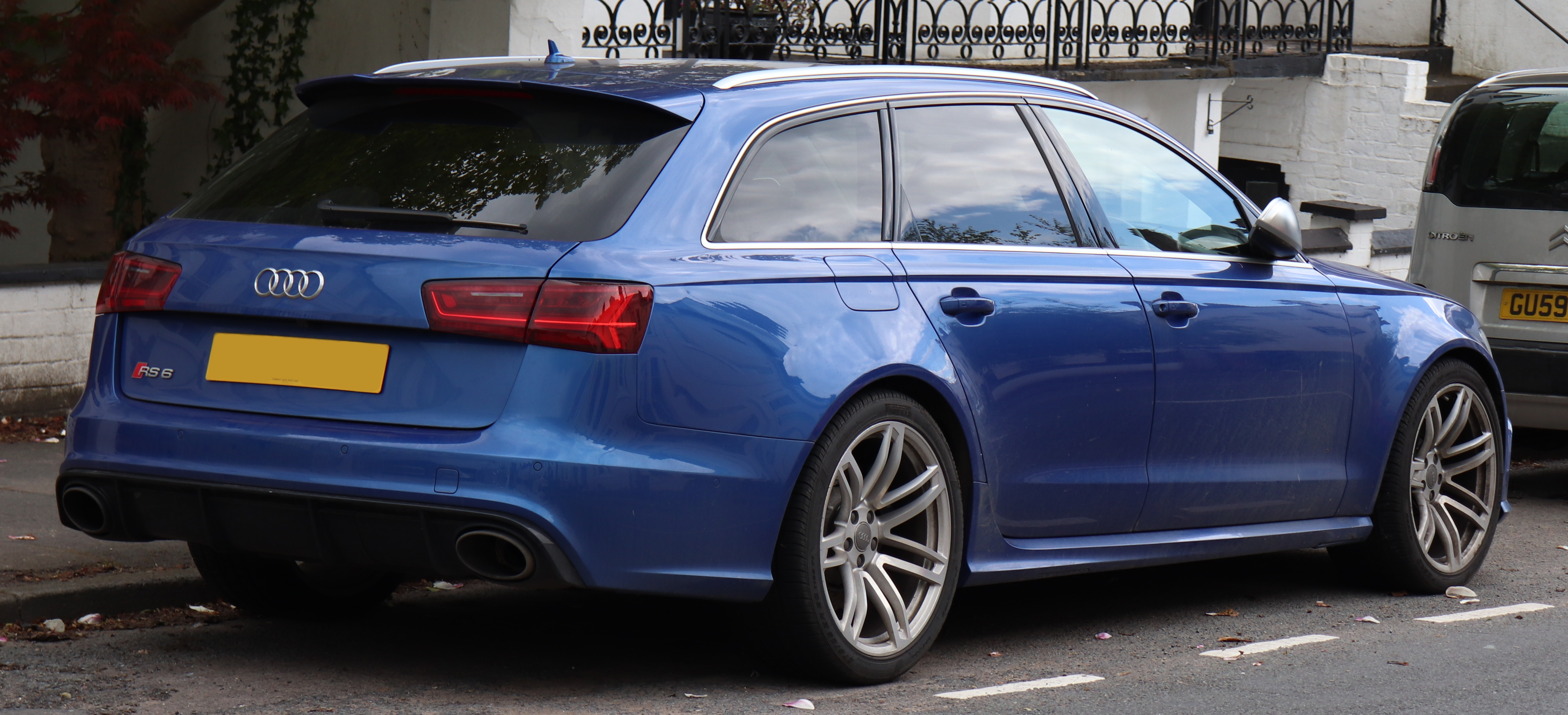
Audi RS6 (United Kingdom)

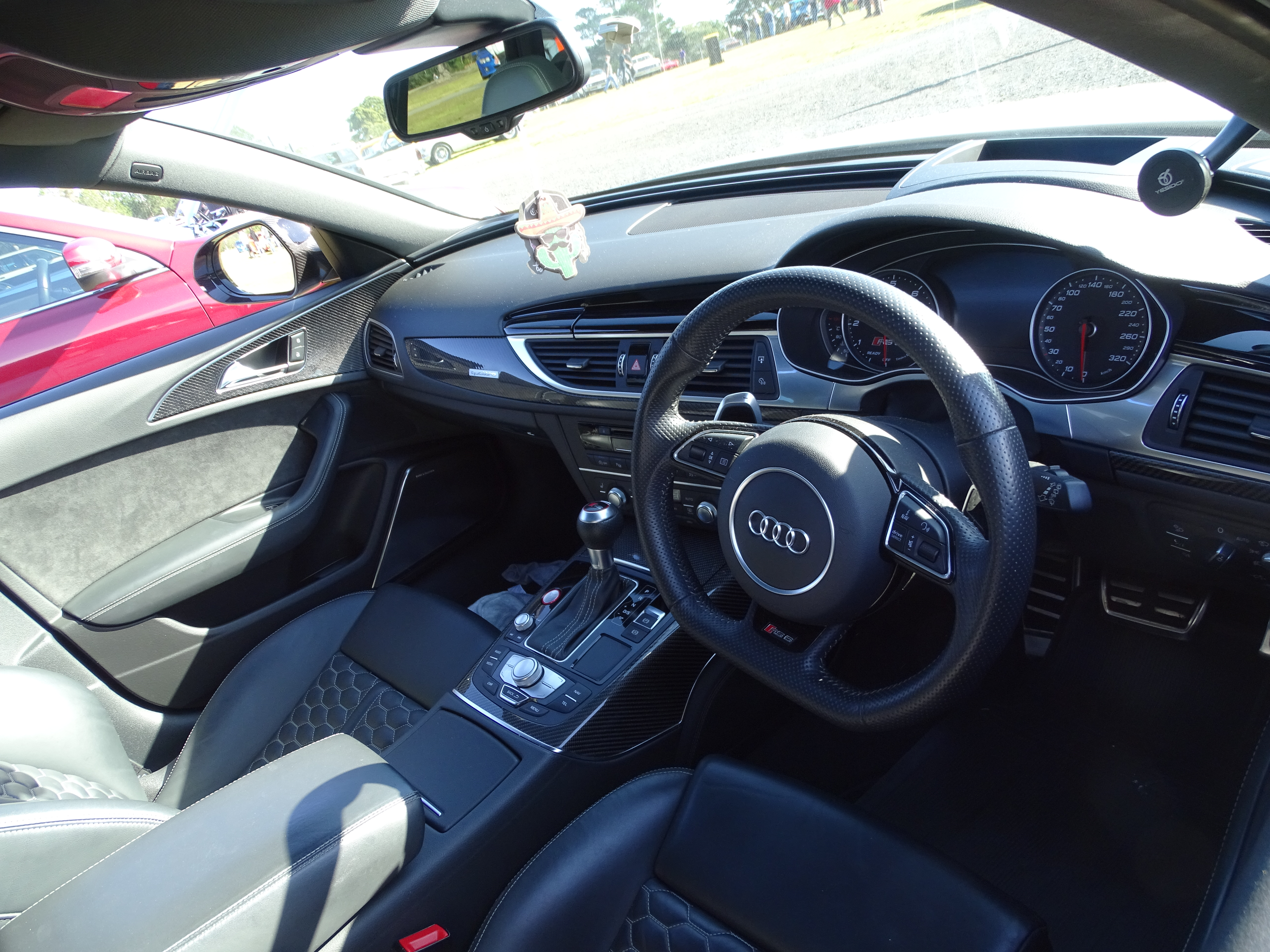
RS6 Avant interior

Audi revealed the details of the RS 6 Avant on December 5, 2012. Its twin-turbo 4.0 L (3,993 cc) TFSI V8 engine develops 412 kW (560 PS; 553 bhp) at 5700-6600 rpm and 700 N⋅m (516 lbf⋅ft) of torque at 1750-5500 rpm. This will enable the RS 6 Avant to accelerate from 0 to 100 km/h (62.1 mph) in 3.9 seconds. The top speed is limited to 250 km/h (155.3 mph) by default. By adding the optional Dynamic or Dynamic Plus package, this top speed is increased to respectively 280 km/h (174.0 mph) or 305 km/h (189.5 mph). Audi claims an average fuel consumption of 9.6 L/100 km (29.4 mpg_{‑imp}; 24.5 mpg_{‑US}) and CO_{2} emissions of 223 g/km. In order to accomplish this, Audi has added a start-stop system and a cylinder on demand system. The RS 6 Avant is offered with an 8-speed tiptronic transmission.

The C7 RS 6 was not offered in North America, however that market received RS 7 Sportback which shares the same powertrain and platform.

=== C7 RS6 Performance ===
The RS6 Avant Performance is powered by the same 4.0-litre TFSI twin-turbo V8 engine as the standard RS6, but with the help of a revised ECU map, power output was increased to 605 PS (445 kW; 597 bhp) at 6100-6800 rpm, and torque to 750 N⋅m (553 lbf⋅ft) at 2500-5500 rpm.

Top speed remains limited to 250 km/h (155.3 mph), or 305 km/h (189.5 mph) with Dynamic Plus package, with the 0 to 100 km/h (62.1 mph) time reduced to 3.7 seconds, and 0 to 200 km/h (124.3 mph) in 12.1 seconds. Despite the improved performance, the fuel economy and CO_{2} are unchanged from the standard RS6 Avant.

Performance models were also fitted with Audi's sports exhaust, choice of optics packs, and privacy glass. They had an updated front bumper design, and were offered with revised wheel choices (up to 21" diameter). Internally, the cars came with carbon inlays with a blue weave, and half leather-half Alcantara seats with blue stitching.

Despite some sources claiming that the performance model shipped with revised mechanical components such as a re-worked cylinder head, exhaust valves, fuel pumps and intercooler, there is no supporting evidence from Audi to back these claims up.

== C8 (Typ 5G, 2019–2025) ==
Fourth generation (C8/5G)
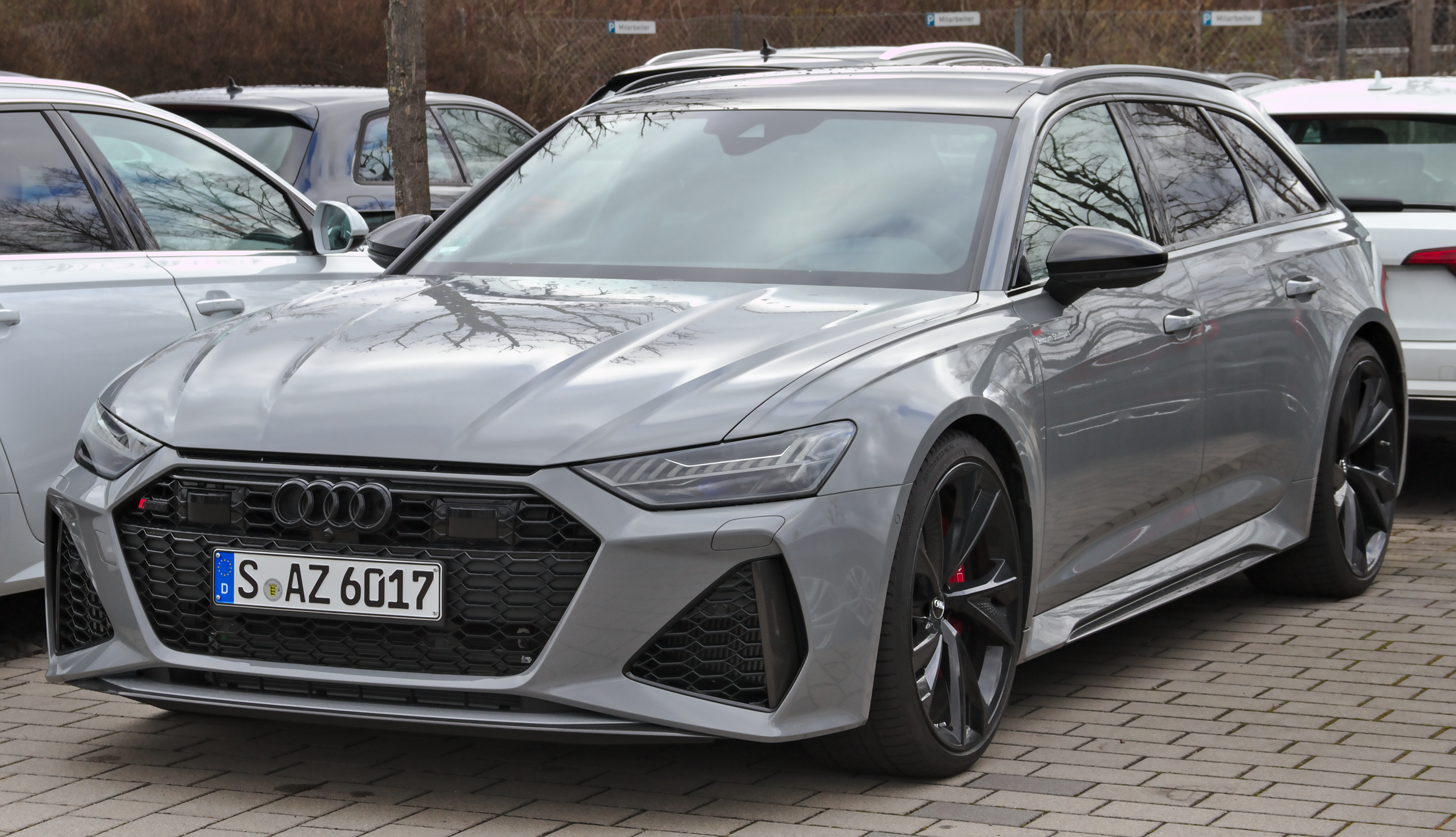

Overview
- Production: 2019–2025
- Designer: Stephan Fahr-Becker

Body and chassis
- Body style: 5-door Avant (estate/wagon)
- Platform: Volkswagen Group MLB platform
- Related: Audi C8 A6, Audi C8 S6

Powertrain
- Engine: Petrol: 4.0 L (3,996 cc) V8 TFSI twin-turbo DOHC (see list of Volkswagen Group petrol engines)
- Transmission: 8 speed ZF 8HP automatic

Dimensions
- Wheelbase: 2,929 mm (115.3 in)
- Length: 4,995 mm (196.7 in)
- Width: 1,951 mm (76.8 in) body 2,120 mm (83.5 in) with mirrors
- Height: 1,460 mm (57.5 in)
- Curb weight: 2,150 kg (4,740 lb)

Chronology
- Predecessor: C7 RS6 (Typ 4G)

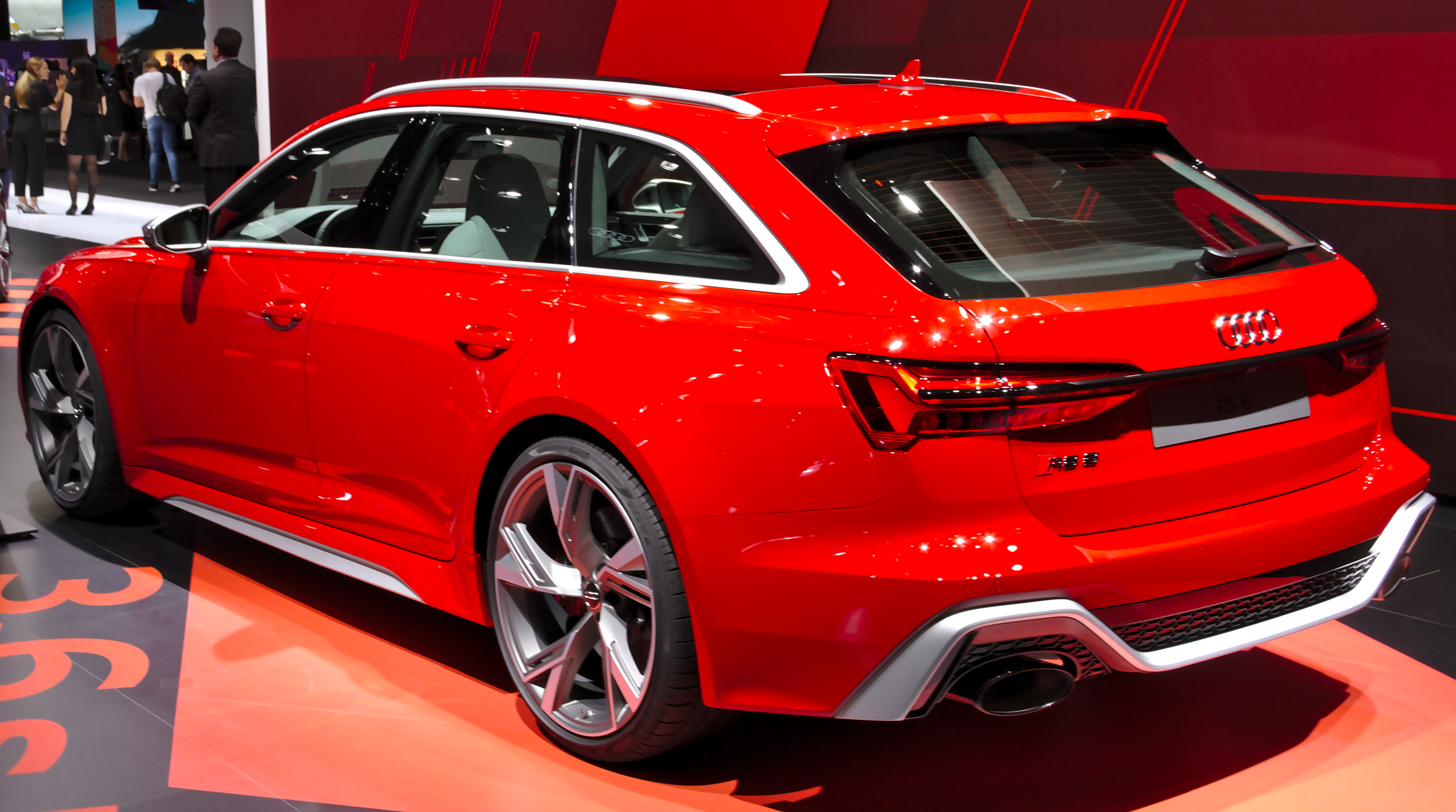
C8 RS6 Avant Rear

As with the previous generation, the new RS6 is powered by a 4.0-litre twin-turbo TFSI petrol engine, now boosted by a 48V belt alternator/starter mild-hybrid system, which can recover up to 16 bhp (12 kW). The engine also utilises a cylinder-on-demand system that can shut off half of its cylinders to boost fuel economy.

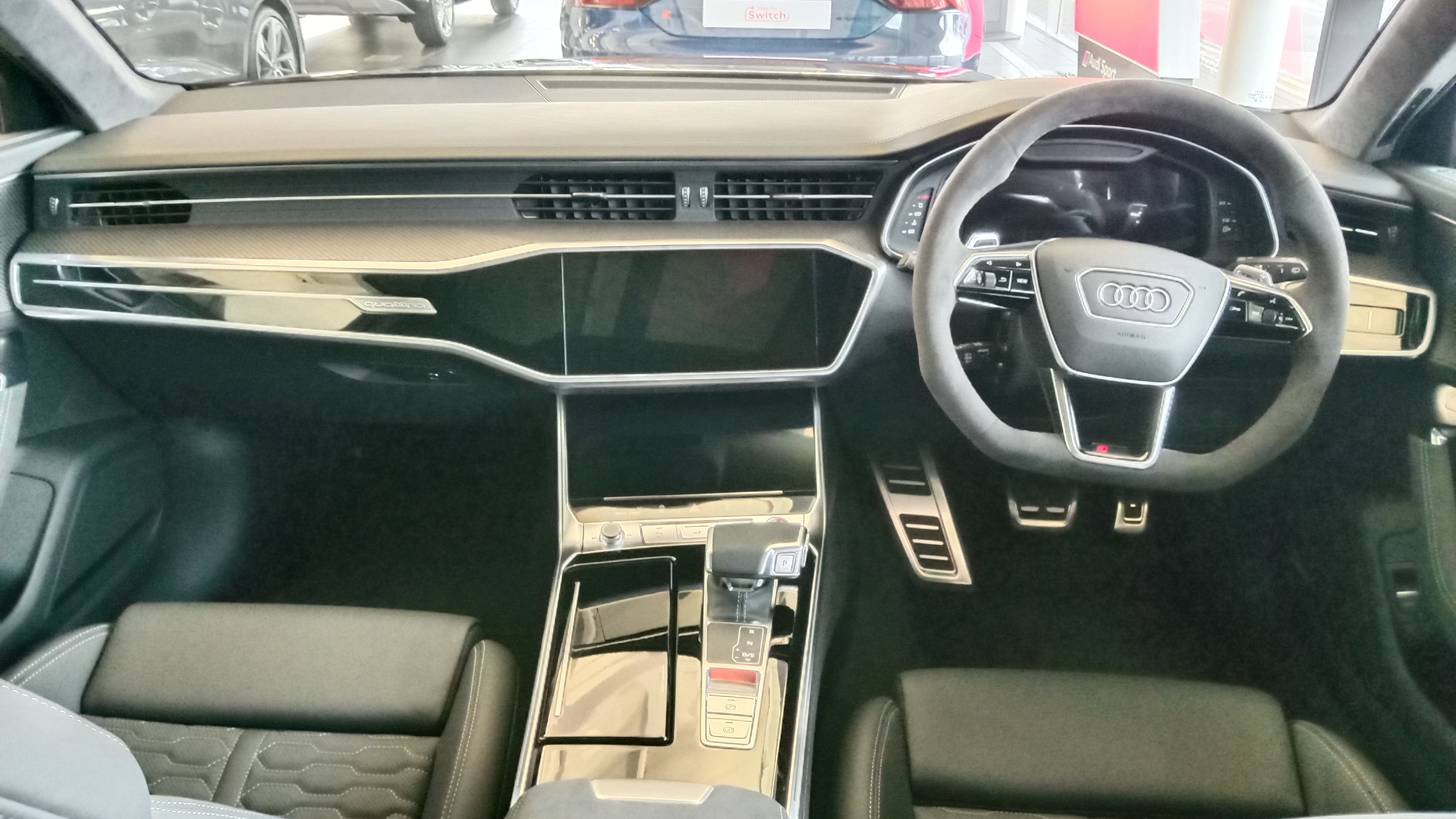
C8 RS6 Avant interior

The powertrain produces 600 PS (441 kW; 592 bhp) with 800 N⋅m (590 lbf⋅ft) available between 2100 rpm and 4500 rpm.

The acceleration to 100 km/h (62 mph) takes 3.6 seconds and 200 km/h (120 mph) in 12 seconds. As standard, top speed is limited to 250 km/h (155 mph), with a further two levels courtesy of optional packs – the Dynamic package allows 280 km/h (174 mph), while the Dynamic package plus grants even more headroom for a maximum of 305 km/h (190 mph). The C8 is the first RS 6 Avant to have the hybrid drivetrain, utilising a Riemen-Starter-Generator and a 48-volt electrical system. The Quattro system has power distribution with 40% for front and 60% for rear. The system can adjust the power distribution up to 70% for front and to 85% for the rear if needed. The adaptive suspension system is 20 mm lower than standard A6 and can lower the vehicle further 10 mm during the high-speed driving or can raise the ride 20 mm at low speed. The Drive Select function gains configurable RS1 and RS2 modes, which are activated by an ‘RS mode’ button positioned on the steering wheel. As well as adjusting the engine and handling responses, they also enable bespoke information on the Virtual Cockpit system.

Under the new Euro-7 emissions law, Chairman of the Management Board of Audi, Herbert Diess recently said "The RS range set will be the biggest change in the production line since 2004. The new RS range will be the most economical, low emission with the RS6 and Q8 will both have electric hybrid engines to reduce the current emission by 27%." The new Electric range will begin production in the Audi Sport GmbH Neckarsulm factory in Germany. The new RS range is set to be in Australia and is said to have a three-cylinder hybrid plug-in, also currently being taken on by Mercedes Benz in order to comply with the new Euro-7 emission law.

The C8 RS 6 Avant will also be sold in North America, the first time that an RS 6 was offered there since the C5-based RS 6. It will be sold alongside the RS 7 Sportback and RS Q8 that share the same powertrain.

=== C8 RS6 Avant "RS Tribute edition" ===
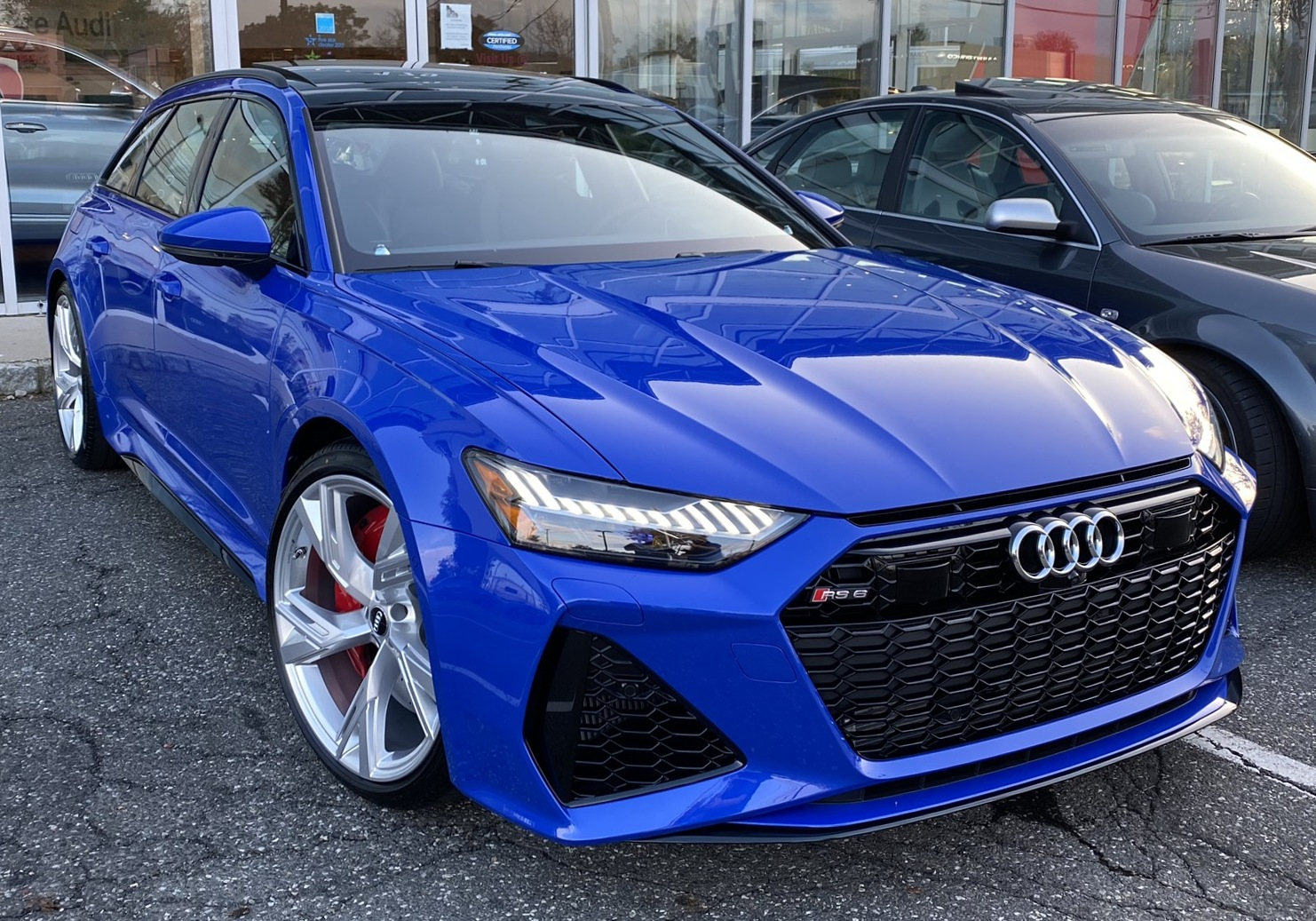
RS Tribute Edition (front)

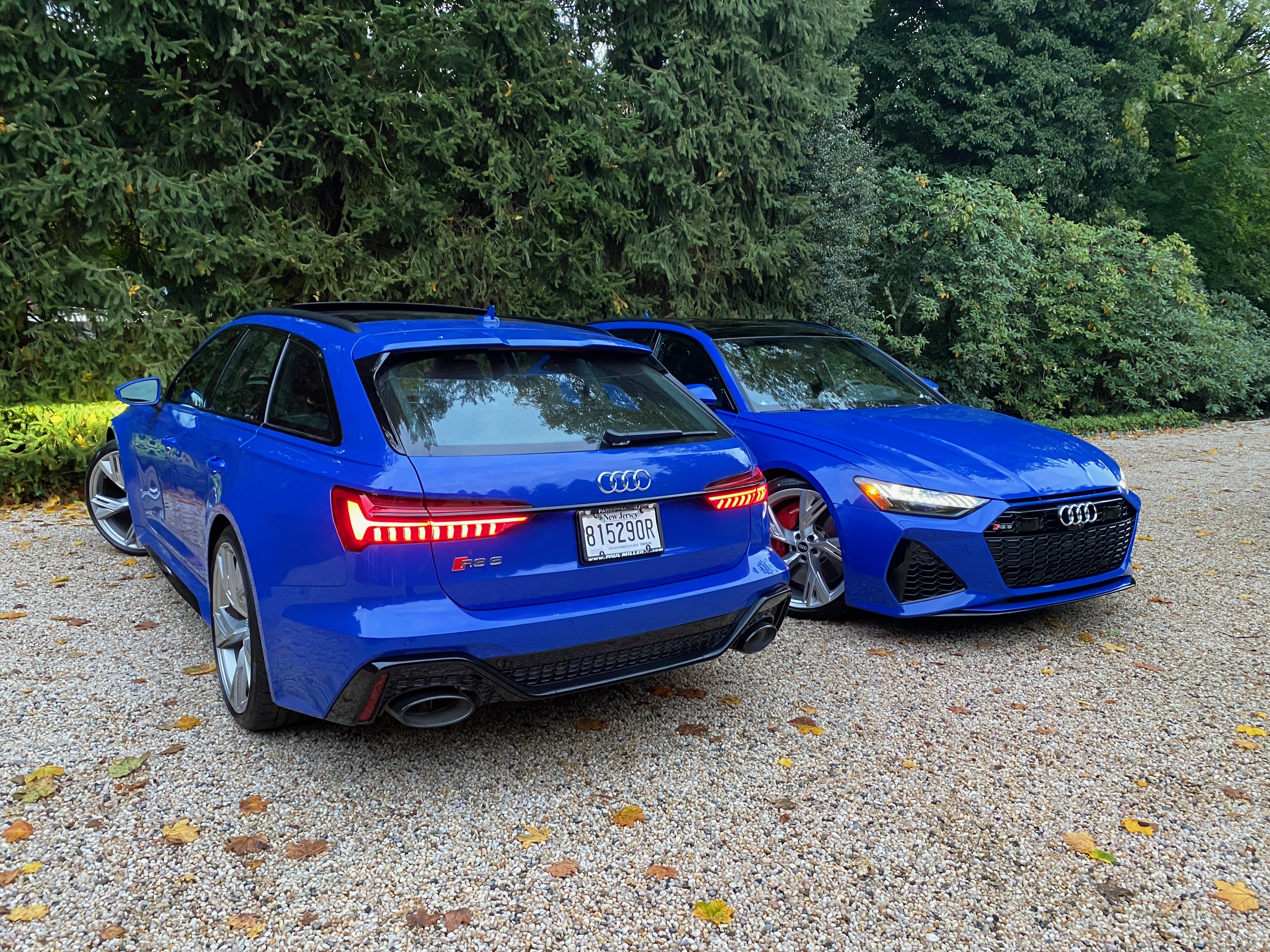
Rear

The RS 6 Avant "RS Tribute edition" was introduced for 2021 and pays tribute to the RS 2 Avant. This special edition was only available in North America and limited to 25 examples. They are different from the European tributes in how they were all optioned.

Exterior highlights include Nogaro Blue pearl effect exterior paint with body-colored mirrors, black optic roof rails, front grills, spoiler, side trim, and rear diffuser, red brake calipers, 22" silver cast-aluminum wheels, and an RS sport exhaust with black tips. Interior Highlights include carbon twill structure inlays, Audi Exclusive Valcona S sport seats, lower seat panels, leather interior elements, and RS floor mats all with Denim Blue contrast stitch, and an Audi Exclusive steering wheel with Denim Blue contrast stitching. In addition, the vehicles are equipped with a Bang & Olufsen 3D Advanced Sound System package, the Executive package, and the Driver Assistance package.

=== C8 RS6 Avant performance ===
In November 2022, Audi announced new performance versions of the RS6 Avant and RS7 models. The twin-turbocharged 4.0-liter V-8 engine now produces 630 PS (463 kW; 621 bhp) at 6,000 rpm and 850 N⋅m (627 lbf⋅ft) from 2,300 rpm to 4,500 rpm, increases of 30 PS (22 kW; 30 bhp) and 50 N⋅m (37 lbf⋅ft) compared with non-performance versions.

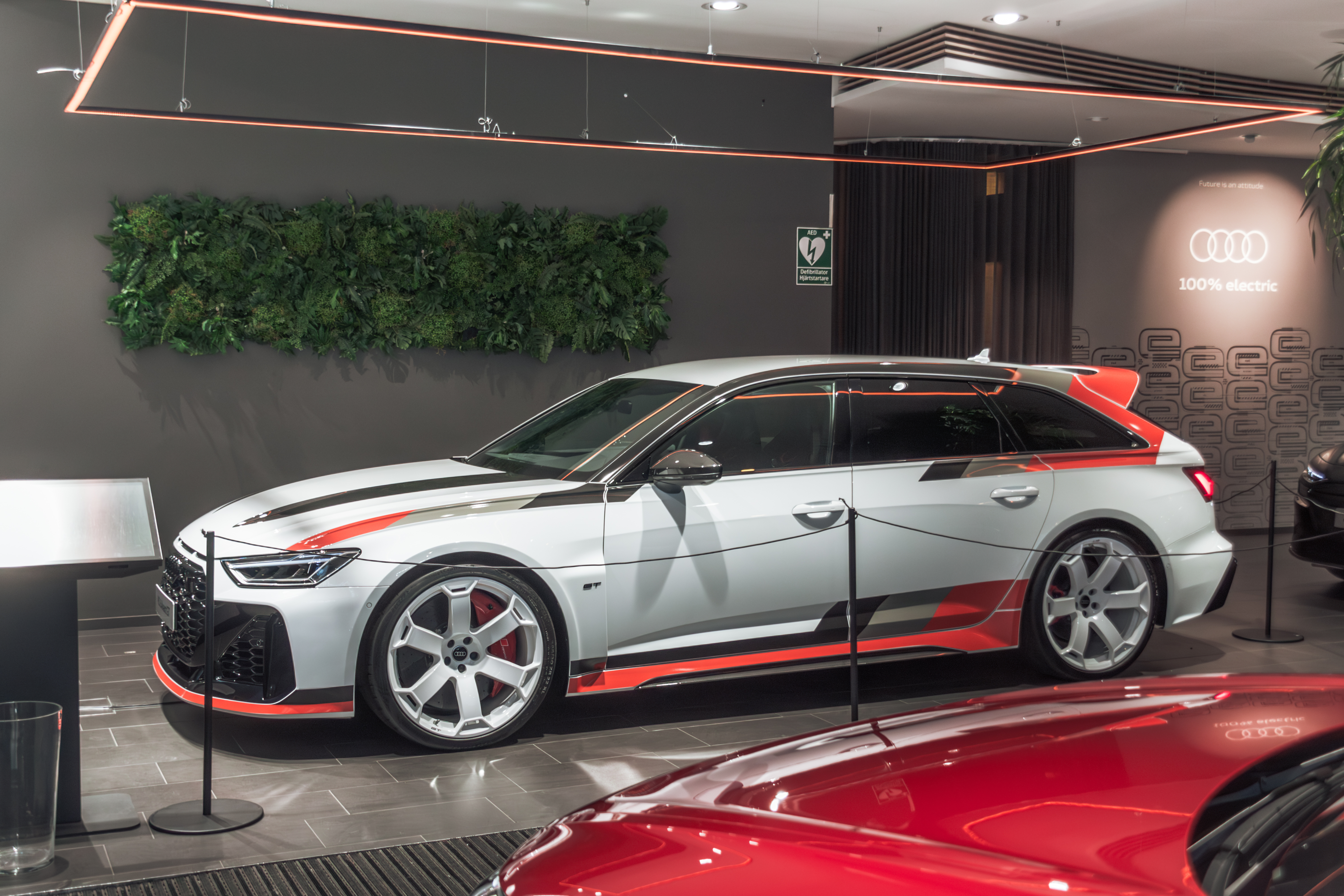
Audi RS6 Avant GT

=== C8 RS6 Avant GT ===
In February 2024, Audi launched the RS6 Avant GT, limited to 660 examples. The RS6 Avant GT is inspired by the 1989 Audi 90 IMSA GTO race car. Exterior changes include a carbon fiber bonnet, a new front bumper with a splitter, new rear bumper, and a double roof spoiler. The weight has also been reduced by 15 kg (33 lb), reducing the 0-62 mph (100 km/h) time by a tenth to 3.3 seconds. Other changes include revised differentials and suspension.

== See also ==
- Audi Sport GmbH
- Audi S and RS models
- Audi A6
- Audi S6
- Audi S4
- Audi RS4
- List of vehicle speed records
