= Volkswagen Group C platform =

Overview
- Manufacturer: Volkswagen Group
- Production: 1969–2012

Body and chassis
- Layout: Longitudinal Front-engine, front-wheel-drive; Longitudinal Front-engine, all-wheel-drive

Chronology
- Successor: Volkswagen Group MLB platform

The Volkswagen Group C platform is a series of extended midsize automobile platforms from the German automotive concern Volkswagen Group. It has been used for luxury automobiles under the Audi marque. It is the Group's oldest platform, having started with the Audi 100 in 1969.

== C1 ==
1969–1976. C1 (F104) platform cars:

- Audi 100 (1969–1976)

== C2 ==
1976–1984. C2 (Typ 43) platform cars:

- Audi 100 (1976–1982)
- Audi 200 (1979–1983) (Audi 5000 in USA)

== C3 ==
1983–1992. C3 (Typ 44) platform cars:

- Audi 100 (Audi 5000 in US 1983–1988, Audi 100 thereafter) (Audi 400 in South Africa)
- Audi 200 (1985–1990) (Audi 5000 in USA 1983–1988, Audi 200 thereafter) (Audi 500 in South Africa)
- FAW Hongqi CA7200

== C4 ==
1991–1997. C4 (Typ 4A) platform cars:

- Audi 100 (1991–1994)
- Audi S4 (UrS4) (1991–1994)
- Audi A6 (1994–1997)
- Audi S6 (UrS6) (1994–1997)

== C5 ==
1997–2004. C5 platform cars:

- Audi A6 (Typ 4B, 1997–2004)
- Audi S6 (Typ 4B, 2001–2003)
- Audi RS6 (Typ 4B, 2002–2004)
- Audi allroad quattro (Typ 4Z, 2000–2005)

== C6 ==
2004–2011. C6 (Typ 4F) platform cars:

- Audi A6 (2004–2011)
- Audi S6 (2006–2011)
- Audi RS6 (2008–2011)
- Audi A6 allroad quattro (2007–2012)

== See also ==
- Volkswagen Group D platform
