= Audi S6 =

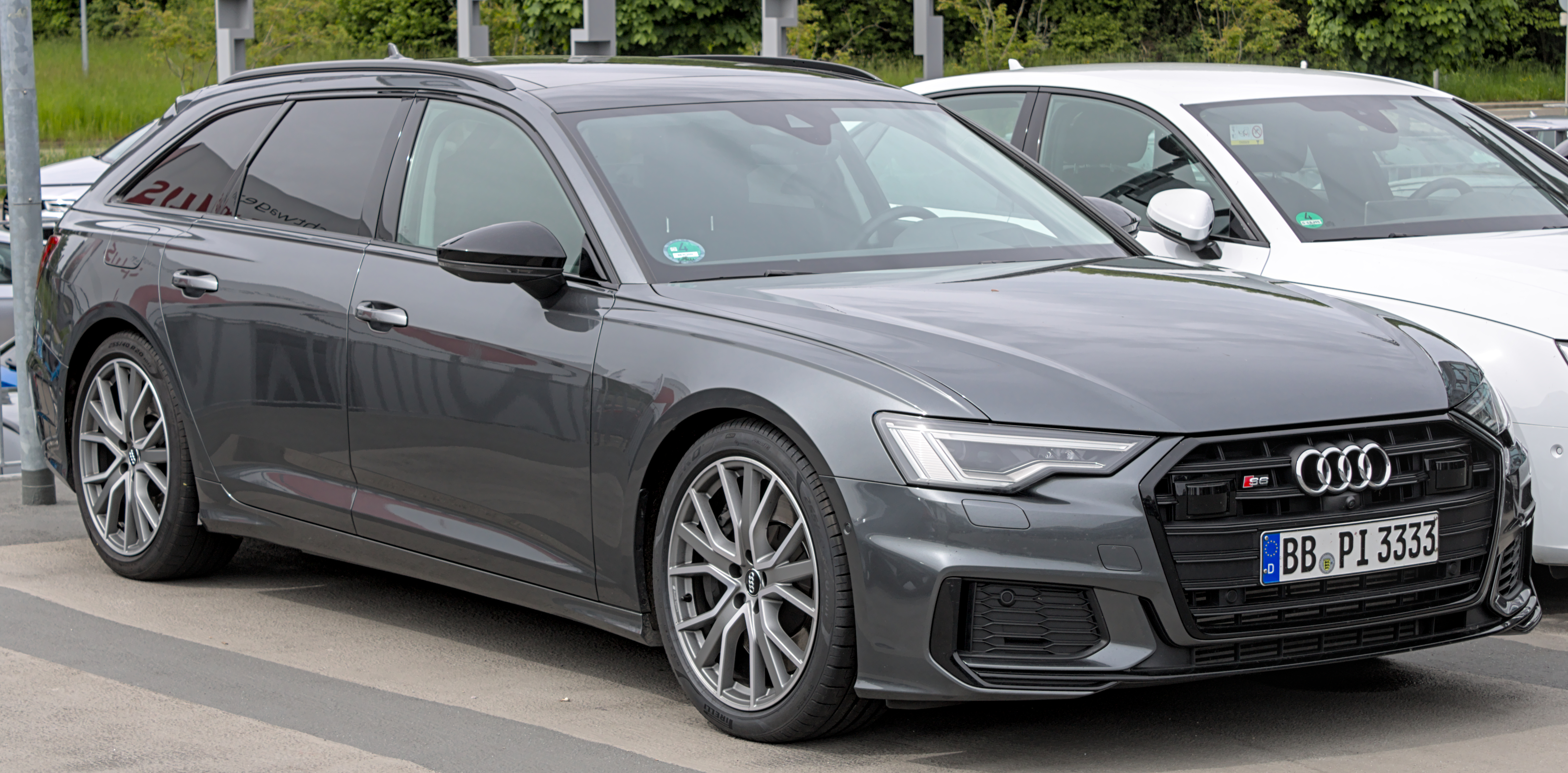
- Audi S6 Avant (C8)

Overview
- Manufacturer: Audi AG
- Production: 1994–1997; 1999–2003; 2006–2025
- Assembly: Germany: Neckarsulm

Body and chassis
- Class: Executive car (E)
- Body style: 4-door saloon/sedan, 5-door Avant (estate/wagon)
- Layout: Front engine, quattro permanent four-wheel drive
- Platform: Volkswagen Group C platform series
- Related: Audi A6; Audi RS6

The Audi S6 is a high-performance variant of the Audi A6, an executive car produced by German automaker Audi. It went on sale in 1994, shortly after the "A6" designation was introduced, replacing the "100" nameplate.

The original S6 was largely identical to the outgoing Audi S4 (C4) (Often referred to as the Ur-S4), with the only visible differences being new body-cladding and badging. In certain markets where the even-higher performance RS6 (which is also based on the A6) is not sold, the S6 serves as the most powerful trim level for the A6 lineup.

The S6, like all Audi "S" models, is fitted as standard with Audi's trademark quattro four-wheel drive (4WD) system, using the Torsen-based permanent 4WD.

== C4 (Typ 4A, 1994–1997) ==
First generation (C4/4A)
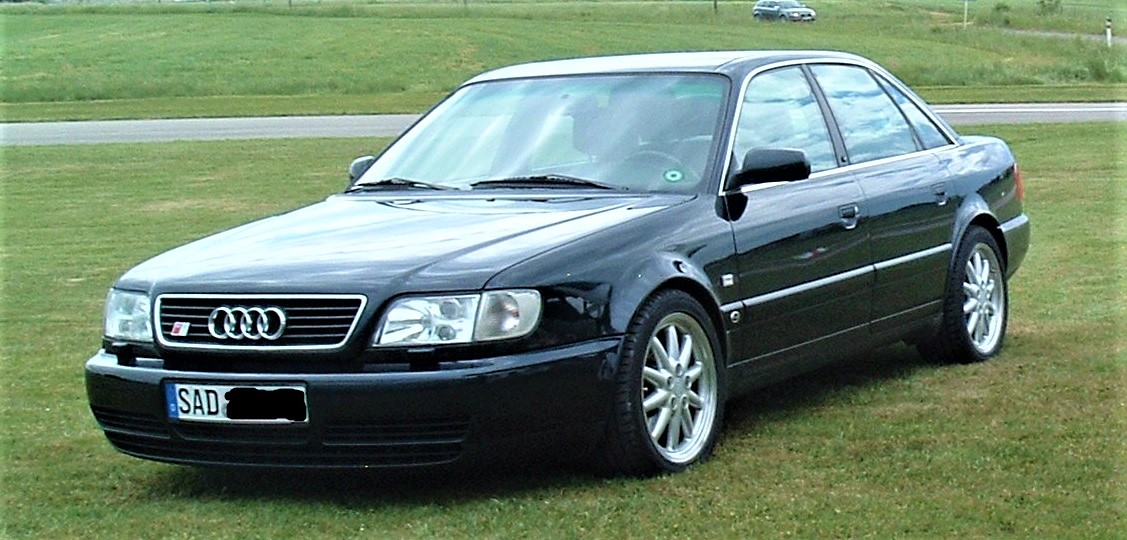
- Audi S6 saloon (C4)

Overview
- Production: 1994–1997

Body and chassis
- Platform: Volkswagen Group C4
- Related: Audi C4 100; Audi C4 S4; Audi C4 A6

Powertrain
- Engine: 2.2 L 20v turbo I5; 4.2 L 32v DOHC V8
- Transmission: 5-speed manual, 6-speed manual, 4-speed automatic

Dimensions
- Wheelbase: 2,692 mm (106.0 in)
- Length: 4,892 mm (192.6 in)
- Width: 1,803 mm (71.0 in)
- Height: saloon: 1,435 mm (56.5 in); Avant: 1,499 mm (59.0 in)
- Kerb weight: saloon: 1,730 kg (3,814 lb); Avant: 1,780 kg (3,924 lb)

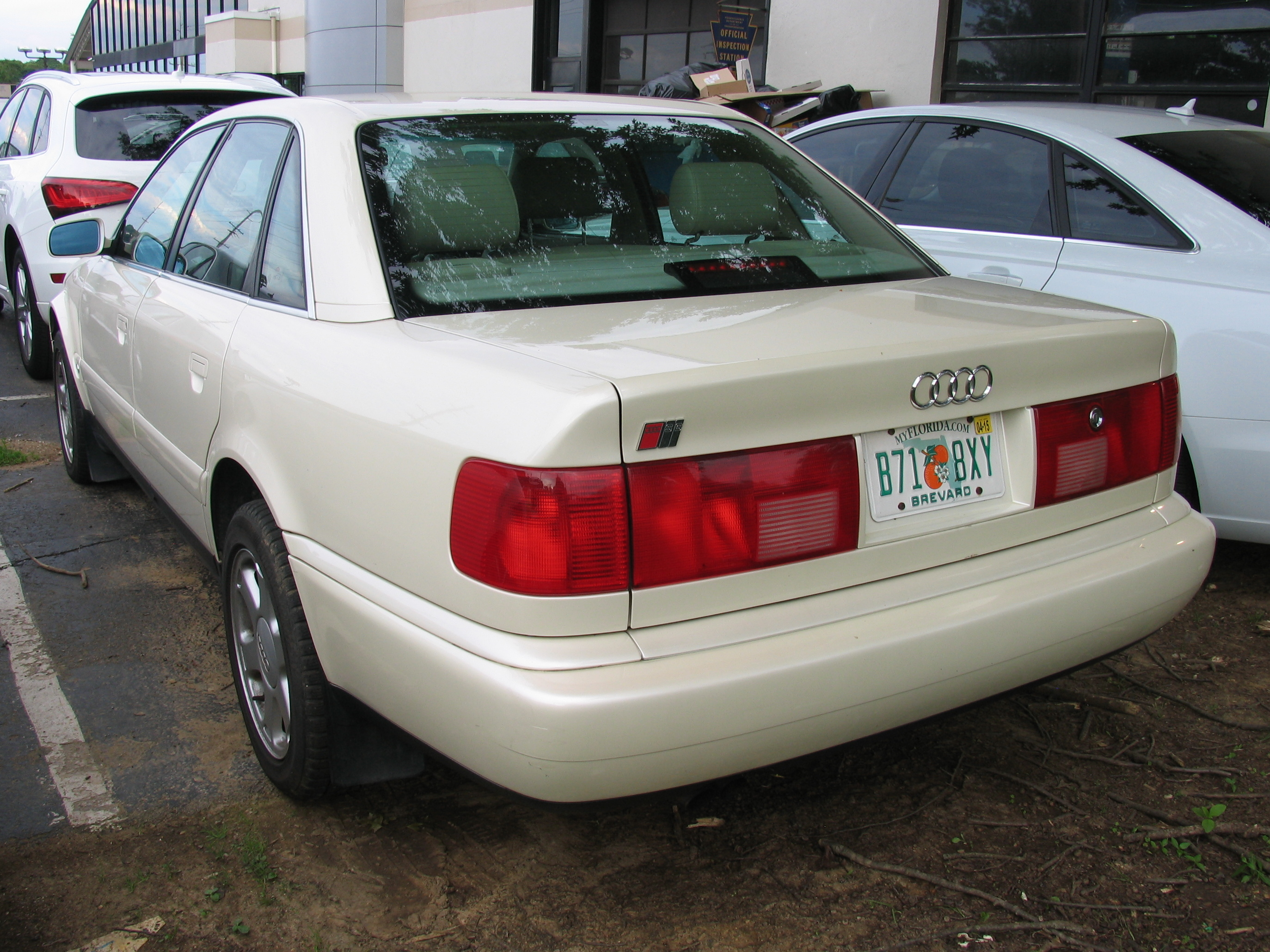
Audi S6 sedan

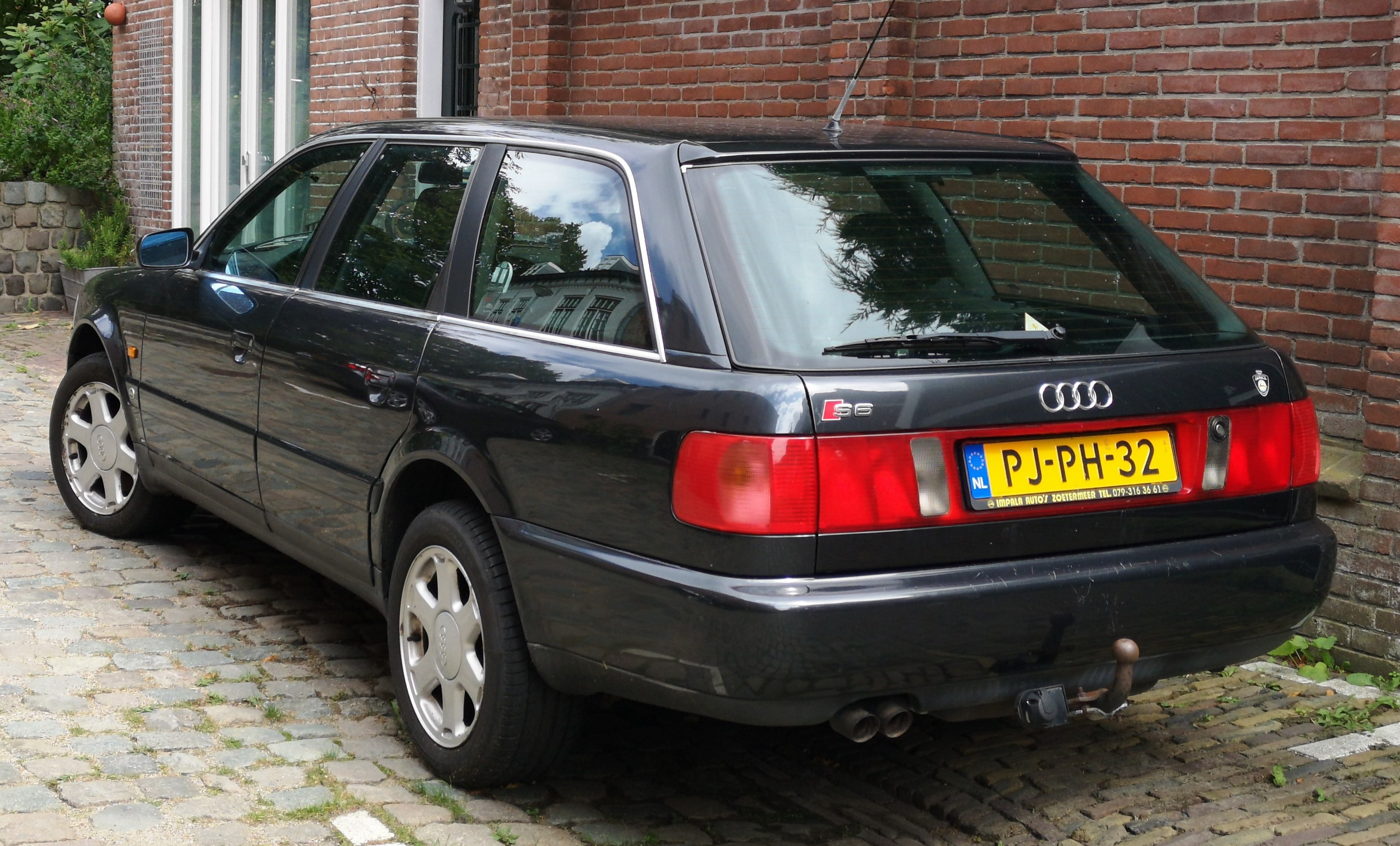
S6 Avant

Audi was restructuring their model lineup in early and mid-1990s, and in late 1994, began selling the fifth generation (C4) Audi 100 model, re-badged as the Audi A6. Wanting to keep a sports-saloon in their lineup, the company made small revisions to what was previously known as the Audi S4, renaming it the Audi S6; the S4 name would eventually be re-used for a completely different model derived from Audi's smaller Volkswagen Group B platform-based Audi A4. As this was the first S6 model from Audi, it is sometimes referred to as the Ur-S6, derived from the German augmentive, "Ursprünglich" (meaning: original).

It was available as both a saloon/sedan (typ 4A5), and an "Avant" (typ 4A9) (estate/wagon) to European and United States customers, but only as a saloon in Canada, Asia and Australia. Audi's trademark "procon-ten" safety system was standard fitment.

=== C4 powertrain ===
From its launch in late 1994, the Audi S6 was powered by a 2,226 cubic centimetres (135.8 cu in) turbocharged inline five-cylinder petrol engine (parts code prefix: 034, identification code: AAN) with a Bosch Motronic electronic engine control unit (ECU), producing a motive power output of 169 kW (230 PS; 227 bhp) at 5,900 rpm, and 350 N⋅m (258 lb⋅ft) at around 1,950 rpm, whilst consuming high octane "Super Plus" 98RON unleaded petrol.

The S6 has a top speed of 241 km/h (149.8 mph), and can accelerate from 0 to 60 mph (97 km/h) in 6.1 seconds, 0 to 100 km/h (62.1 mph) in 6.7 seconds, and 0 to 160 km/h (99.4 mph) in 17.5 seconds.

The vehicle was available with a standard six-speed manual transmission (five-speed only in North America) and with the four-plus-one-speed automatic (the fifth "gear" called a 'lockup' gear, what reduced the RPM by ~400 at highway speed with cruise control on) as well, with the Audi's dynamic Torsen T-1 quattro permanent four-wheel drive system.

Audi made a 4.2-litre V8 engine (parts code prefix: 077, identification code: AEC) with a Bosch Motronic ECU available as an option in the original European S4s, and made the decision to continue to do so with the S6, making a version of the 4.2 available as an optional upgrade over the 2.2-litre inline five-cylinder turbo. The V8 produces 213 kW (290 PS; 286 bhp) at 5,800 rpm and 400 N⋅m (295 lb⋅ft) at 4,000 rpm. The V8 version can accelerate from 0 to 100 km/h (62 mph) in 5.9 seconds, and reach a top speed of 249 km/h (154.7 mph).

Unlike the five-cylinder turbocharged version, the V8-powered S6 was supplied with a four-plus-one-speed automatic transmission as standard, but kept the quattro four wheel drive. A six-speed manual gearbox was also available as an option.

=== C4 brakes, wheels and tyres ===
The C4 braking system included radially ventilated disc brakes front and rear; with 314 mm (12.4 in) diameter by 30 mm (1.18 in) thick discs, with two-piston floating Girling calipers bearing the interlocking four-ringed Audi logo, and four individual pads per caliper up front, and 269 mm (10.6 in) by 20 mm (0.79 in) discs with Lucas single-piston sliding calipers at the rear. Bosch Anti-lock Braking System (ABS) with EDS was also standard.

Standard wheels were 7½Jx16 "Avus" cast aluminium alloy wheels with 205/55 R16 tyres. An optional 7½Jx16 five-arm alloy wheel, with 205/55 R16 tyres, an 8Jx16 five double-spoke alloy, an 8Jx17 10-spoke alloys "Bolero" were also available with 225/45 R17 tyres.

=== C4 exterior ===
Changes to the exterior of the C4 S6 over the standard A6 include flared front wheel arches, an enlarged front spoiler with additional air inlets, larger diameter twin exhaust pipes, and S6 badging on the grille and rear.

=== Audi S6 Plus ===
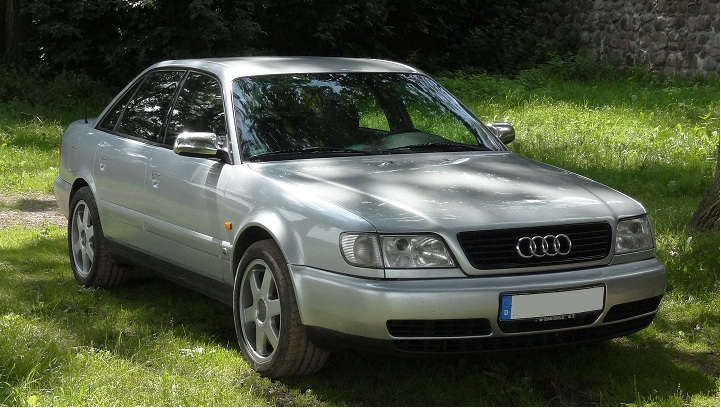
Audi S6 Plus

As a swan song to the C4 platform, an even more powerful, limited-production Audi S6 Plus (Typ Q1) was briefly available to European customers. The S6 Plus, developed by Audi's wholly owned high performance subsidiary, quattro GmbH was available for sale during the 1997 model year only (production from June 1996 to October 1997). A total of 952 cars were produced – 855 Avant, and 97 saloons.

It was powered by another version of the 32-valve (four valves per cylinder) 4.2-litre V8 engine (parts code prefix: 077, identification code: AHK, later to be seen in the Audi S8 as AKH). Audi's performance division reworked key parts of the internal combustion engine, increasing the motive power to 240 kW (326 PS; 322 bhp). It was only available with a revised six-speed manual transmission (parts code prefix: 01E, identification code: DGU) (gear ratios - 1st: 3.500, 2nd: 1.889, 3rd: 1.320, 4th: 1.034, 5th: 0.857, 6th: 0.730), with a final drive ratio of 4.111.

Further revisions were made to the suspension, brakes and wheels. The front brake discs were enlarged to 323 mm (12.7 in) in diameter by 30 mm (1.18 in) thick. Standard wheels were 8Jx17 6-spoke "Avus" cast aluminium alloy wheels with 255/40 R17 tyres on them, with an optional 7Jx16 alloy wheel for use with winter tyres was also available.

The S6 Plus saloon could accelerate from 0 to 100 km/h (62.1 mph) in 5.6 seconds, with the Avant a tenth of a second slower at 5.7 seconds.

Hella xenon high intensity discharge (HID) headlamps (still with the C4s triple bulb design, only low beam) were available as serial equipment.

== C5 (Typ 4B, 1999–2003) ==
Second generation (C5/4B)
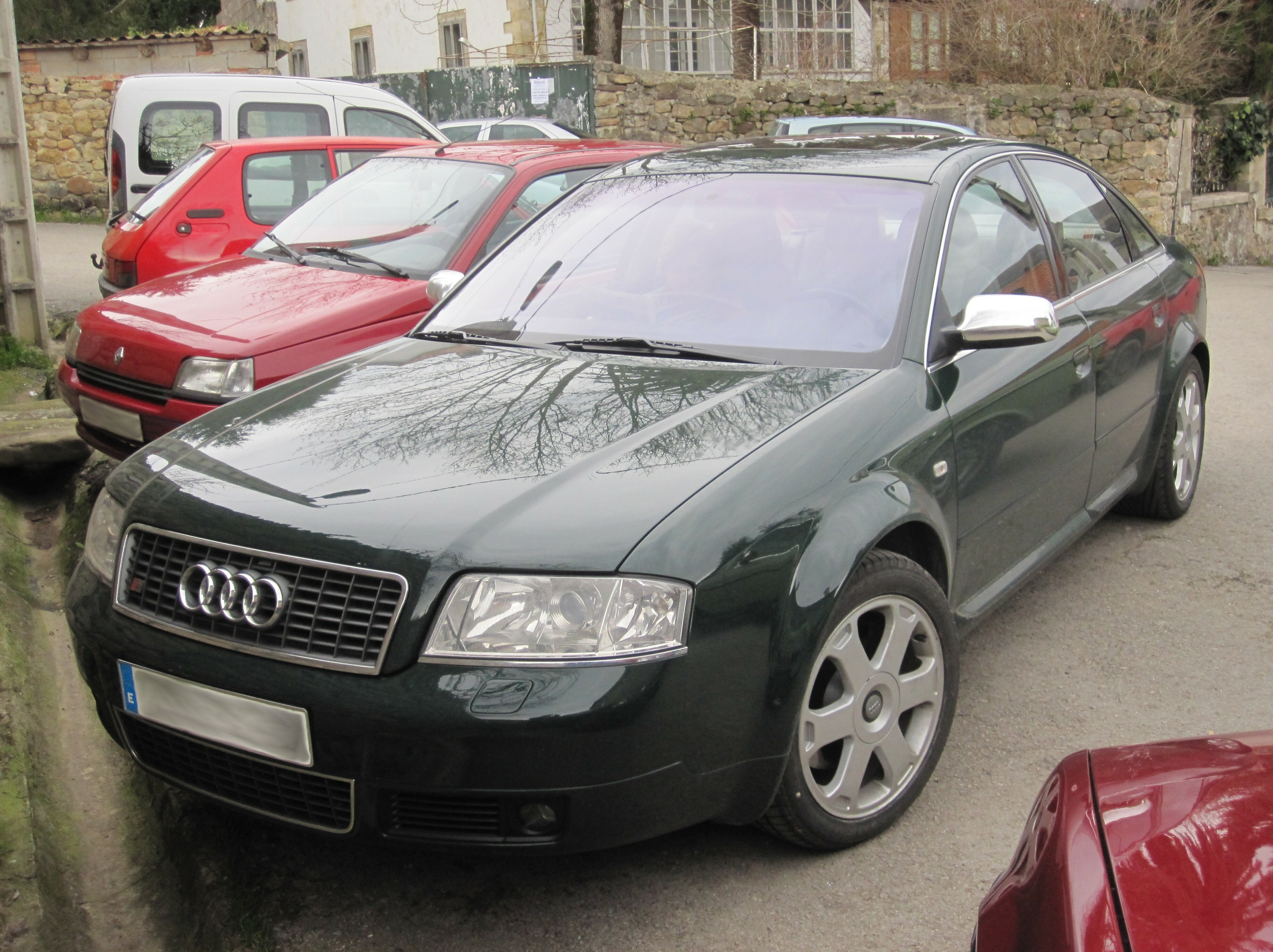
- Audi S6 sedan (C5)

Overview
- Production: 1999–2003

Body and chassis
- Platform: Volkswagen Group C5
- Related: Audi C5 A6, Audi C5 RS6

Powertrain
- Engine: 4.2 L V8 DOHC
- Transmission: 6-speed manual, 5-speed ZF 5HP24A tiptronic automatic

Dimensions
- Wheelbase: 2,759 mm (108.6 in)
- Length: 1999–2001: 4,833 mm (190.3 in); 2002–2003: 4,912 mm (193.4 in)
- Width: 1999–2001: 1,850 mm (72.8 in); 2002–2003: 1,933 mm (76.1 in)
- Height: saloon: 1,443 mm (56.8 in), 1999–2001 Avant: 1,465 mm (57.7 in); 2002–2003 Avant: 1,448 mm (57.0 in)
- Kerb weight: 1,815 kg (4,001 lb) to 1,825 kg (4,023 lb)

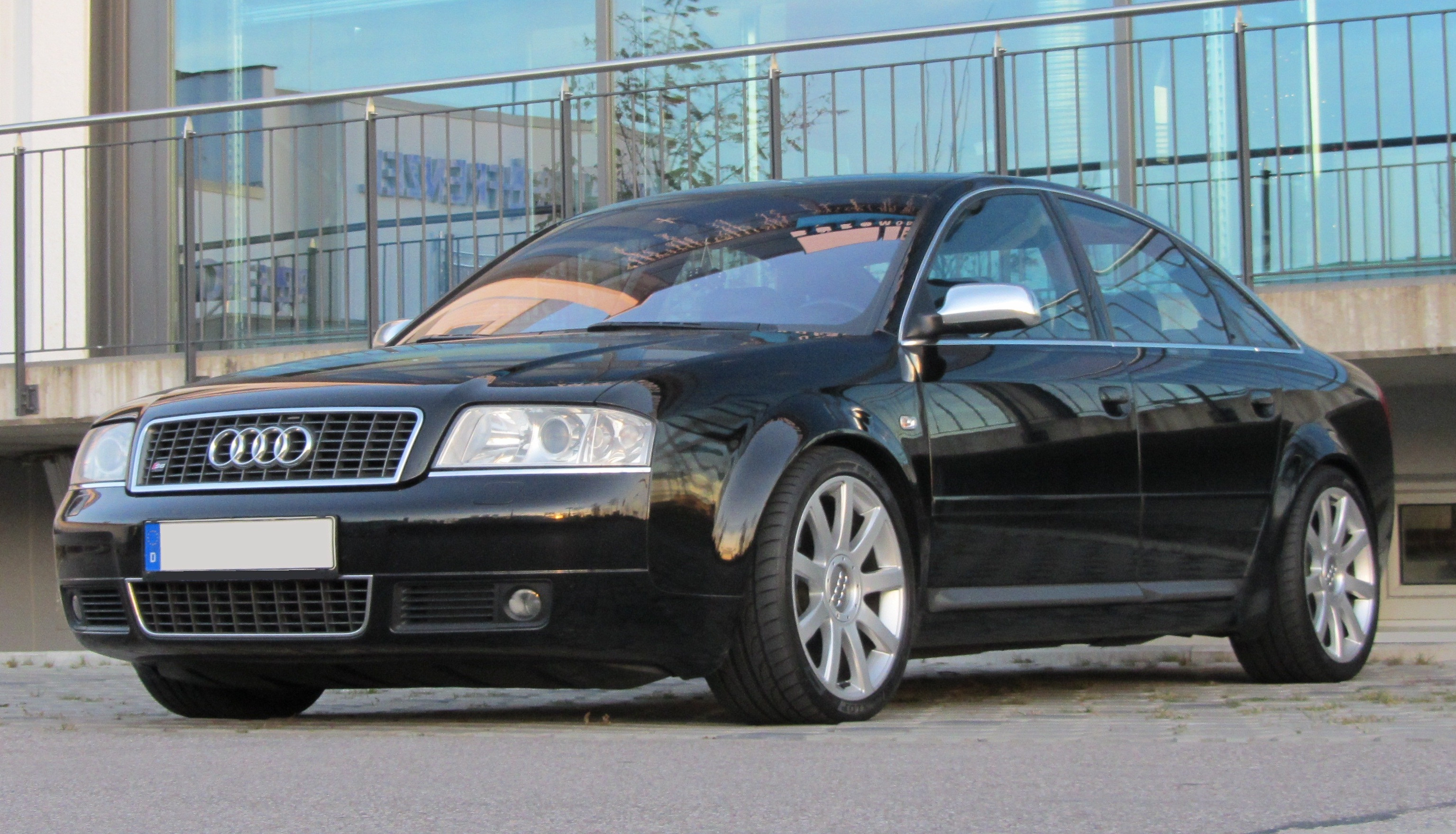
Audi S6 sedan

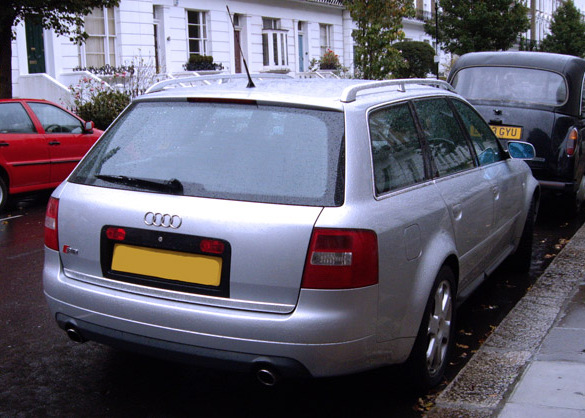
Audi S6 Avant

In late 1997, Audi introduced an all-new range of Audi A6 models, based on the Volkswagen Group C5 platform. A new Audi S6, now officially known as the Audi S6 quattro appeared in 1999, to complement its A6 platform-mate. It was available in a four-door saloon/sedan and a five-door Avant (estate/wagon). In North America, the Avant bodystyle was the only version available. The vehicle could accelerate from standstill to 100 km/h (62.1 mph) in a claimed 6.7 seconds, and from 0 to 200 km/h (124.3 mph) in 21.7 seconds. The top speed was electronically governed to 250 km/h (155.3 mph).

This generation of S6 went out of production in 2003.

=== C5 powertrain ===
The engine was a new rubber-hydro mounted all-aluminium alloy 4.2-litre 40-valve (five valves per cylinder) 90° V8 (parts code: 077, identification codes: AQJ [Sept 99-May 1], ANK [Sept 00-onwards]). It had double overhead camshafts on each cylinder bank and solenoid-operated magnesium two-stage variable intake manifold. It displaced 4,172 cubic centimetres (254.6 cu in), and was rated at 250 kW (340 PS; 335 bhp) at 6,600 rpm, producing 420 N⋅m (310 lbf⋅ft) of torque at 3,400 rpm. It satisfied the European Union EU3 emissions standard, and was managed by a Bosch Motronic ME 7.1.1 electronic engine control unit (ECU) with manifold-sited sequential fuel injection, mapped direct ignition with eight individual spark coils, Bosch longlife spark plugs, four heated lambda sensors and two catalytic converters, cylinder-selective knock control and a Bosch "E-Gas" drive by wire throttle. The engine was cooled with the aid of two electric cooling fans, replacing the single viscous fan of earlier models.

An oil-cooled six-speed manual transmission (parts code: 01E, identification code: EEY) was standard, with gear ratios as follows: 1st: 3.500, 2nd: 1.889, 3rd: 1.320, 4th: 1.034, 5th: 0.857, 6th: 0.730; final drive: 4.111. An optional ZF 5HP24A five-speed tiptronic automatic transmission was also available (parts code: 01L, identification codes: EFN [Sept 99-May 1], FBD [June 00-onwards]) with gear ratios as follows: 1st: 3.571, 2nd: 2.200, 3rd: 1.508, 4th: 1.000, 5th: 0.803; and final drive ratio: 2.909). The automatic included steering wheel mounted paddle shifters, and a "Dynamic Shift Program" (DSP) for improved gear selection based on driving conditions.(paddle shift optional) Torsen T-1 based dynamic quattro permanent four-wheel drive was also standard. Both front and rear axles utilised "Electronic Differential Lock" (EDL), which is a function of the Bosch ESP 5.7 Electronic Stability Programme.

=== C5 suspension and steering ===
Compared to its A6 sibling, the suspension on the S6 was stiffened (30% stiffer springs and shocks with 40% increased compression during damping) and lowered by 10 mm (0.39 in), and utilised gas-pressurised shock absorbers, as well as larger diameter anti-roll bars.

ZF rack and pinion "Servotronic" speed-sensitive power steering was standard.

=== C5 brakes, wheels and tyres ===
Brakes consisted of radially vented brake discs front and rear. The fronts are sized at 321 mm (12.64 in) diameter by 30 mm (1.18 in) thick, and are clamped by Lucas HP2 two-piston calipers. At the rear, the discs are 269 mm (10.59 in) by 22 mm (0.87 in), and use a Lucas single-piston sliding caliper.

Bosch ESP 5.7 Electronic Stability Programme, with Anti-lock Braking System (ABS), Brake Assist, and Electronic Brakeforce Distribution (EBD) completed the brake system.

Wheels are 8Jx17" cast alloy "Avus" 6-spoke alloy wheels, with 255/40 ZR17 tyres.

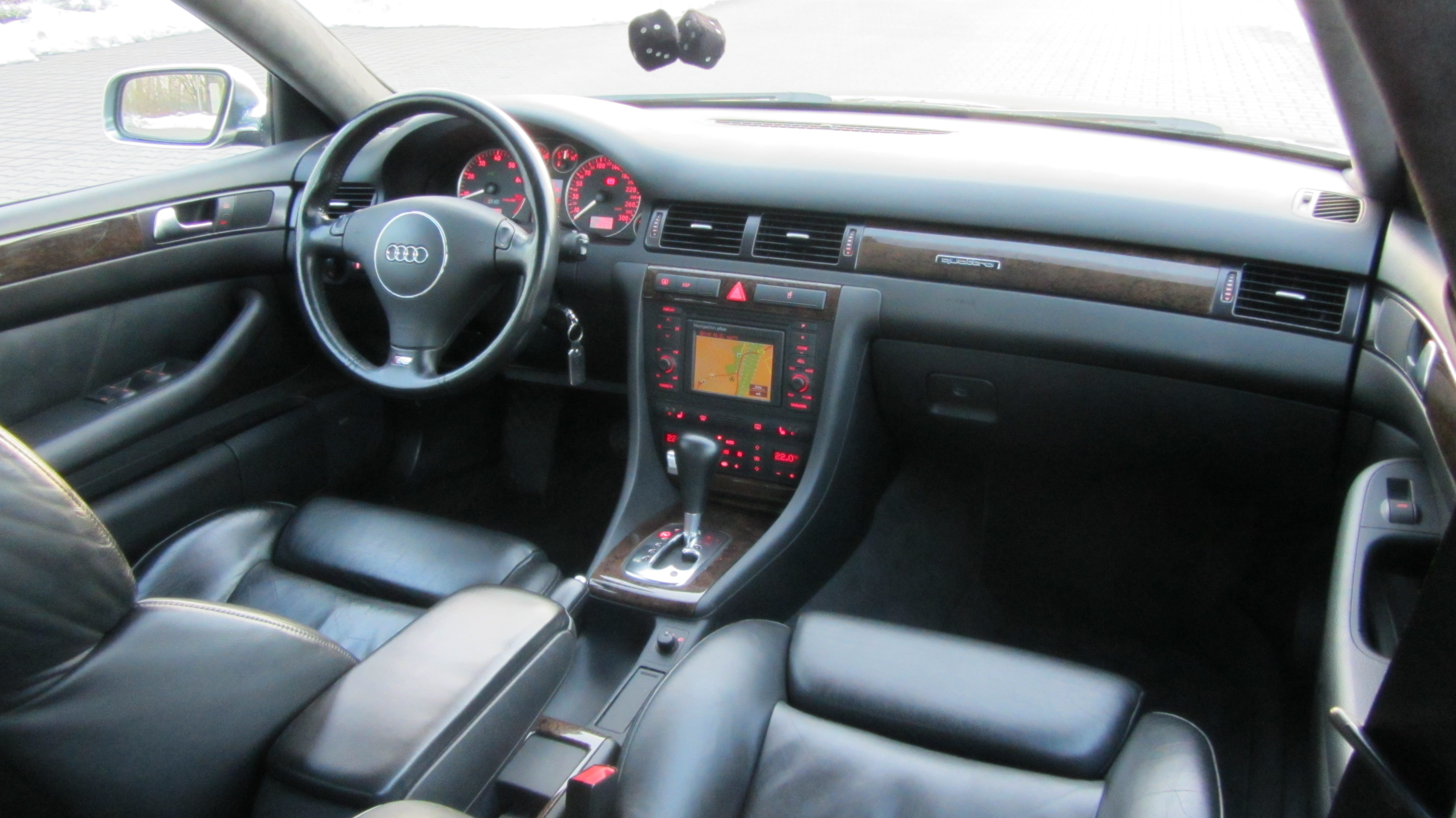
C5 S6 interior

=== C5 body and interior ===
The body panels were largely based on the Audi A6 4.2 model, with slightly flared wheel arches and door sills, with the bonnet (hood) and front wings being constructed from aluminium. Other features included S6 badging, bolstered seats (optional Recaro seats), polished aluminium exterior door mirror housings, unique front grille, and rear bootlid/tailgate spoiler.

=== Audi RS 6 (C5) ===
A higher performance Audi RS 6 was also available from 2002 to 2004. It was built by Audi's high performance private subsidiary quattro GmbH. It used a twin-turbo ("biturbo") version of the 4.2-litre V8 engine (identification code: BCY). Power output was 331 kW (450 PS; 444 bhp) at 5,700 to 6,400 rpm, and torque was 560 N⋅m (413 lbf⋅ft) from 1,950 to 5,600 rpm. The only transmission was a five-speed tiptronic automatic.

Wheels and tyres were upgraded to 255/40 ZR18 99Y XL, or 255/35 ZR19 96Y XL (5/15 arm design), and there was the "Dynamic Ride Control" (DRC) system available for the suspension, which featured diagonally interlinked shock absorbers to give better body control during extreme cornering, acceleration and braking. Compared to the standard S6, the suspension was lowered by 20 mm (0.79 in). The brake discs were ventilated and upgraded to 365 mm (14.37 in) at the front and 335 mm (13.19 in) at the rear.

It can accelerate from 0-100 km/h (62.1 mph) in 4.6 seconds. 0-200 km/h (124.3 mph) times are 16.6 seconds for the saloon and 16.8 seconds for the Avant.

== C6 (Typ 4F, 2006–2011) ==
Third generation (C6/4F)
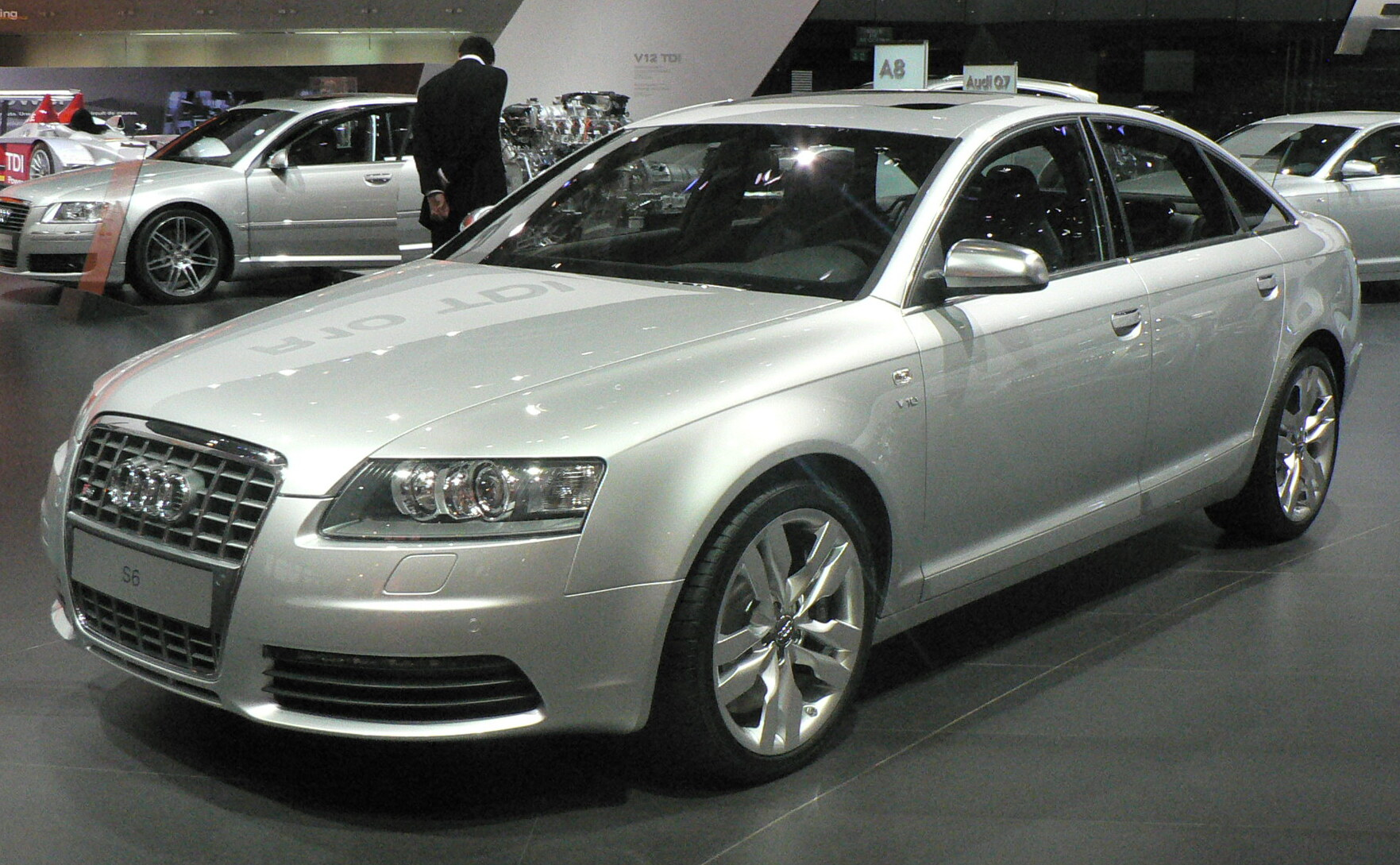
- Audi S6 (C6)

Overview
- Production: 2006-2011

Body and chassis
- Platform: Volkswagen Group C6
- Related: Audi C6 A6, Audi C6 RS6

Powertrain
- Engine: 5.2 L V10 FSI 40v DOHC
- Transmission: 6-speed ZF 6HP26 tiptronic automatic

Dimensions
- Wheelbase: 2,843 mm (111.9 in)
- Length: saloon: 4,916 mm (193.5 in), Avant: 4,933 mm (194.2 in)
- Width: 1,864 mm (73.4 in)
- Height: saloon: 1,449 mm (57.0 in), Avant: 1,453 mm (57.2 in)
- Kerb weight: saloon: 1,910 kg (4,210.8 lb), Avant: 1,970 kg (4,343.1 lb)

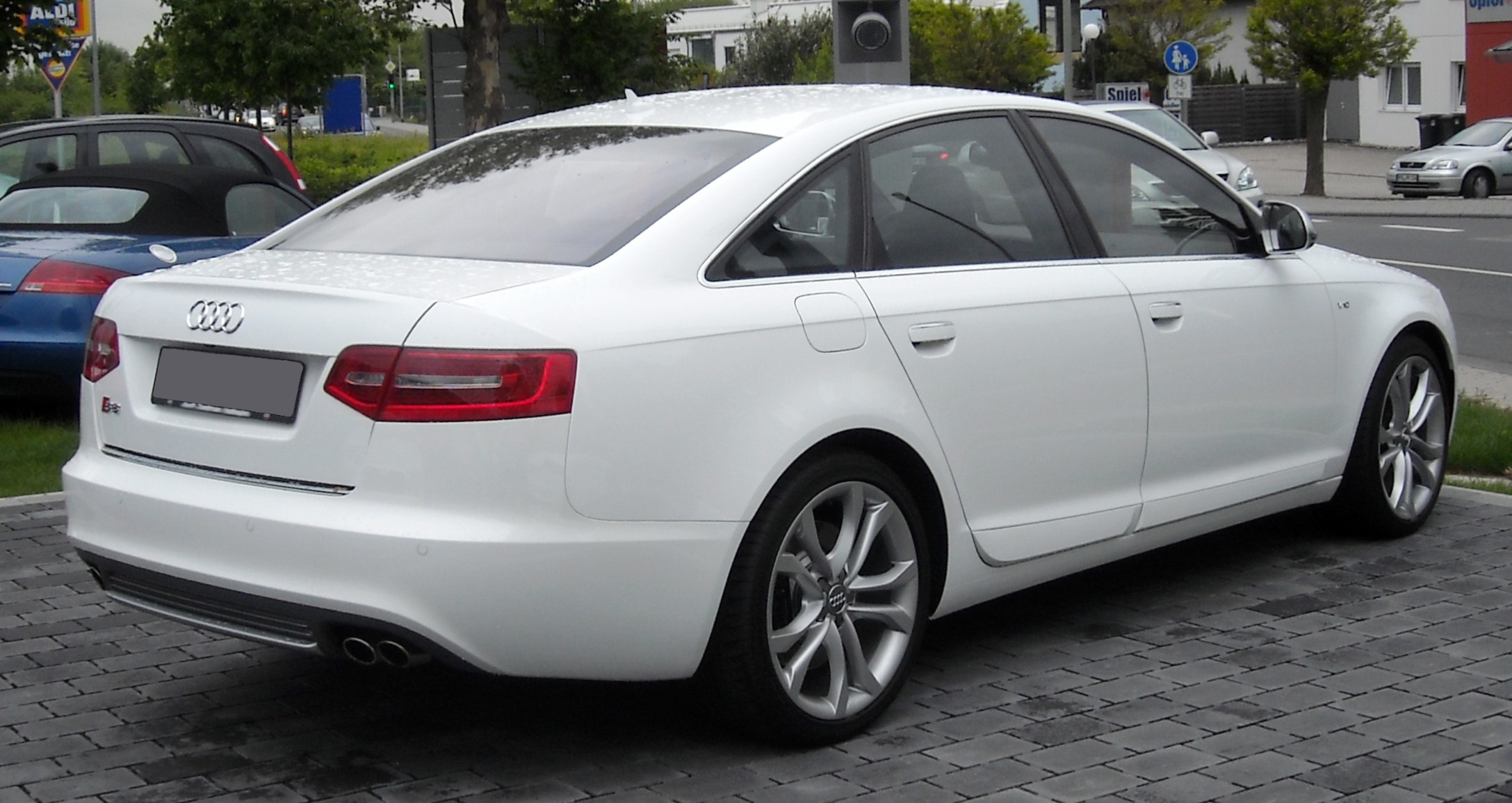
Audi S6 sedan

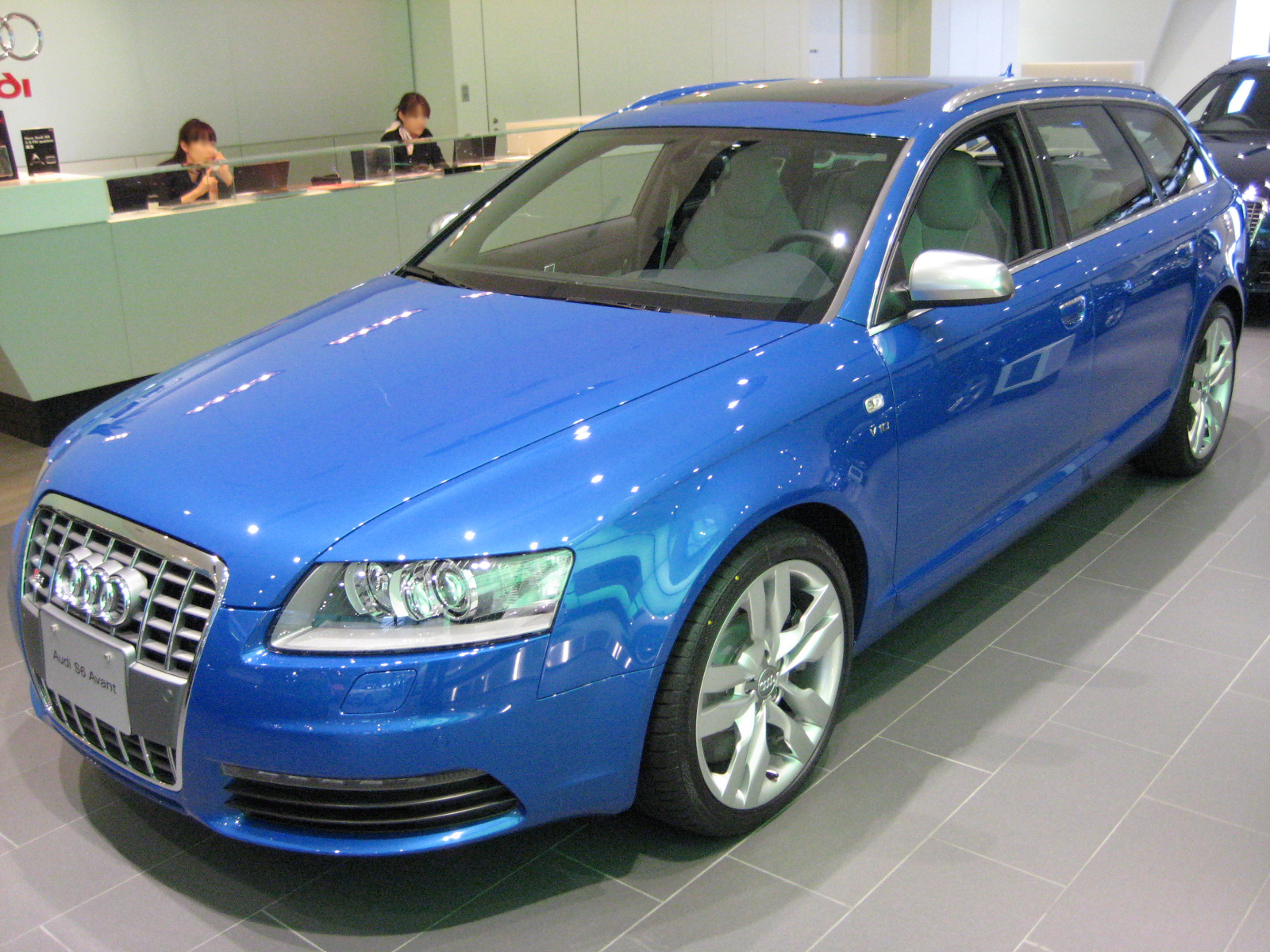
Audi S6 Avant

The Audi S6 5.2 FSI quattro (Typ 4F) was introduced at the 2006 North American International Auto Show in January.

The performance version of the C6 Audi A6, the S6 uses the Volkswagen Group C6 platform, and is available in saloon/sedan and Avant (estate/wagon) bodystyles. Factory production started in June 2006. A facelifted version of the S6 was released in late 2008 for the 2009 model year. In 2010, the S6 gained Audi's third-generation MMI electronics controller and real-time traffic information.

=== C6 powertrain ===
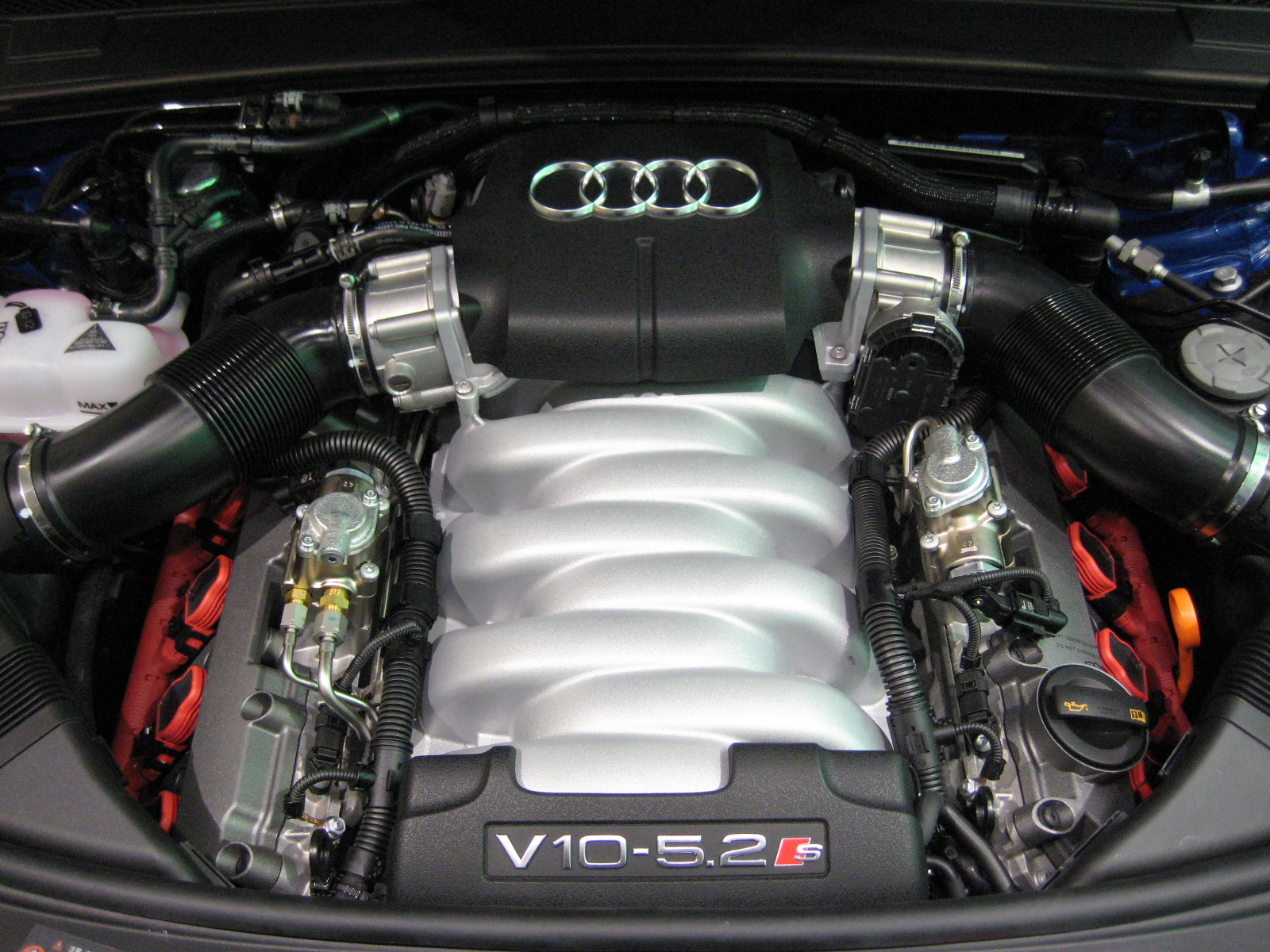
Audi C6 S6 V10 engine

The engine in the C6 S6 is an even firing all-aluminium alloy 5,204 cc (317.6 cu in) Fuel Stratified Injection (FSI) 40-valve (four valves per cylinder) 90° V10 (parts code: 07L, identification code: BXA). This engine is often referred to as a derivative of Lamborghini's 5.0-litre V10, but with longer stroke and wider bore to provide additional low end torque for use in the heavier sedan. The cylinder spacing is 90mm compared to 88mm for the Lamborghini engine. The V10 is based on the Audi 4.2-litre V8 engine. It produces 320 kW (435 PS; 429 bhp) at 6,800 rpm and 540 N⋅m (398 lbf⋅ft) of torque from 3,000 to 4,000 rpm. It uses twin chain-driven double overhead camshafts with variable valve timing for both intake and exhaust valves. The engine is managed by a Bosch Motronic MED 9.1 electronic engine control unit (ECU), which controls the mapped direct ignition, ten individual spark coils, common rail cylinder-direct sequential multi-point fuel injection, and drive-by-wire throttle.

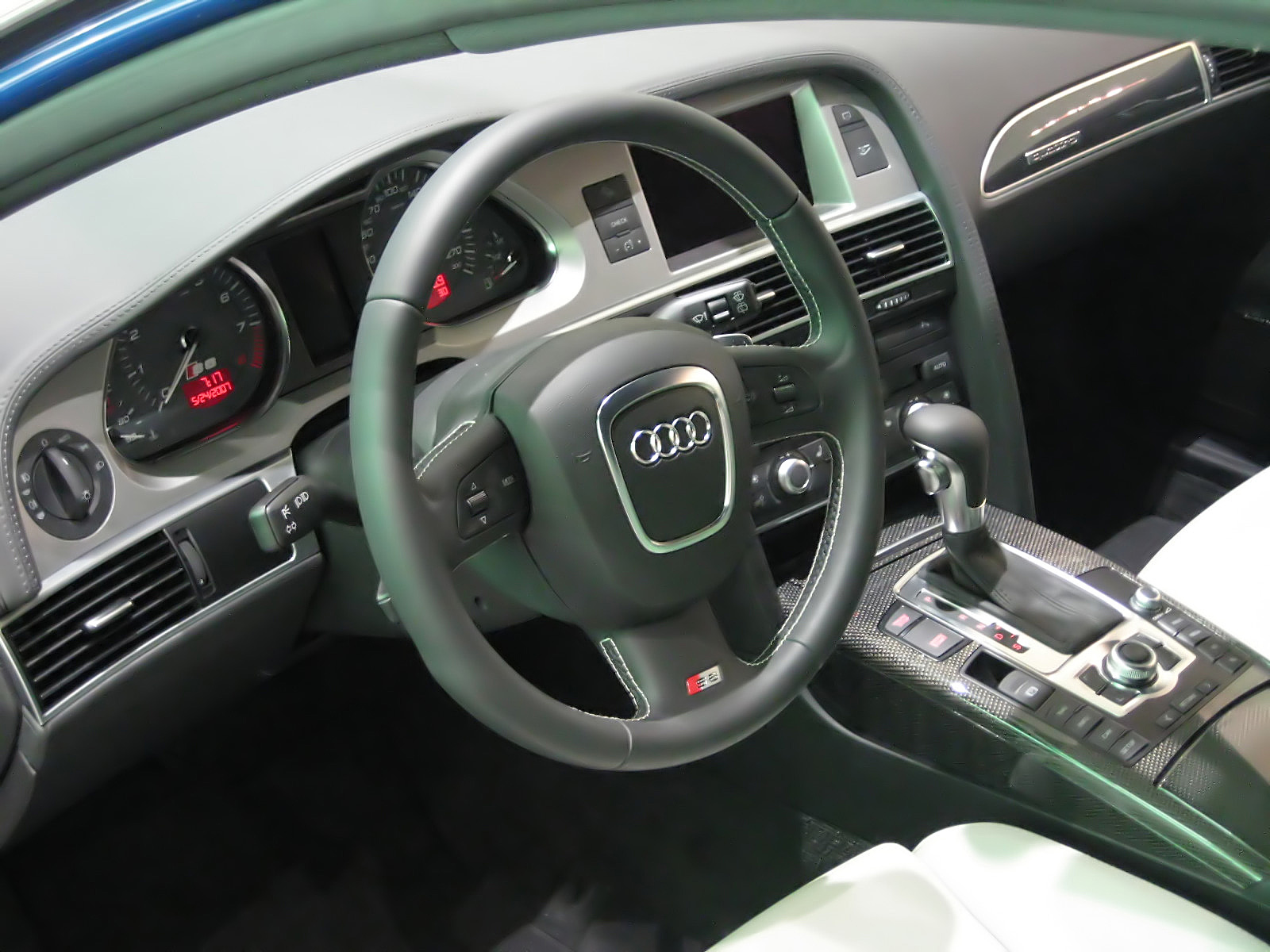
C6 S6 Avant interior

A ZF 6HP26 six-speed tiptronic automatic transmission (parts code: 09E, identification codes: JBW, JMS, KHD, JLL) (gear ratios - 1st: 4.171, 2nd: 2.340, 3rd: 1.521, 4th: 1.143, 5th: 0.867, 6th: 0.691), with steering wheel-mounted "paddle-shifters" is the only transmission available. Torsen-based quattro permanent four-wheel drive - initially with the T-1 symmetrical differential, and from 2007 model year with the latest 40:60 front:rear asymmetric/dynamic Torsen T-3 differential, is standard. The final drive ratio is 3.801. Traction is assisted "Electronic Differential Lock" (EDL) and "Anti-Slip Regulation" (ASR) (commonly known as traction control system) - both functions of the Bosch ESP 8.0 Electronic Stability Programme.

The same engine is used in the Audi D3 S8, but in a higher state of tune where it develops 331 kW (450 PS; 444 bhp), as the S6 is not to be positioned above the S8 in output. With the discontinuation of the S8 5.2 FSI after the 2009 model year and the RS 6 5.0 TFSI in late 2010, the S6 5.2 FSI and R8 5.2 FSI were the remaining Audi vehicles that have V10 engines. The S6 5.2 FSI was discontinued after the 2011 model year, shortly before the release of the 2012 Audi A6 (C7).

Acceleration from 0 to 100 km/h (62.1 mph) takes 5.2 seconds for the S6 saloon, with the quarter mile passing in 13.5 seconds. Top speed is electronically limited to 250 km/h (155.3 mph). However a test by Edmunds found that the S6 takes 5.7-seconds to reach 60 mph (97 km/h), a full second or so behind the BMW M5 and Mercedes-Benz E63 AMG (which are the S6's closest competitors in North America, since the RS6 is not sold there), and that the 2009 Audi A6 3.0 TFSI (a supercharged 3.0L V6) has almost equivalent performance to the S6 5.2 FSI. Yet, in a 2007 track test by Road & Track, the C6 S6 went from 0–60 mph (0–97 km/h) in 5.1 seconds, while it covered the quarter-mile in 13.5 seconds.

=== C6 brakes, wheels and tyres ===
The brakes consist of radially ventilated discs front and rear. The fronts are sized at 385 mm (15.16 in) in diameter by 36 mm (1.417 in) thick, and are clamped by gloss black painted Continental Teves two-piston sliding calipers. The rear discs are 330 mm (12.99 in) by 22 mm (0.866 in) thick, and use gloss black Girling-TRW single piston sliding calipers with an integrated electro-mechanical parking brake.

A Bosch ESP 8.0 Electronic Stability Programme, with Anti-lock Braking System (ABS), Brake Assist, and Electronic Brakeforce Distribution (EBD) completed the brake system.

Standard alloy wheels consist of 9Jx19" cast aluminium alloy "5-arm wing design", fitted with Continental SportContact2 265/35 ZR19 tyres. An optional 8½Jx18" cast alloy "S design" with 255/40 ZR18 tyres (either Continental SportContact2 or Bridgestone Potenza RE050A) are also available. A direct-acting Tyre Pressure Monitoring System (TPMS) is also standard.

=== C6 other features ===
The S6 features two rows of five distinctive LED daytime running lamps (DRLs) along each side of the front bumper air intakes which indicates the 10-cylinder engine as a point of differentiation from other A6 models. Bi-Xenon high-intensity discharge (HID) adaptive headlights which swivel around corners complement the LED DRLs.

=== Audi RS 6 (C6) ===
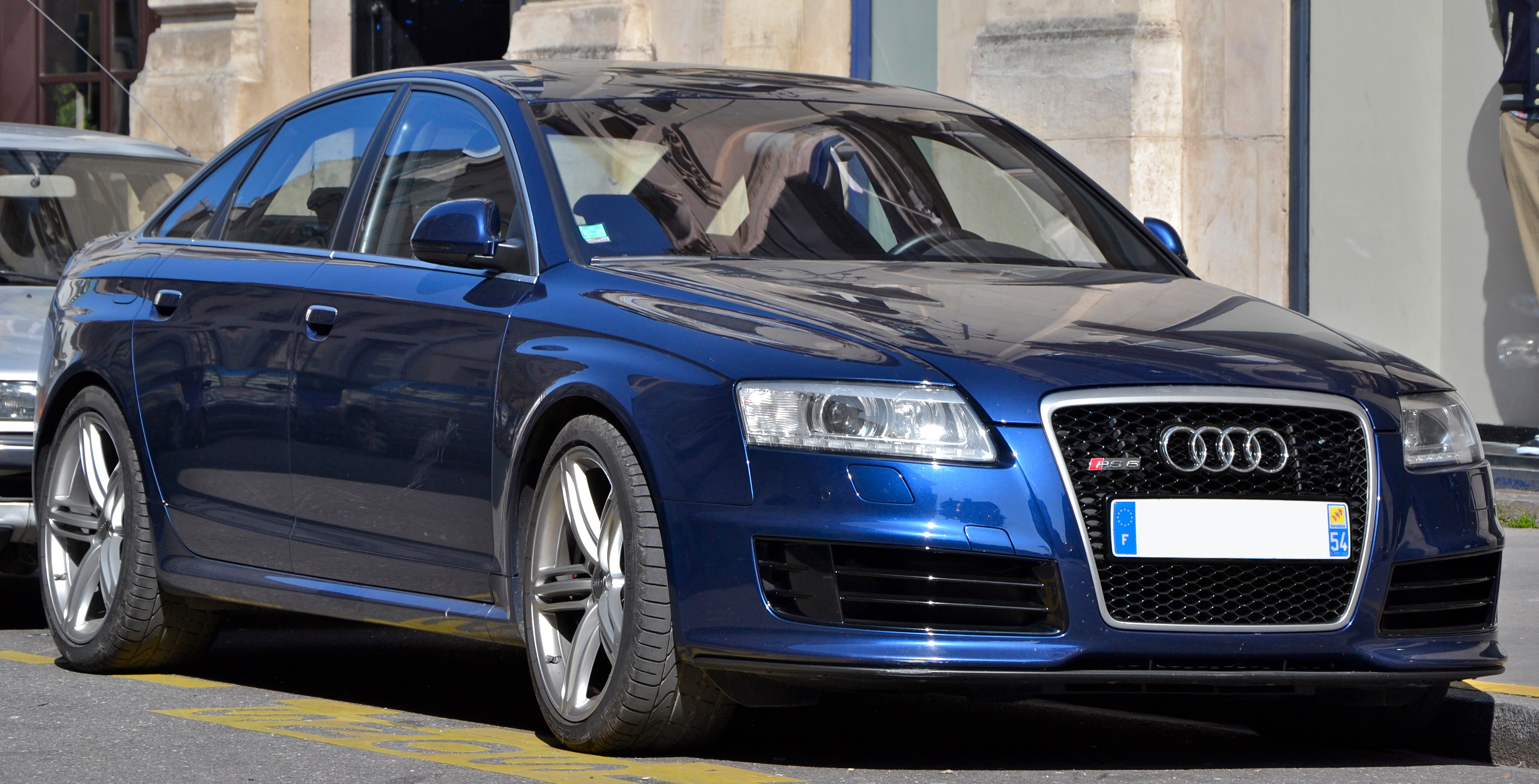
Audi RS 6 (C6) sedan

As with the previous generation, this C6 platform also generated an RS 6 version available for the model years 2008 to 2010, again developed and produced by quattro GmbH. This version of the RS6 included a 5.0-litre (4,991 cubic centimetres (304.6 cu in)) even firing 90° V10 twin-turbocharged ("biturbo"), Fuel Stratified Injection (FSI) V10 engine, which produced 580 PS (427 kW; 572 bhp) and 650 N⋅m (479 lb⋅ft). Available in both Avant and saloon bodystyles, it was Audi's single most powerful car. Official performance figures for acceleration from 0-100 km/h (62.1 mph) are 4.6 seconds for the Avant and 4.5 seconds for the saloon.

== C7 (Typ 4G, 2012–2018) ==
Fourth generation (C7/4G)
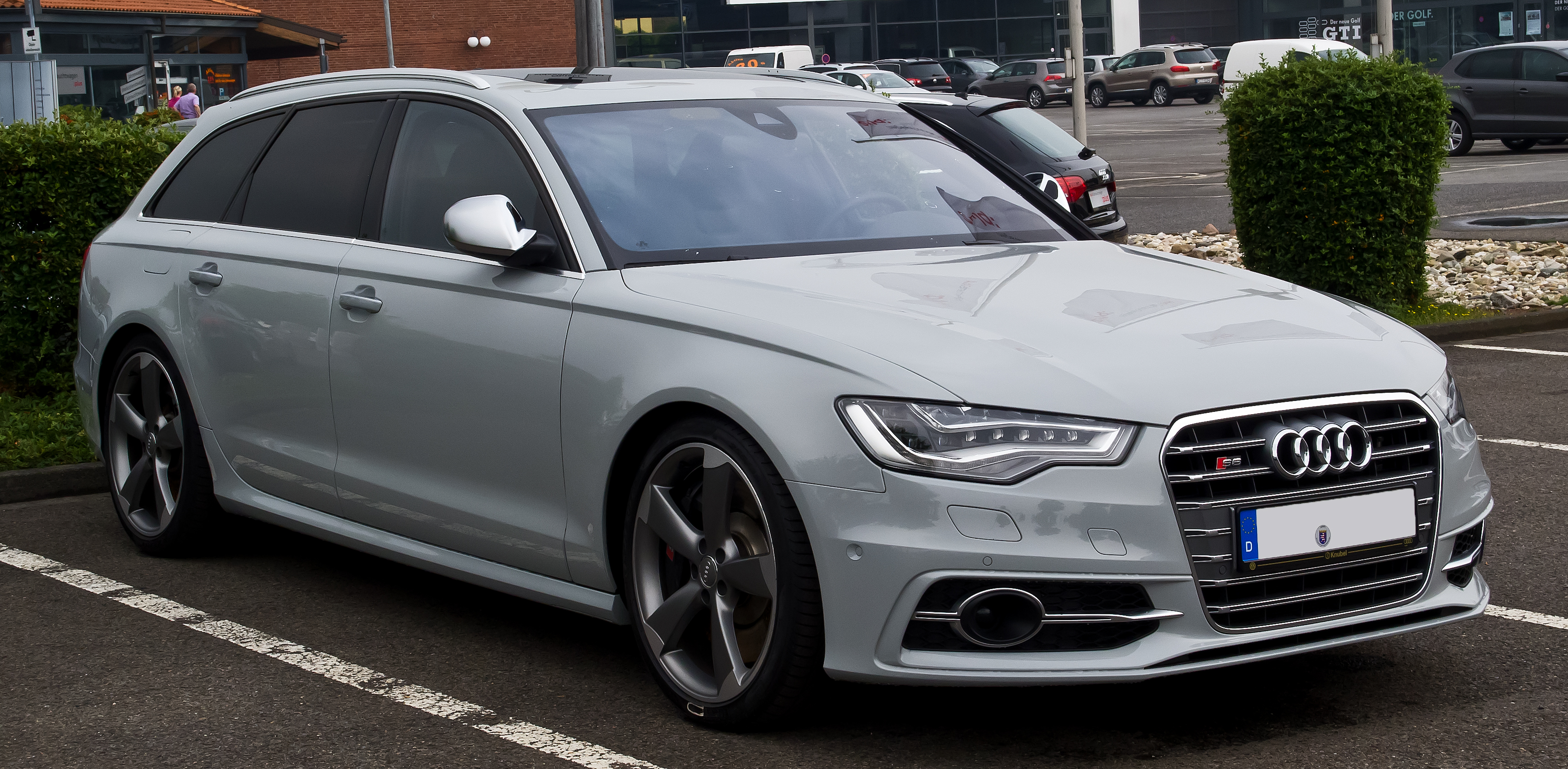
- Audi S6 Avant (C7)

Overview
- Production: 2012–2018

Body and chassis
- Body style: 4-door sedan, 5-door Avant (estate/wagon)
- Platform: Volkswagen Group C7
- Related: Audi C7 A6

Powertrain
- Engine: 4.0 L V8 DOHC Biturbo
- Transmission: 7-speed dual-clutch transmission S tronic

Dimensions
- Wheelbase: 114.7 in (2,913 mm)
- Length: 195.9 in (4,976 mm); 4,942 mm (195 in) (Avant)
- Width: 75.8 in (1,925 mm)
- Height: 56.4 in (1,433 mm); 1,436 mm (57 in) (Avant)

The Audi S6 4.0 TFSI quattro and its mechanical twin S7 were launched as a 2013 models, a year after the C7 Audi A6 and Audi A7 were released.

The Audi S6 and S7 are powered by a 4.0L DOHC twin-turbo V8 engine mated to a 7-speed S-tronic Double Clutch Gearbox. This engine makes 420 PS (414 hp; 309 kW) and 406 lb⋅ft (550 N⋅m) of torque, plus there is a cylinder-on-demand system and a stop-start system for improved fuel economy. This was later upgraded to 450 PS (444 hp; 331 kW) for 2016. The 2013 Audi A8 shares the same engine, while the 2012 Audi S8 has a variant of the powerplant in a higher state of tune making 520 PS (513 hp; 382 kW) and 479 lb⋅ft (649 N⋅m) of torque, both mated to an 8-speed automatic transmission. Higher output versions of this 4.0L DOHC twin-turbo V8 engine are found in the 2013 Audi RS6, 2013 Audi RS7, and 2016 Audi S8 Plus.

The V8 performance option for the regular Audi A6, found in the 2004-11 Audi A6 4.2 FSI, was discontinued and the S6 took over as the engine upgrade. The S6 thus compared more closely with the BMW 550i and Mercedes-Benz E550, which also used twin-turbo V8 engines and had available all-wheel drive.

UK sales began in May, with a starting price of £53,995 for the saloon, and £56,050 for the Avant.

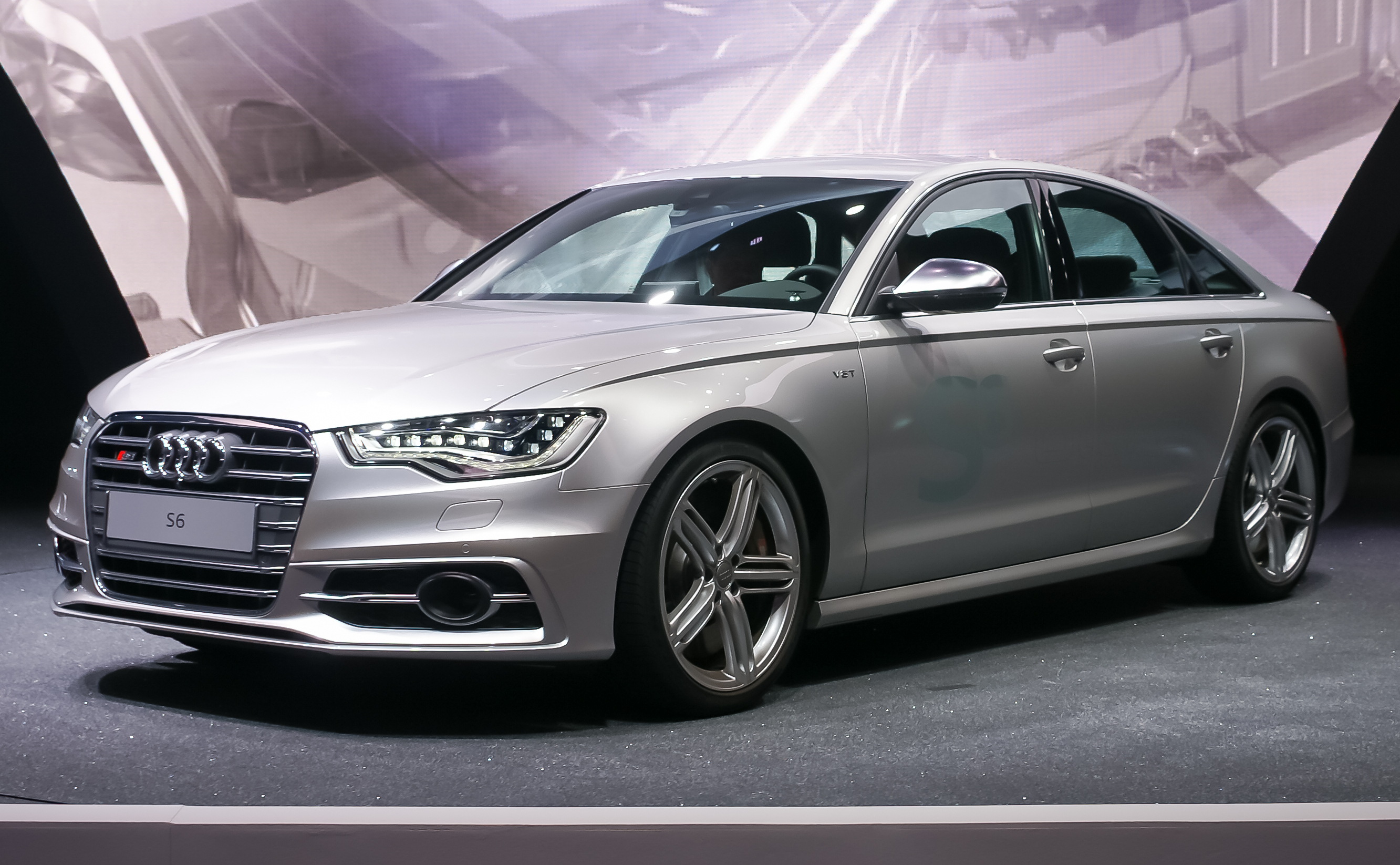
Audi S6 (C7) Front

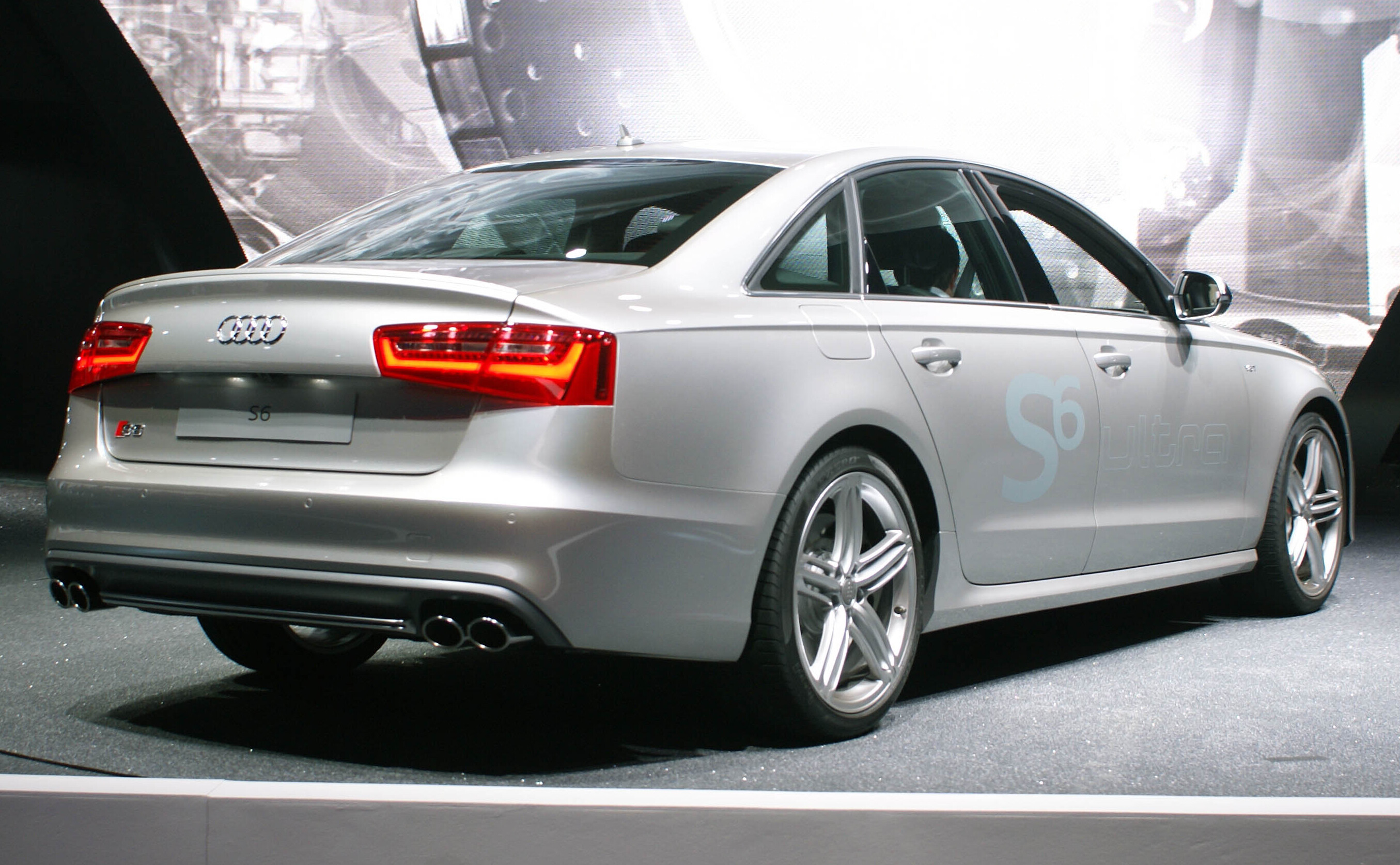
Audi S6 (C7) Rear

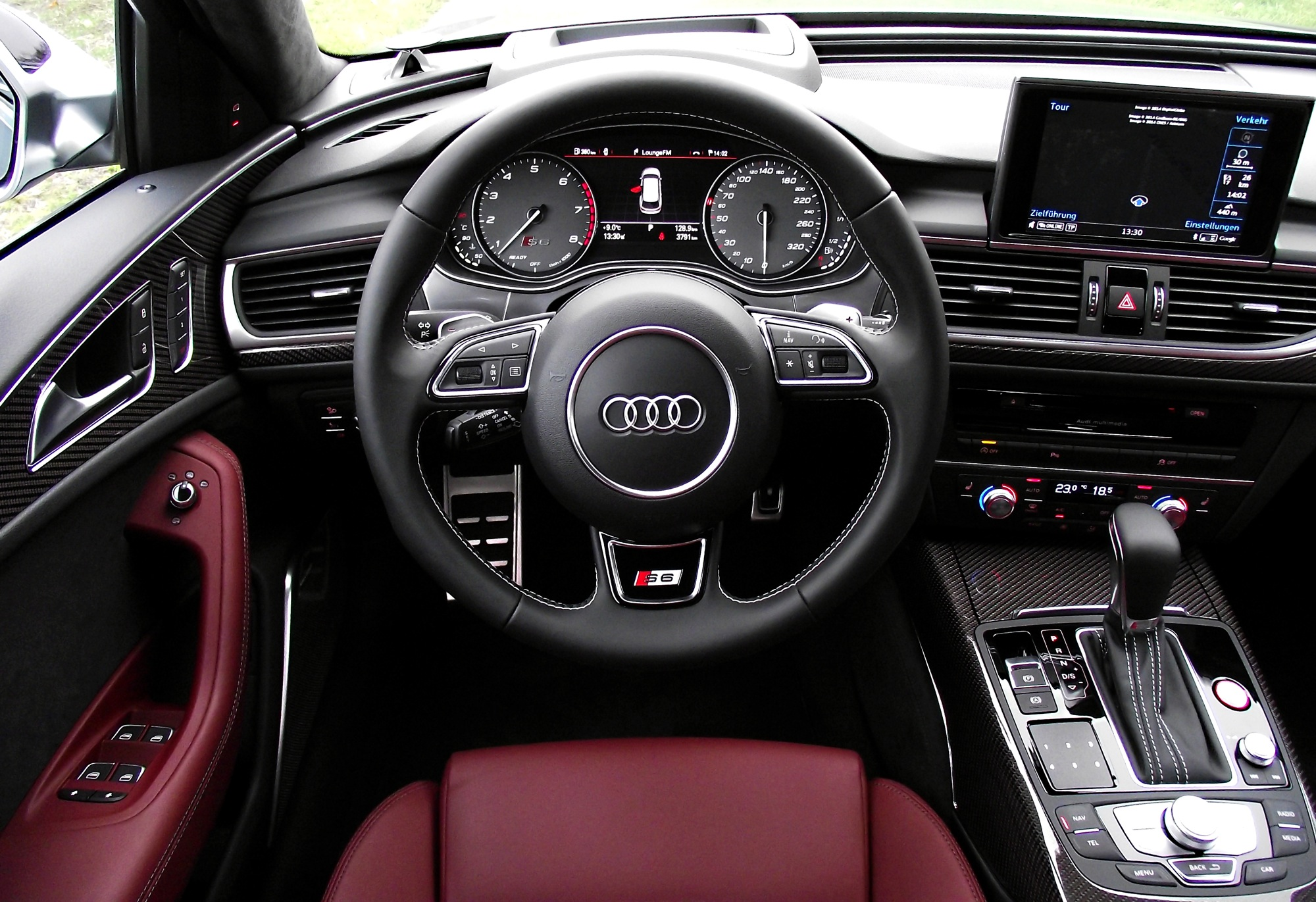
Interior

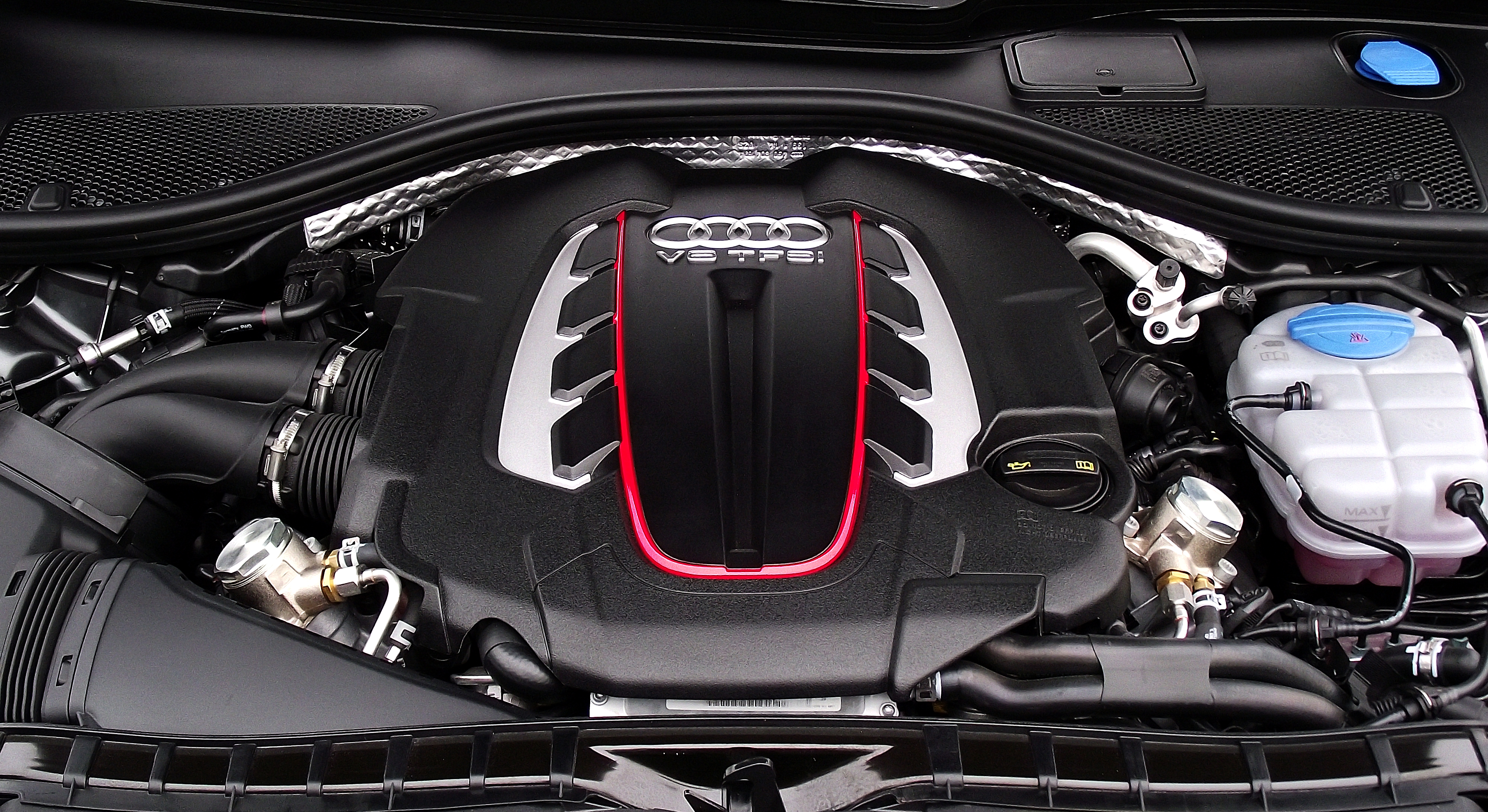
Engine bay

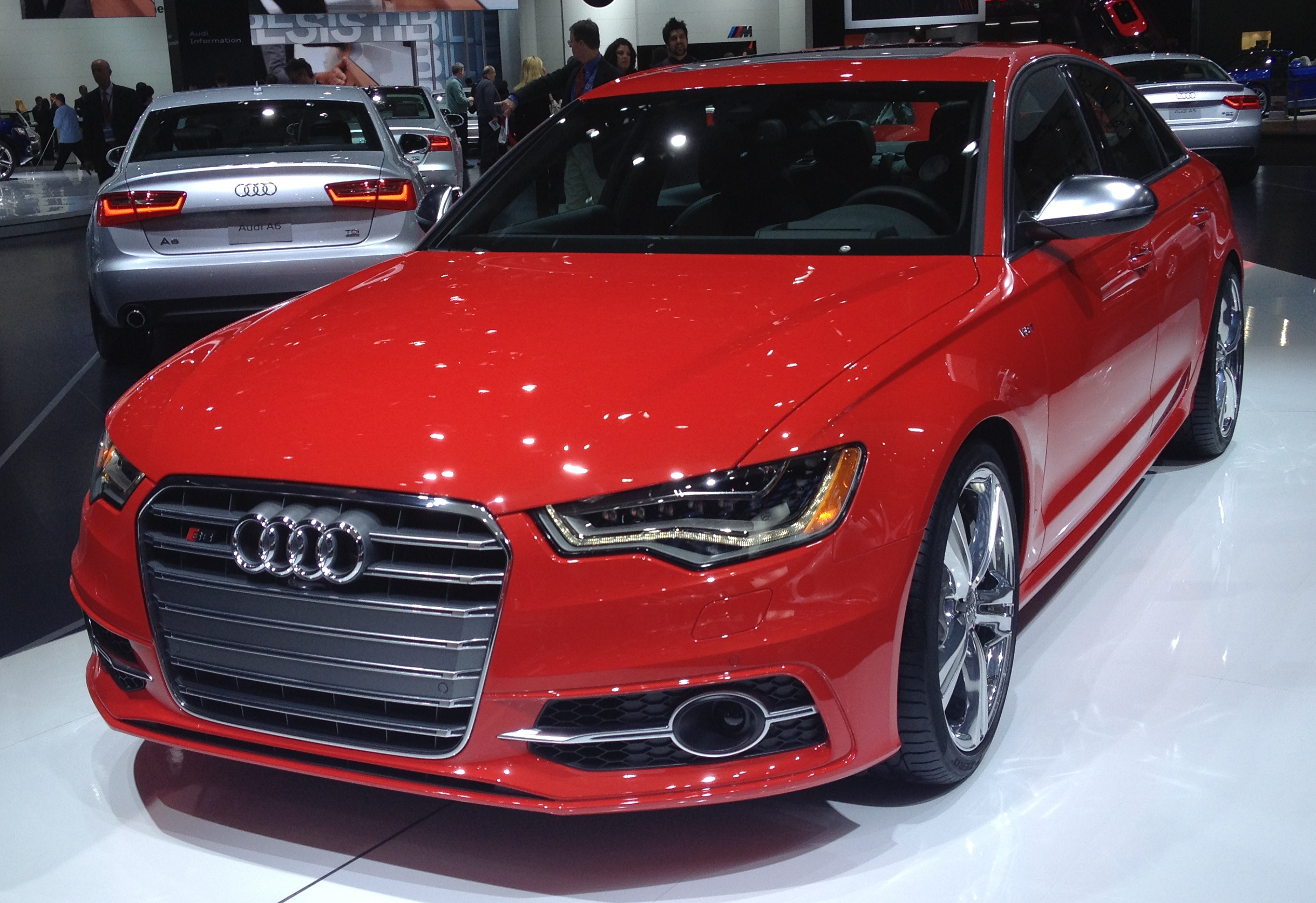
S6 with adaptive cruise control radars

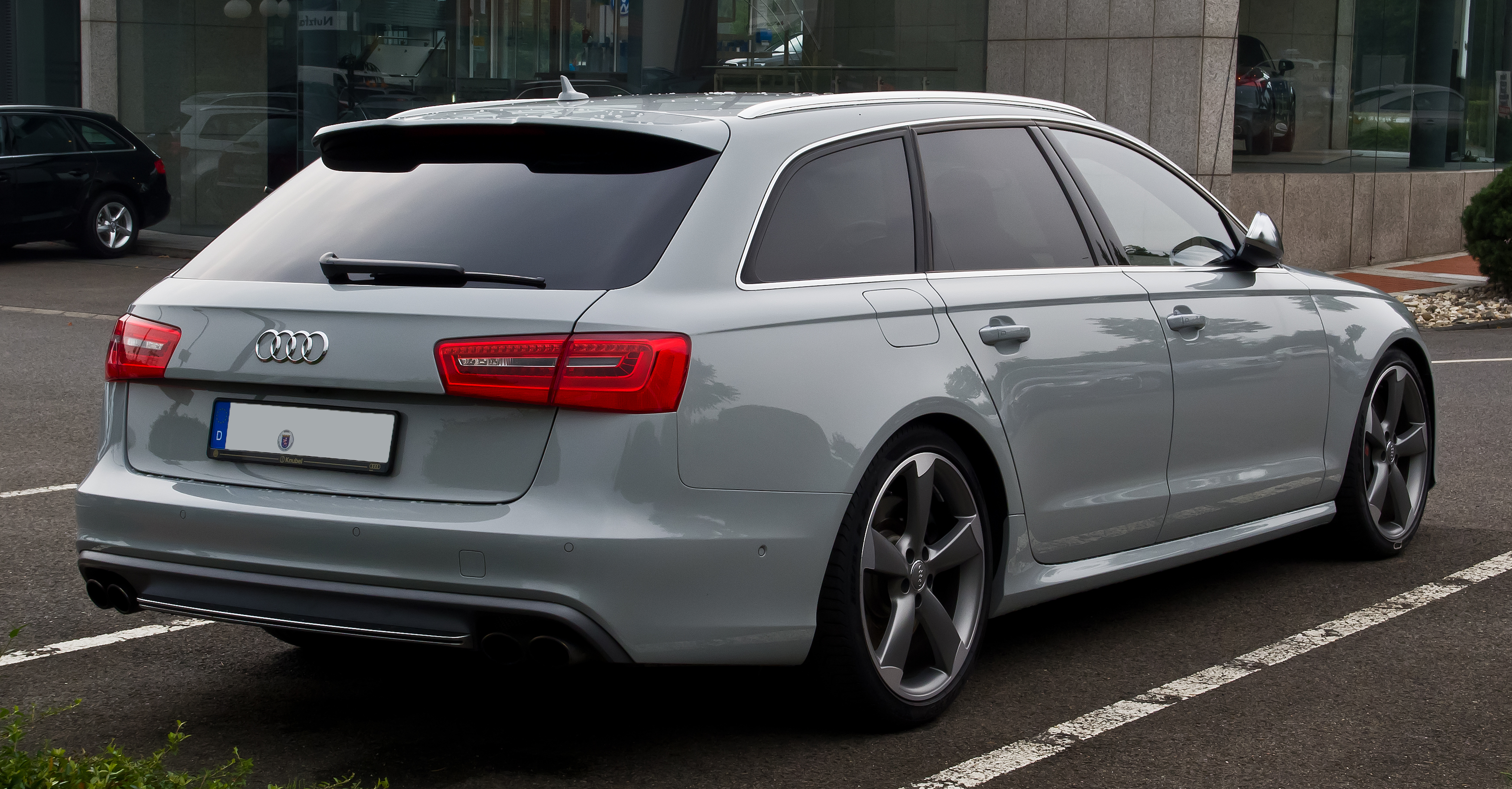
Audi S6 Avant (C7)

=== C7.5 (2015 facelift) ===
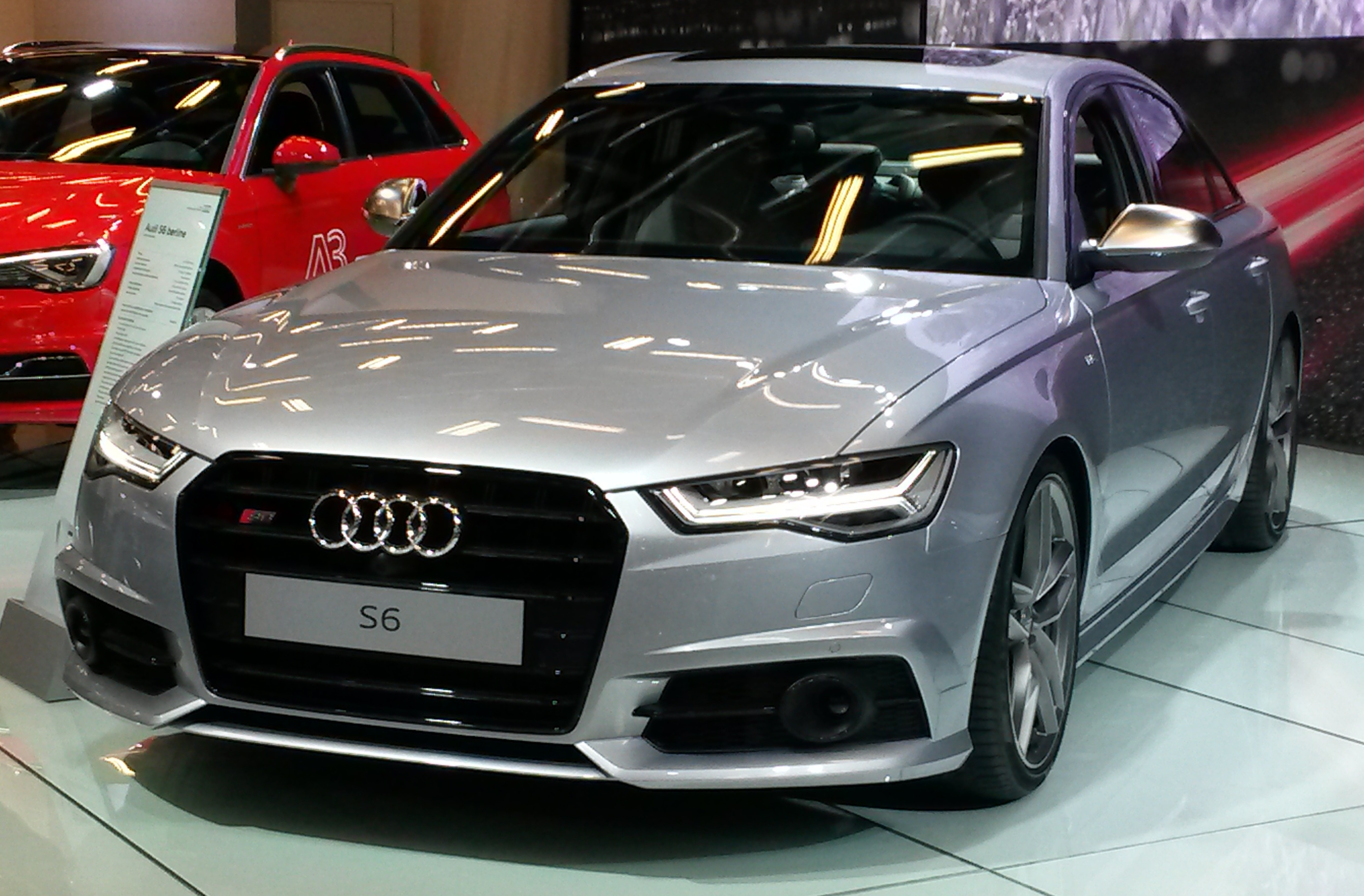
S6 with updated lights (2015 update)

Audi unveiled the 2015 S6 facelift in November 2014. Changes include:

- Styling tweaks to the car's exterior, engine line-up, transmission.
- Latest Multi Media Interface modular infotainment platform (faster Nvidia Tegra 3 processor, improved graphics) including handwriting recognition.
- Audi connect telematics with 4G mobile internet (and mobile updates for the navigation map).
- Adaptive glare-free Matrix LED headlights.
- Improved Night Vision Assistant can now recognize animals.
- Both TFSI and all three TDI engines now meet the Euro 6 emission standard.

== C8 (Typ 4K, 2019–2025) ==
Fifth generation (C8)
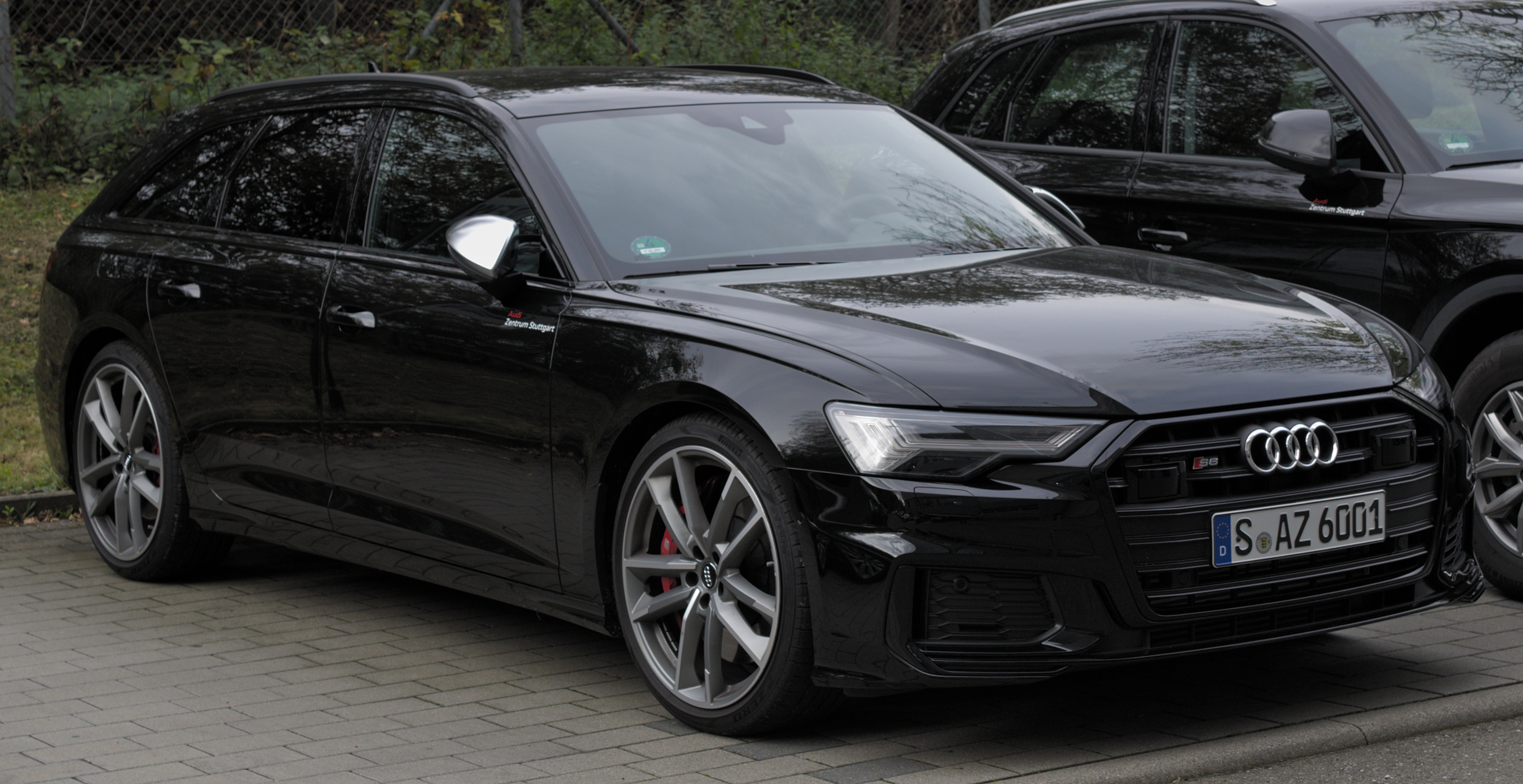
- Audi S6 Avant (C8)

Overview
- Production: 2018–2025

Body and chassis
- Body style: 4-door sedan, 5-door Avant (estate/wagon)
- Platform: MLB Evo
- Related: Audi C8 A6

Powertrain
- Engine: 3.0 L V6 Turbo diesel (Europe); 2.9 L V6 Twin-Turbo petrol (outside Europe)
- Transmission: 8-speed automatic Tiptronic

Dimensions
- Length: 4,954 mm (195.0 in)
- Width: 1,886 mm (74.3 in)
- Height: 1,445 mm (56.9 in)
- Kerb weight: 2,035 kg (4,486.4 lb)

Chronology
- Predecessor: S6 C7

The Audi S6 C8 is powered by a 2.9 litre twin-turbo V6 TFSI gasoline engine, producing 331 kW (450 PS; 444 bhp) and 600 N⋅m (443 lbf⋅ft) of torque, allowing the car to reach 60 mph in 4.4 seconds. The engine is boosted by a 48V belt alternator/starter mild-hybrid system, which can recover up to 9.4 bhp (7 kW).

European models went on sale in summer 2019 and feature a 3.0 litre turbo-diesel V6 producing 253 kW (344 PS; 339 bhp) and 700 N⋅m (516 lbf⋅ft) of torque, allowing the car to accelerate from 0 to 60 mph (97 km/h) in 5.1 seconds. The car has a drag coefficient of 0.29.

Both engines feature an electric supercharger or compressor, originally debuted on a diesel powered V8 in the 2016 Audi SQ7 TDI. The 2.9 TFSI is the only Audi AG petrol engine known to have an electric supercharger.

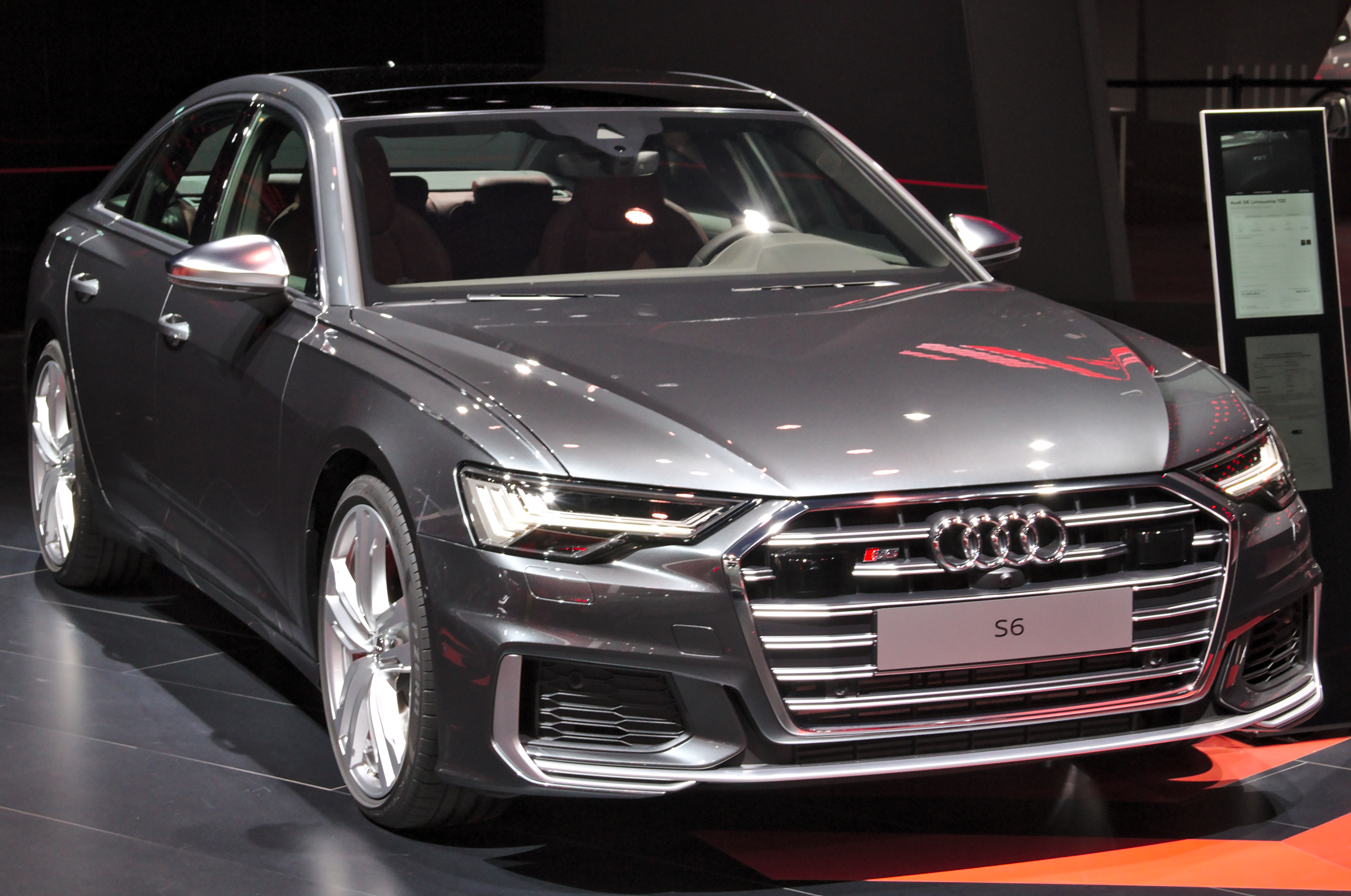
Audi S6 front

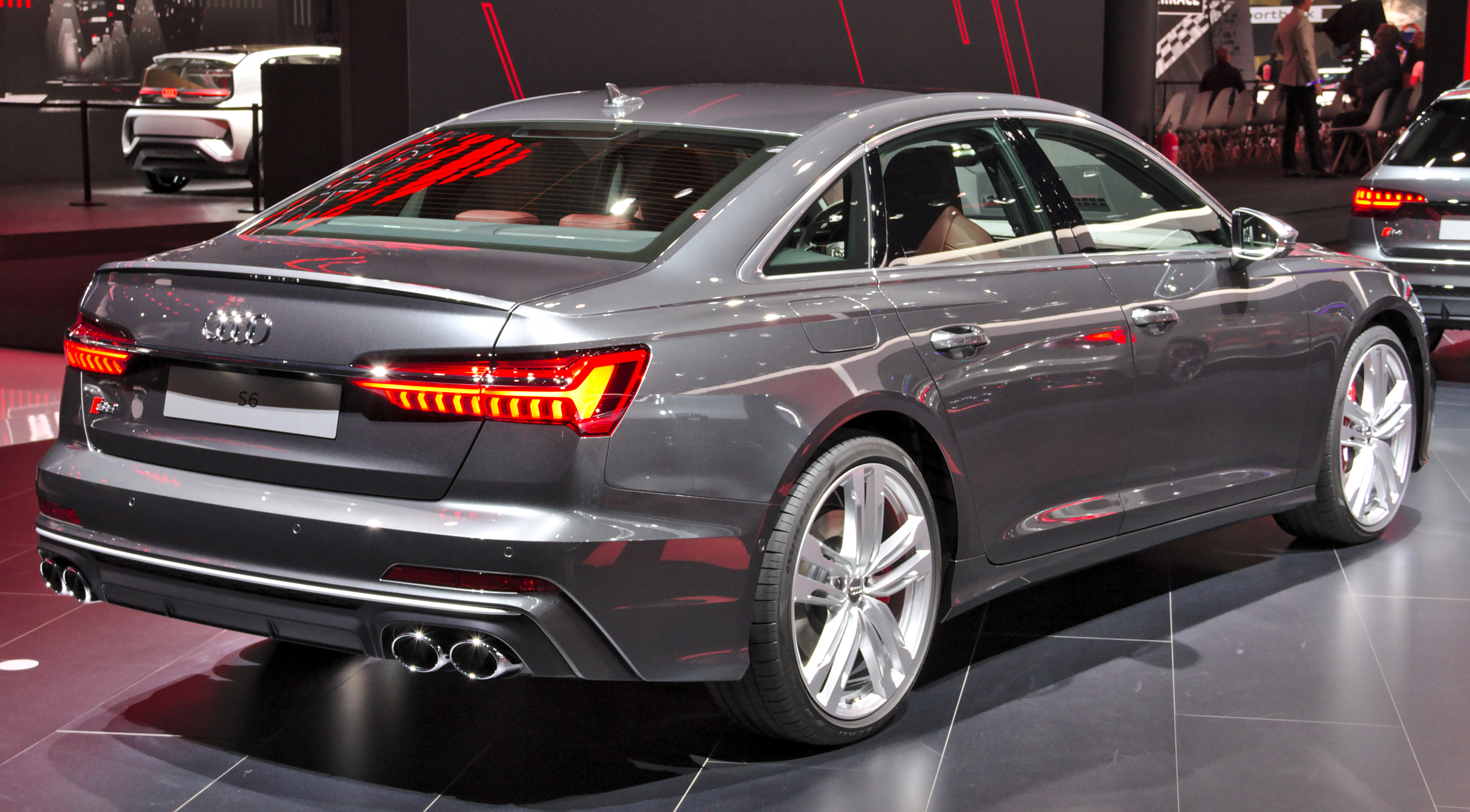
Audi S6 rear

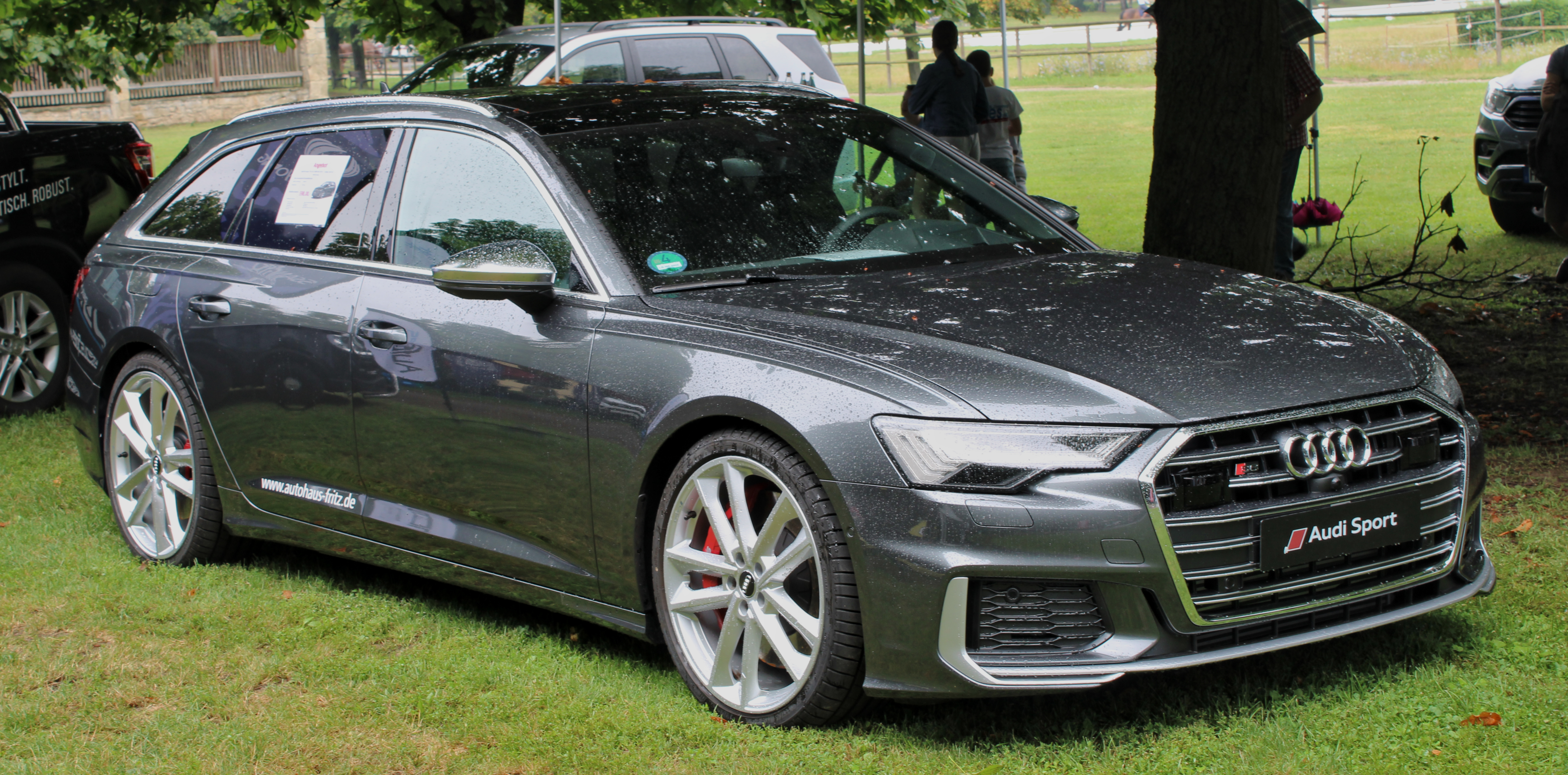
Audi S6 Avant front

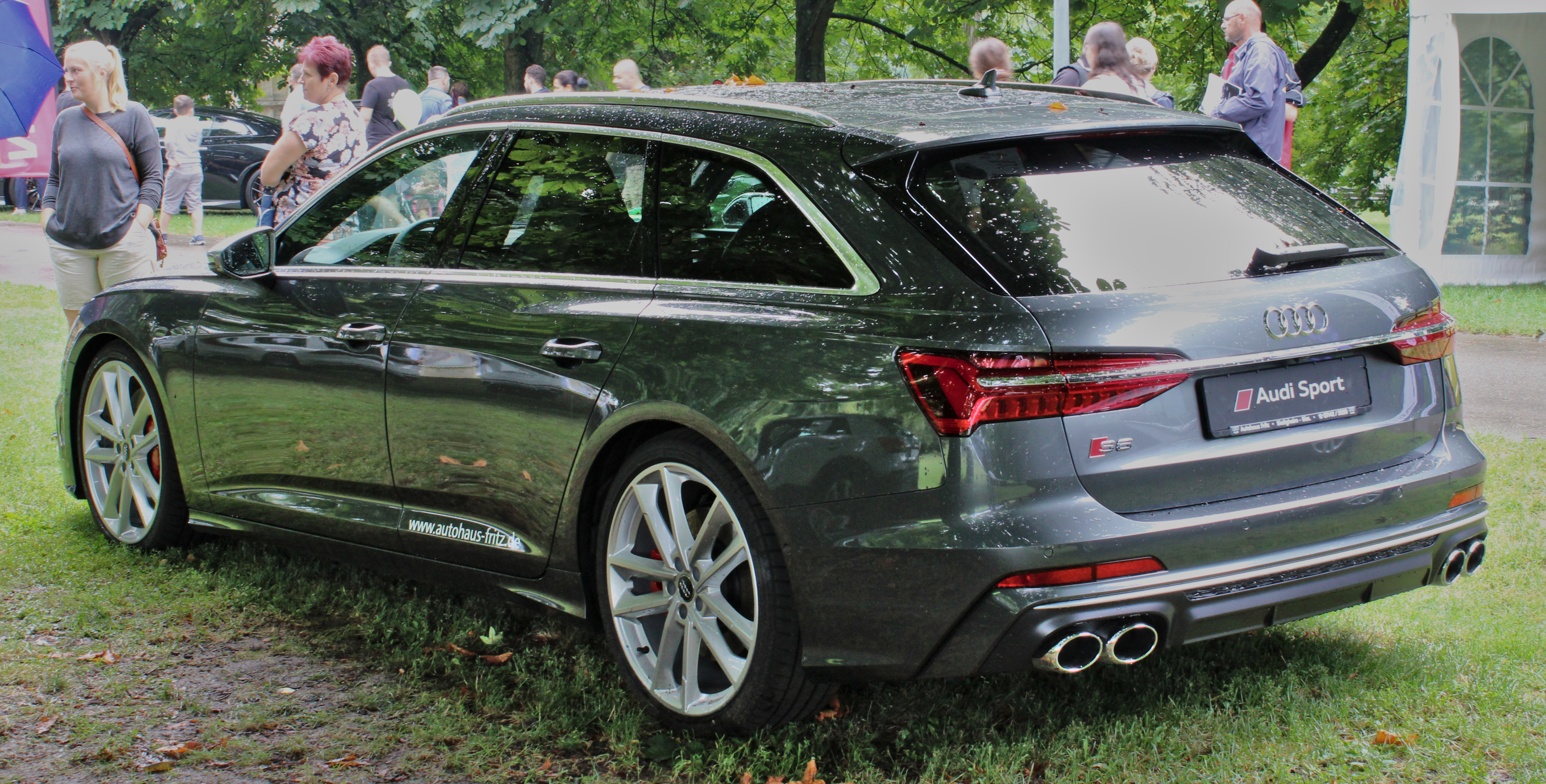
Audi S6 Avant rear

== See also ==
- Audi S and RS models
