= Audi A8 =

Full-size luxury sedan

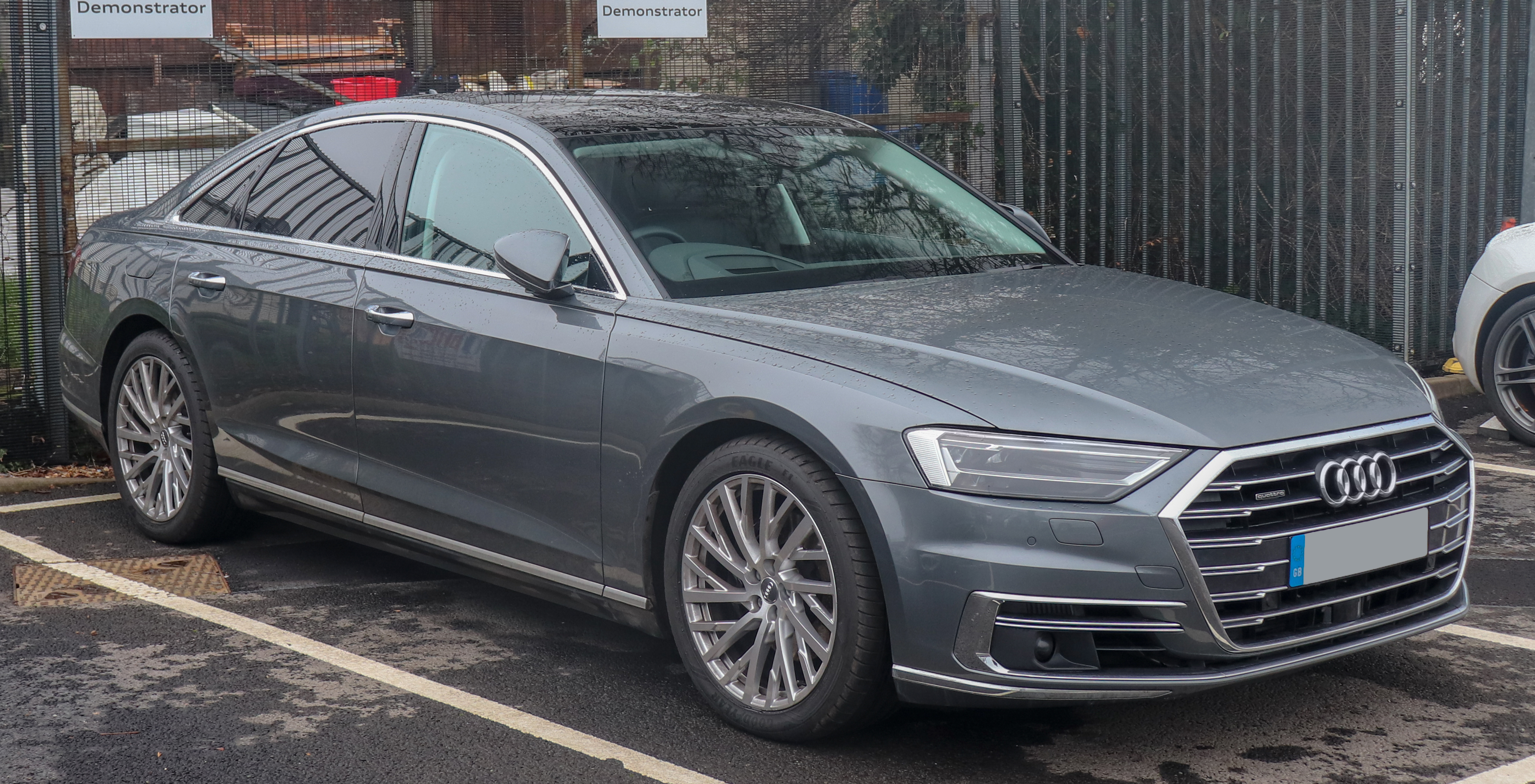

Overview
- Manufacturer: Audi AG
- Production: D2: 1994–2002; D3: 2002–2010; D4: 2009–2017; D5: 2017–2026
- Assembly: Germany: Neckarsulm (Neckarsulm Audi Factory)

Body and chassis
- Class: Full-size luxury car (F)
- Body style: 4-door saloon
- Layout: Longitudinal FF (1994–2013) / F4 layout (quattro) (1994–2026)
- Platform: MLB
- Related: Audi S8

Chronology
- Predecessor: Audi V8

The Audi A8 is a full-size luxury sedan manufactured and marketed by the German automaker Audi from 1994 to 2026. Succeeding the Audi V8, and produced through four generations, the A8 has been offered with either front- or permanent all-wheel drive and in short- and long-wheelbase variants. The first two generations employed the Volkswagen Group D platform, with the current generation deriving from the MLB platform. After the original model's 1994 release, Audi released the second generation in late 2002, the third in late 2009, and the fourth and current iteration in 2017. Noted as the first mass-market car with an aluminium chassis, all A8 models have used this construction method co-developed with Alcoa and marketed as the Audi Space Frame.

A mechanically upgraded, high-performance version of the A8 debuted in 1996 as the Audi S8. Produced exclusively at Audi's Neckarsulm plant, the S8 is fitted standard with Audi's quattro all-wheel drive system. The S8 was only offered with a short-wheelbase for the first three generations, being joined by a long-wheelbase variant for the fourth generation.

In March 2026, reports stated that Audi had stopped taking new A8 orders in Germany from 18 February 2026, signaling the wind down of the current D5 generation. At the time, Audi has confirmed a successor is in the works, and availability in other markets was reported to depend on remaining inventory. The development followed broader reports that Audi was shifting strategic focus toward SUVs and electric vehicles.

== D2 (Typ 4D; 1994) ==
First generation (D2/4D)
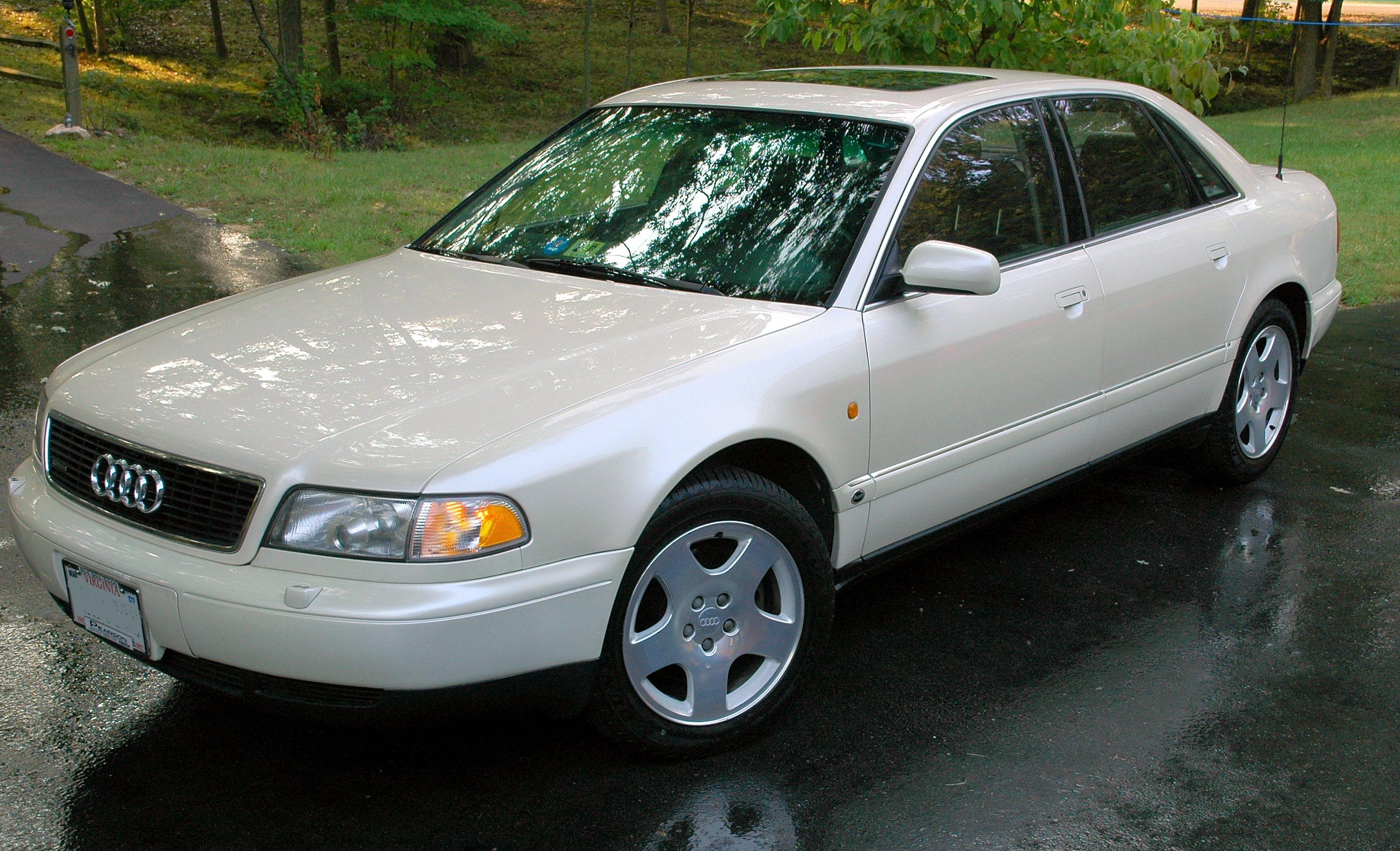
- Pre-facelift Audi A8 4.2 quattro (US)

Overview
- Production: June 1994 – 4 August 2002
- Model years: 1995–2002 (Worldwide); 1997–2002 (US)
- Assembly: Germany: Neckarsulm
- Designer: Chris Bird; Dirk van Braeckel (1990, 1991)

Body and chassis
- Platform: Volkswagen Group D2 ("Audi Space Frame")

Powertrain
- Engine: Petrol engines: 2.8 L AAH SOHC V6; 2.8 L ALG/AMX 30v V6; 3.7 L AEW V8; 4.2 L ABZ/AHC V8; 6.0 L W12; Diesel engines: 2.5 L TDI V6; 3.3 L TDI V8
- Transmission: Manual transmission: 5-speed manual; 6-speed manual; Automatic transmission: 4-speed ZF 4HP24 automatic; 5-speed ZF 5HP19 automatic; 5-speed ZF 5HP24 automatic

Dimensions
- Wheelbase: SWB: 2,882 mm (113.5 in); LWB: 3,010 mm (118.5 in)
- Length: SWB: 5,034 mm (198.2 in); LWB: 5,164 mm (203.3 in)
- Width: 1,880 mm (74.0 in)
- Height: 1,438 mm (56.6 in)
- Kerb weight: 2.5: 1,630 kg (3,594 lb) (TDI); 2.5: 1,735 kg (3,825 lb) (TDI AWD); 3.3: 1,860 kg (4,101 lb) (TDI AWD); 2.8: 1,540 kg (3,395 lb); 3.7: 1,645 kg (3,627 lb); 3.7: 1,725 kg (3,803 lb) (AWD); 4.2: 1,750 kg (3,858 lb) (AWD); 4.2: 1,845 kg (4,068 lb) (US); 4.2: 1,790 kg (3,946 lb) (AWD A8L); 4.2: 1,885 kg (4,156 lb) (US); 6.0: 1,950 kg (4,299 lb); 6.0: 1,980 kg (4,365 lb) (AWD A8L); S8: 1,730 kg (3,814 lb); S8: 1,845 kg (4,068 lb) (US)

=== Development ===
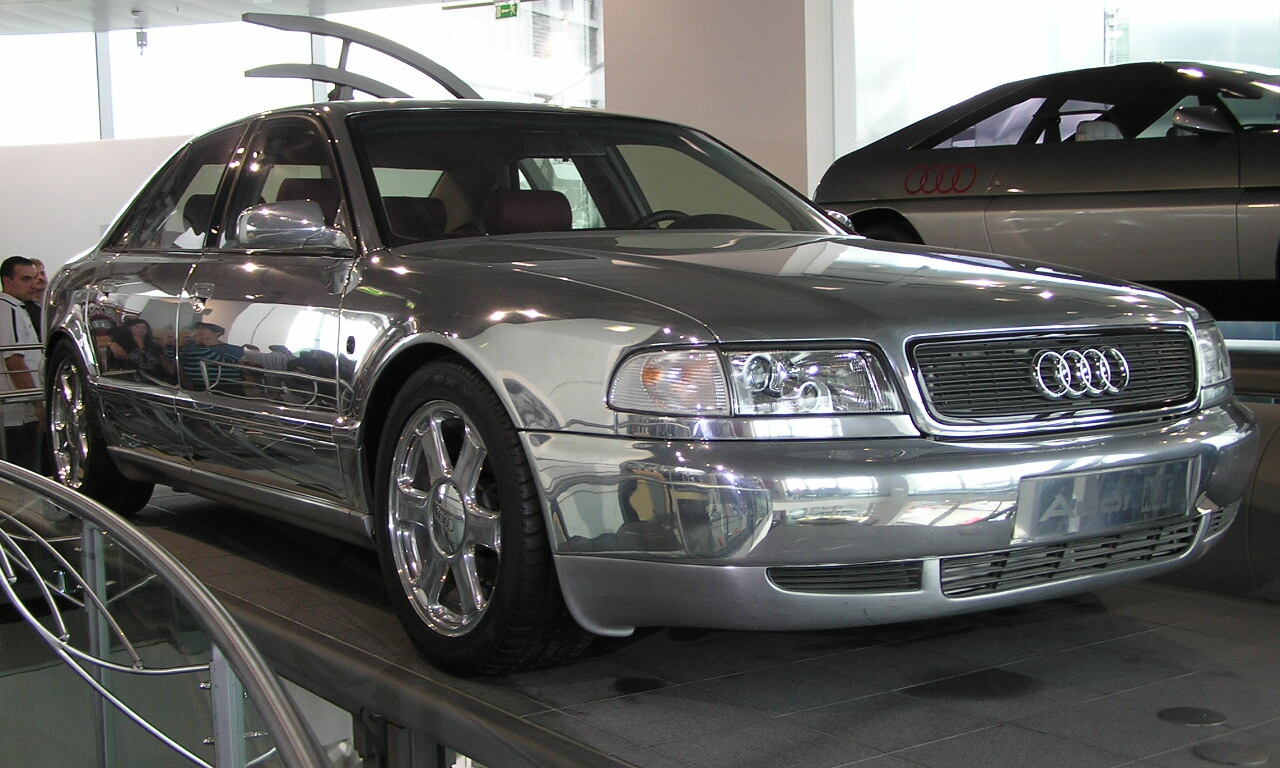
Audi Space Frame concept car

In 1982, Ferdinand Piëch signed an agreement with Aluminum Company of America. The objective was to design and develop a car that would be substantially lighter than any other vehicles in its class (to compensate for the fact that standard all-wheel drive was around 100 kg (220 lb) heavier than competitors' rear-wheel drive). In the late 1980s, it was decided that the target vehicle would be a successor to the V8 (Typ 4C) flagship introduced in 1988. By 1990, a final design by Chris Bird and Dirk van Braeckel was chosen and frozen for series production in mid-1991. In September 1993, the Audi Space Frame (ASF) Concept was unveiled at the 1993 Frankfurt Motor Show (IAA) as a D2 Typ 4D prototype in polished aluminium. Pilot production began in December 1993 and development ended in early 1994, at a total cost of $700 million (£418.1 million).

=== Introduction ===
The Audi A8 (Typ 4D) was presented in February 1994 and debuted at the 1994 Geneva Auto Show in March, with full-scale factory production commencing in June 1994, although it was not until October 1996, for the 1997 model year that it became available in North America. Unlike its predecessor, the Audi V8 model, which was built on an existing steel platform, the A8 debuted on the then-new Volkswagen Group D2 platform, an all aluminium monocoque, marketed as the "Audi Space Frame" (ASF), which helped to reduce weight and preserve structural rigidity. The saloon/sedan was offered in both the A8 (standard wheelbase), and the A8 L extended or long-wheelbase (LWB) version. The A8 L adds 5 inches (127 mm) of rear legroom. Updates to the car in 1997 included the addition of six interior airbags. The A8 was designed as a competitor to fellow German rivals Mercedes Benz S Class and the BMW 7 Series. It also competed against the British Jaguar XJ and the Japanese Lexus LS.

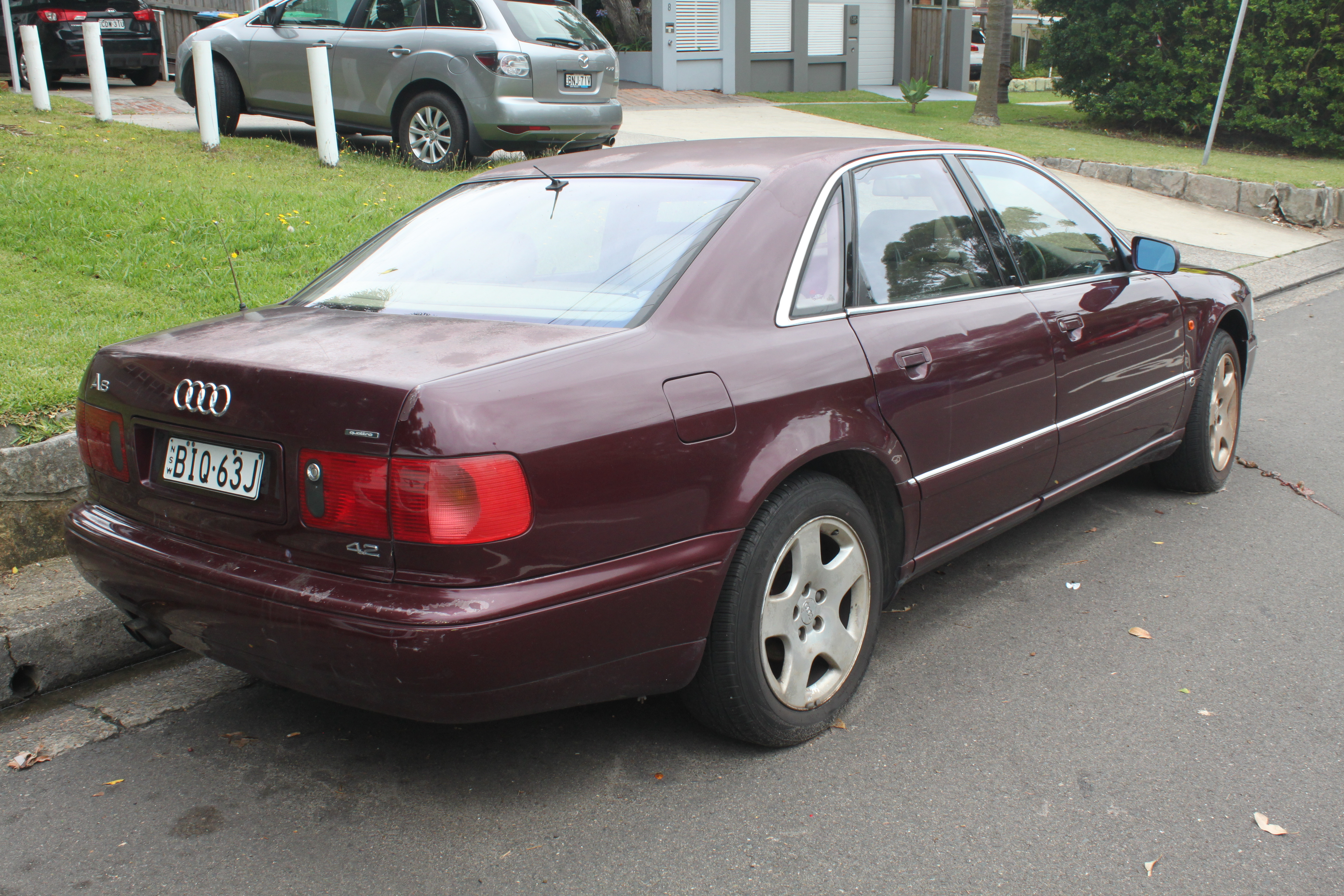
Pre-facelift Audi A8 4.2 quattro

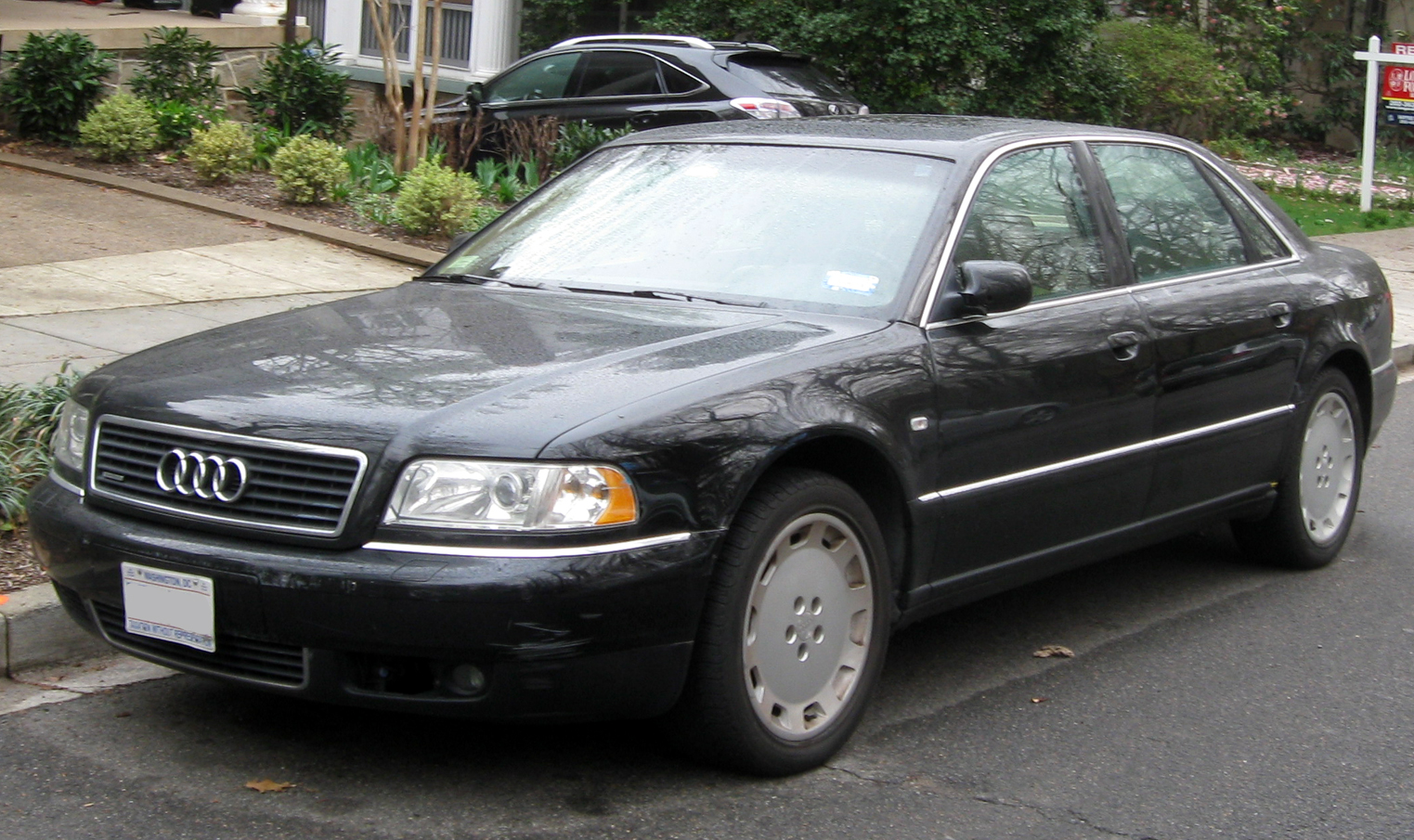
Facelift Audi A8 L 4.2 quattro (US)

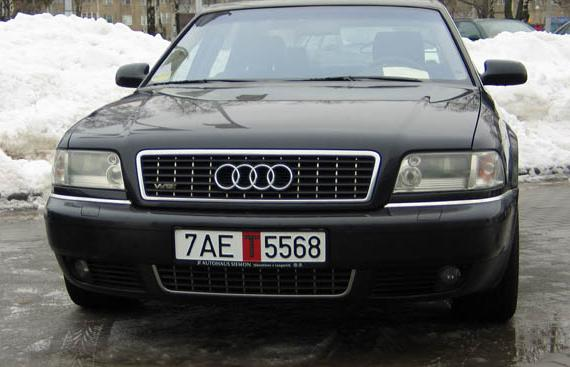
Audi A8 L W12

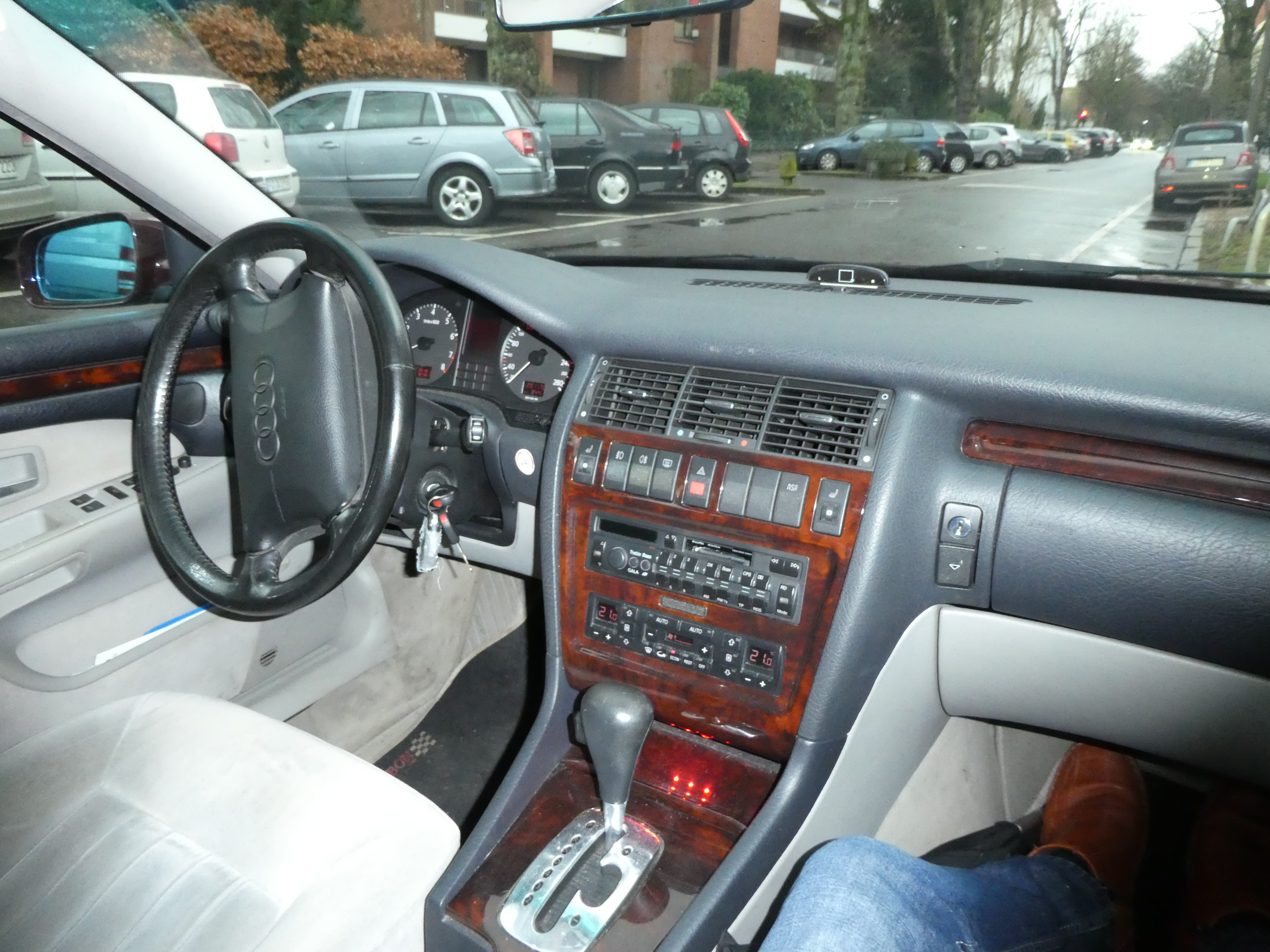
1995 Audi A8 interior

In 1997, Audi introduced the first series production electronic stability control (ESP) for all-wheel drive vehicles (Audi A8 and Audi A6)– the world's first production cars with both front and rear side airbags.

For 1997, the new A8 was available with either front-wheel drive (FWD), or the Torsen-based quattro permanent four-wheel drive. The FWD models are powered by a 2.8-litre V6 engine, producing 142 kW (193 PS; 190 bhp), and a 3.7-litre V8 engine producing 169 kW (230 PS; 227 bhp), while the quattro received a 4.2-litre V8 producing 221 kW (300 PS; 296 bhp).

The A8 is available with standard luxury amenities, including dual-zone climate control, wood and leather interior trim, 14-way power and heated seats, and an enhanced Bose audio system.

In 1998, upon assuming office, German Chancellor Gerhard Schröder chose the A8 to be his official state car, marking a break from tradition, as his predecessors had preferred Mercedes-Benz S-Class models. Upon being re-elected to second term in 2002, he moved on to the next generation A8's sister model Volkswagen Phaeton.

In 1999, Audi's flagship received side curtain airbags, new colours, and restructuring of option packages. The North American "warm weather package" added a solar sunroof, which allows the interior ventilation fans to run, keeping the interior cool while the car is parked with the engine turned off. Changes to all models included a larger passenger-side mirror, and a first aid kit located in the rear centre armrest.

In 1999, for the 2000 model year, came a minor front-end restyle, with new, larger, clear headlights, a revised grille, and lower front valance with standard projection fog lamps. In the interior, the seats received a new, horizontal stitch pattern. Also, the 3.7-litre V8 FWD model was dropped, leaving the 2.8 V6 model and the long-wheelbase and short-wheelbase 4.2-litre quattro. These restyled cars also featured revised external door handles and an integrated radio antenna. For 2000, the North American A8 line-up was expanded to include the A8 L.

In 2001, Audi introduced its new W12 engine, a compact 6.0-litre unit developed by effectively mating two VR6 engines together at the crankshaft. The engine quickly became available in the A8, though only to European and Asian customers. From its introduction through its discontinuation in 2003, only 750 of the D2 "W12" models were produced. 2001 also marked the debut of the high-performance S8 variant in North American markets. It produced 360 hp.

In 2002, the A8 L received standard xenon high-intensity discharge lamp (HID) headlights, and a heated steering wheel. A tyre pressure monitoring system (TPMS), an updated Symphony II stereo, and new exterior colours were also added. For 2002, all A8 variants received a trunk/boot interior release lever to facilitate escape in the event an individual became trapped within.

Factory production of this generation ceased at Number 105,092 on 4 August 2002.

=== Coupé (prototype) ===
In 1997, IVM Automotive of Munich, Germany built a two-door Audi A8 Coupé. The car was unveiled at the 1997 Geneva Motor Show. Audi contracted IVM to build the prototype, and was considering production of the vehicle. The coupé had a re-engineered aluminium body, shorter than the production A8 saloon. Like the Mercedes-Benz CL-Class, there was no central "B" pillar, giving the car a seamless design with a gradually sloping roofline. The car included custom leather seats which could seat four. Ultimately, Audi decided not to put the A8 Coupé into production, citing lower-than-expected sales figures for the similar BMW 8 Series (E31) and Mercedes-Benz S-Class Coupé. Only one A8 Coupé was ever built. The single prototype, painted in a colour called "Ming Blue pearl", remains the property of IVM Automotive, and resides in Munich. Its last public appearance was in 2002 on a series of test drives.

=== S8 ===
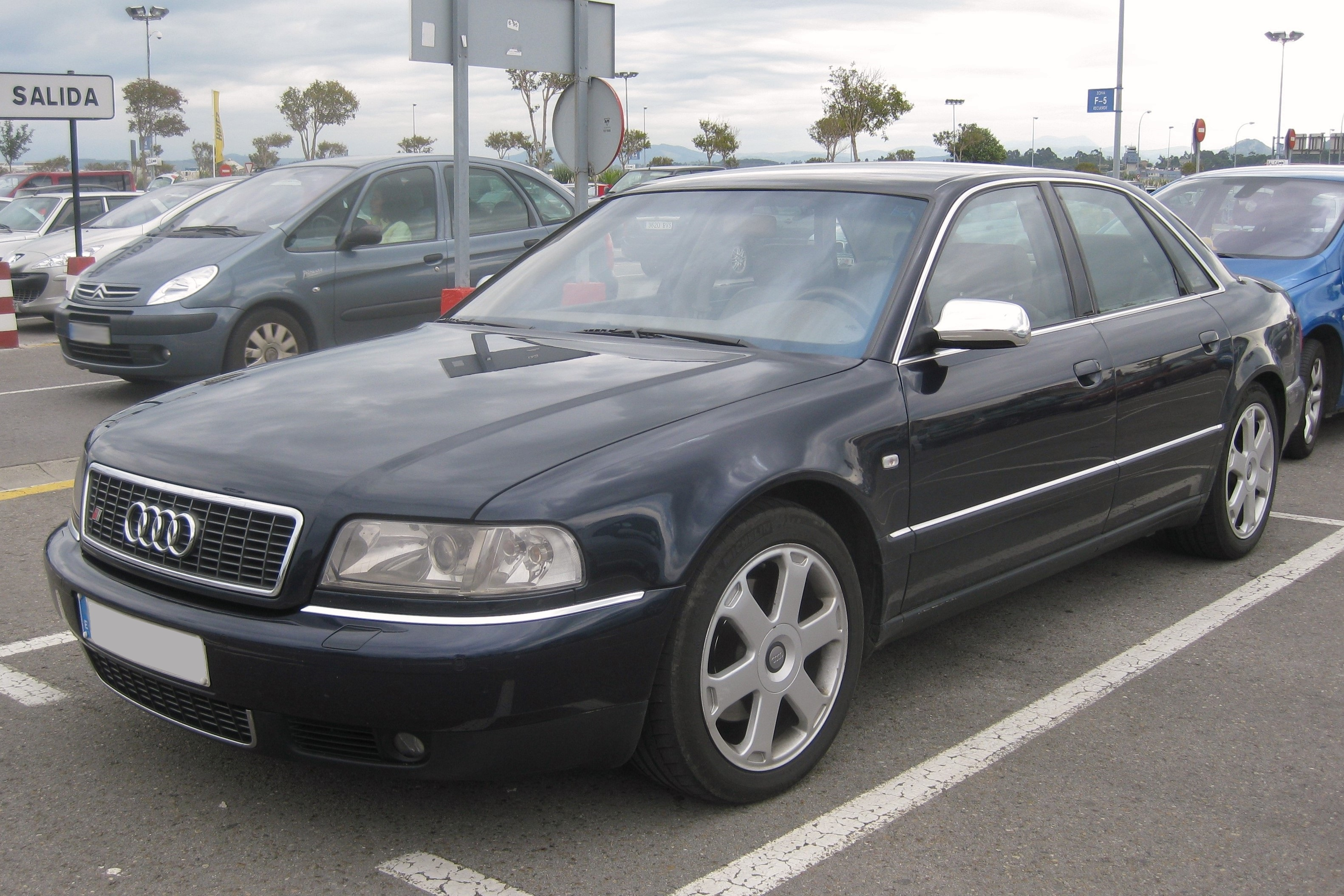

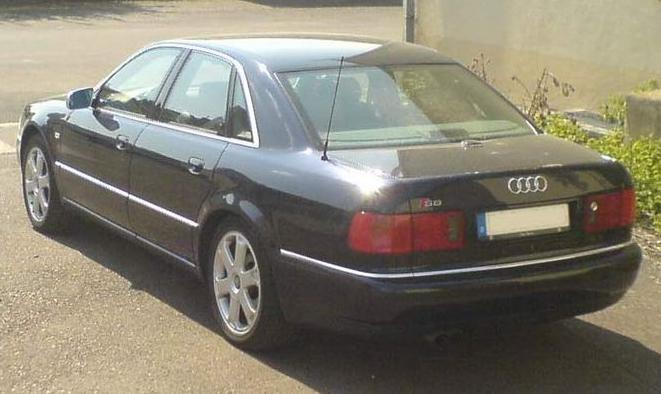
Facelift Audi S8

Audi introduced the S8 4.2 quattro into the European market in 1996. The S8 followed the naming convention of other high-performance Audi "S" models, such as the Audi A6-derived S6. In some markets such as the UK, the S8 was only available with the automatic transmission. Cosmetically, Audi differentiated the S8 from the A8 with solid aluminium alloy door mirror housings, chrome-effect beltline and lower front grille trim, and polished twin exhaust pipes, along with subtle "S8" badging. 14-way power adjustable and heated sports front seats with memory function were fitted as were heated rear seats. Standard alloy wheels were 18-inch cast aluminium alloy "Avus" six-spoke style. After the 1999 facelift, 20-inch polished nine-spoke RS wheels became an option. In 2002, 18-inch nine-spoke RS wheels became a no-cost option.

At the same time of the A8's facelift in late 1999, the S8 received the same cosmetic upgrades. This update marked the release of the S8 to the North American market. Production of the D2 series S8 ended in September 2002.

The D2 series S8 featured an uprated, 250 kW (335 hp) version of the 4.2-litre V8 with four valves per cylinder. From late 1999, Audi increased this to five valves per cylinder with power increased to 265 kW (355 hp) and 430 N⋅m (317 lb⋅ft). From launch in 1996, European-market models came standard with a six-speed manual transmission. A sports-recalibrated version of the ZF 5HP24 five-speed Tiptronic automatic, featuring "Dynamic Shift Programme" (DSP) was released a year later and was the only transmission available in most other markets.

A retuned, 20-millimetre (0.8 in) lowered sports suspension included a 30 percent stiffer spring rate and 40 percent more compression damping in the shock absorbers. Speed-sensitive "Servotronic" power assisted steering was also standard. The brakes featured a Bosch 5.3 anti-lock braking system (ABS), with electronic brakeforce distribution (EBD), and worked radially ventilated front discs. From 2002, an upgraded Bosch 5.7 electronic stability programme became standard fitment.

=== Engines ===
Engine			Power Torque at rpm	0–100 km/h (0–62 mph)	Top speed
Displacement	Year	Type	Power Torque at rpm	0–100 km/h (0–62 mph)	Top speed
2.8 L (2,771 cc)	1994–1996	V6	174 PS (128 kW; 172 hp); 250 N⋅m (184 lbf⋅ft)	9.1 sec	228 km/h (142 mph)
2.8 L (2,771 cc)	1996–2002	V6	193 PS (142 kW; 190 hp); 280 N⋅m (207 lbf⋅ft)	8.4 sec	236 km/h (147 mph)
3.7 L (3,697 cc)	1995–1998	V8	230 PS (169 kW; 227 hp); 315 N⋅m (232 lb⋅ft)	8.7 sec	247 km/h (153 mph)
3.7 L (3,697 cc)	1998–2002	V8	260 PS (191 kW; 256 hp); 350 N⋅m (258 lbf⋅ft)	7.8 sec	250 km/h (155 mph)
4.2 L (4,172 cc)	1994–1998	V8	300 PS (221 kW; 296 hp); 400 N⋅m (295 lbf⋅ft)	6.9 sec	250 km/h (155 mph)
4.2 L (4,172 cc)	1998–2002	V8	310 PS (228 kW; 306 hp); 410 N⋅m (302 lbf⋅ft)	6.5 sec	250 km/h (155 mph)
4.2 L (4,172 cc) (S8)	1996–1999	V8	340 PS (250 kW; 335 hp); 420 N⋅m (310 lbf⋅ft)	5.6 sec	250 km/h (155 mph)
4.2 L (4,172 cc) (S8)	1999–2002	V8	360 PS (265 kW; 355 hp); 430 N⋅m (317 lbf⋅ft)	5.4 sec	250 km/h (155 mph)
6.0 L (5,998 cc) (A8 L)	2001–2002	W12	420 PS (309 kW; 414 hp); 550 N⋅m (406 lbf⋅ft)	5.8 sec	250 km/h (155 mph)
2.5 L (2,496 cc)	1997–2000	V6 TDI	150 PS (110 kW; 148 hp); 310 N⋅m (229 lbf⋅ft)	9.9 sec	220 km/h (137 mph)
2.5 L (2,496 cc)	2000–2002	V6 TDI	180 PS (132 kW; 178 hp); 370 N⋅m (273 lbf⋅ft)	8.8 sec	227 km/h (141 mph)
3.3 L (3,328 cc)	2000–2002	V8 TDI	225 PS (165 kW; 222 hp); 480 N⋅m (354 lbf⋅ft)	8.2 sec	242 km/h (150 mph)

== D3 (Typ 4E; 2002) ==
Second generation (D3/4E)
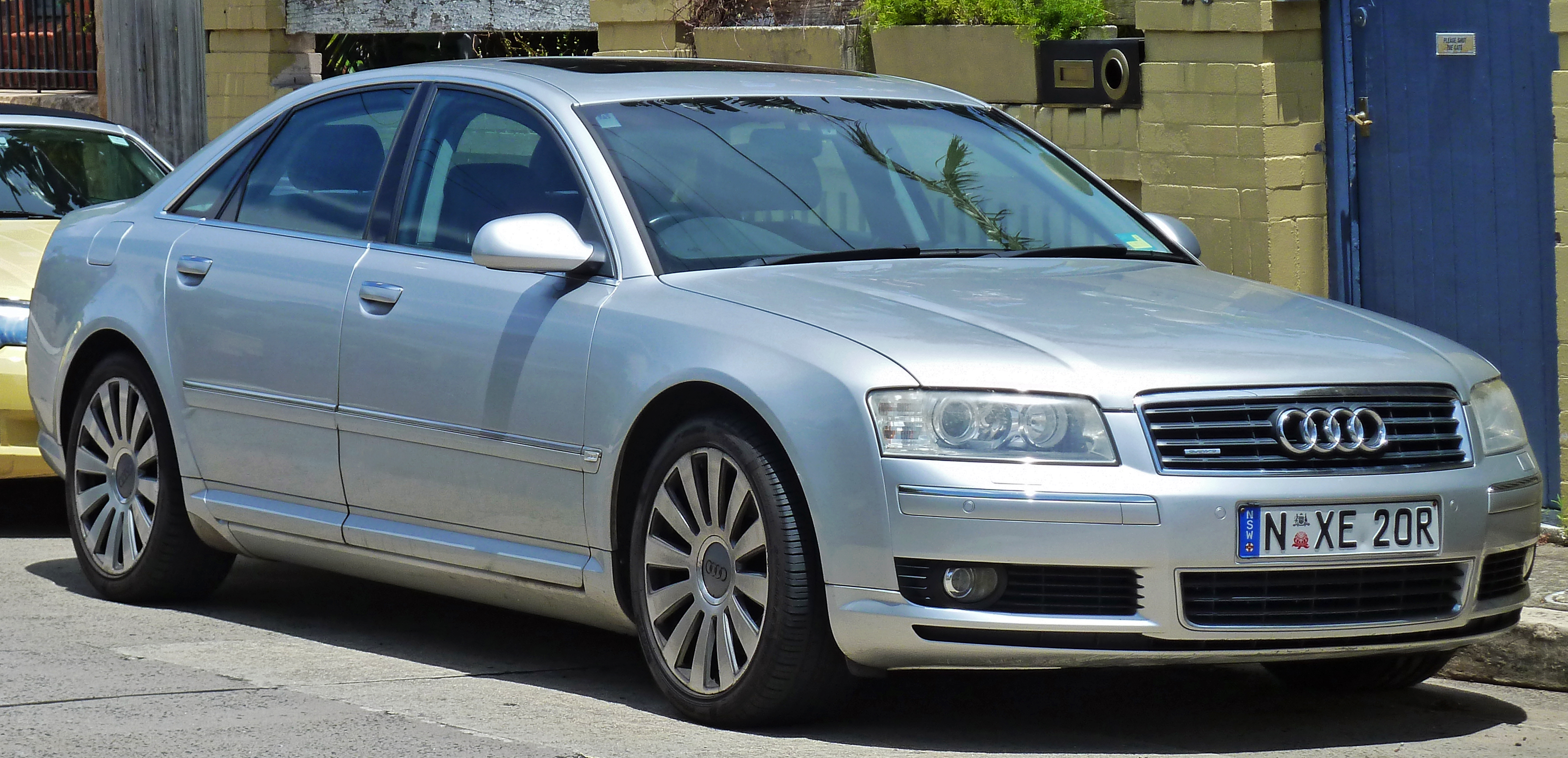
- Pre-facelift Audi A8 4.2 quattro

Overview
- Production: August 2002 – November 2010
- Model years: 2003–2010
- Assembly: Germany: Neckarsulm
- Designer: Miklós Kovács, Imre Hasanic, Dany Garand (1999)

Body and chassis
- Platform: Volkswagen Group D3
- Related: Audi S8; Bentley Flying Spur; Volkswagen Phaeton

Powertrain
- Engine: V6 petrol engine: 2.8 L V6; 3.0 L V6 3.1 L V6 FSI; V8 petrol engine: 3.7 L V8; 4.2 L V8; 4.2 L V8 FSI; V10 petrol engine: 5.2 L V10 FSI; W12 engine: 6.0 L W12; V6 diesel engine: 3.0 L V6 TDI; V8 diesel engine: 3.9 L V8 TDI; 4.1 L V8 TDI
- Transmission: Automatic transmission: 6-speed ZF 6HP26 Tiptronic automatic; Continuously variable transmission: LuK multitronic CVT

Dimensions
- Wheelbase: SWB: 2,944 mm (115.9 in); LWB: 3,074 mm (121.0 in)
- Length: SWB: pre 2007: 5,051 mm (198.9 in), post 2007: 5,062 mm (199.3 in); LWB: pre 2007: 5,181 mm (204.0 in), post 2007: 5,192 mm (204.4 in)
- Width: 1,894 mm (74.6 in)
- Height: SWB: 1,444 mm (56.9 in); LWB: 1,455 mm (57.3 in)
- Kerb weight: 1,670–1,990 kg (3,682–4,387 lb)

Previewed as the Audi Avantissimo concept at the 2001 IAA exhibition in Frankfurt, the second-generation Audi A8 (Typ 4E), built on the Volkswagen Group D3 platform, was unveiled via press release in July 2002 and introduced in November 2002 in Europe and in June 2003 (as a 2004 model) in the United States. The model was longer than the previous generation, with room for four or five large adult occupants in the cabin, depending on rear seat configuration. The D3 development program began in 1996, with the design process commencing in Ingolstadt in 1997. The whole Audi design studio based in Ingolstadt first contributed sketch proposals, from which numerous different themes emerged. Six of them were developed into full-size clay models and worked up in a traditional manner adjacent to full-size tape drawings. At least three one-quarter scale models were produced to explore other design variations.

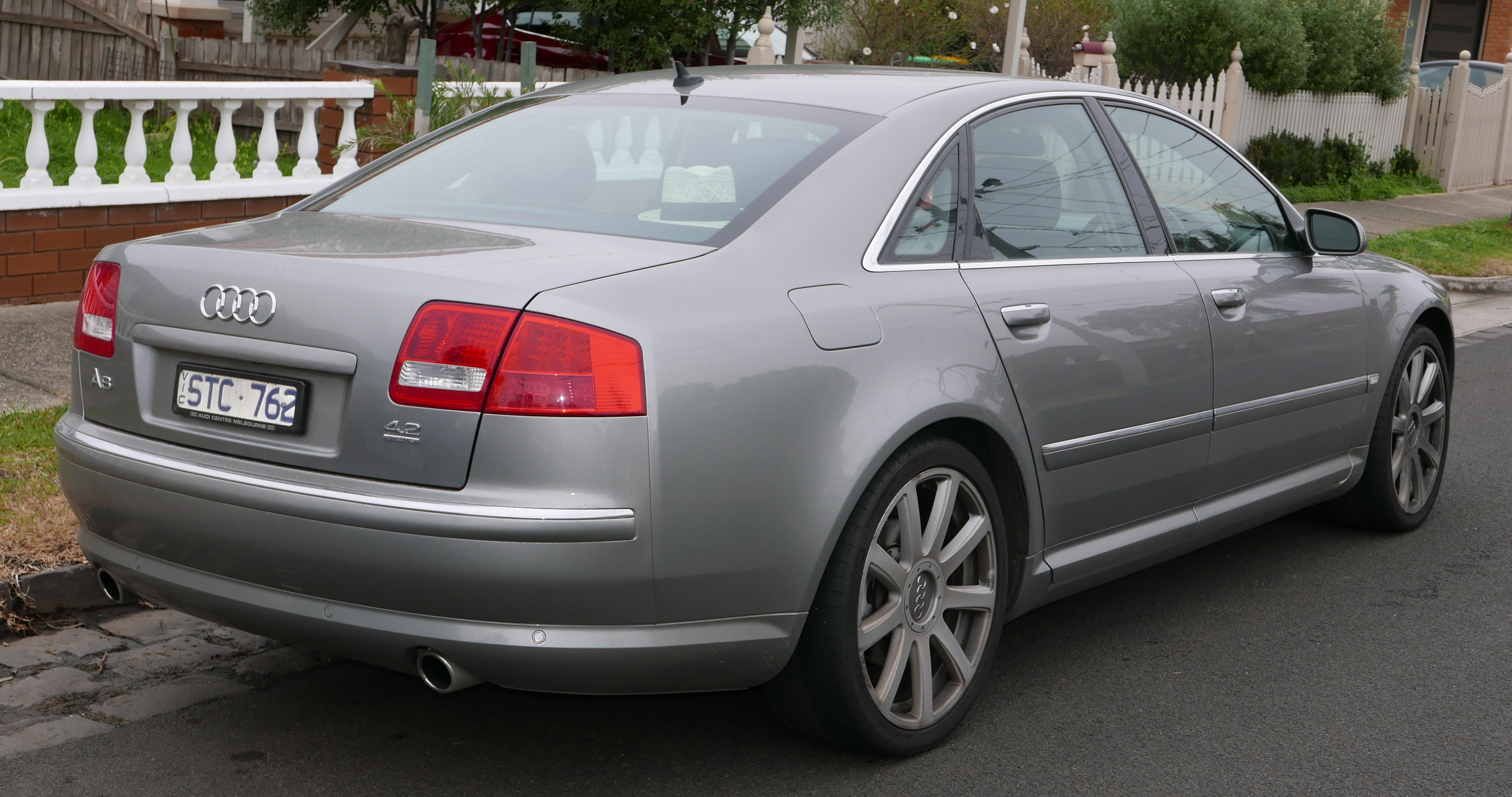
Pre-facelift Audi A8 4.2 quattro

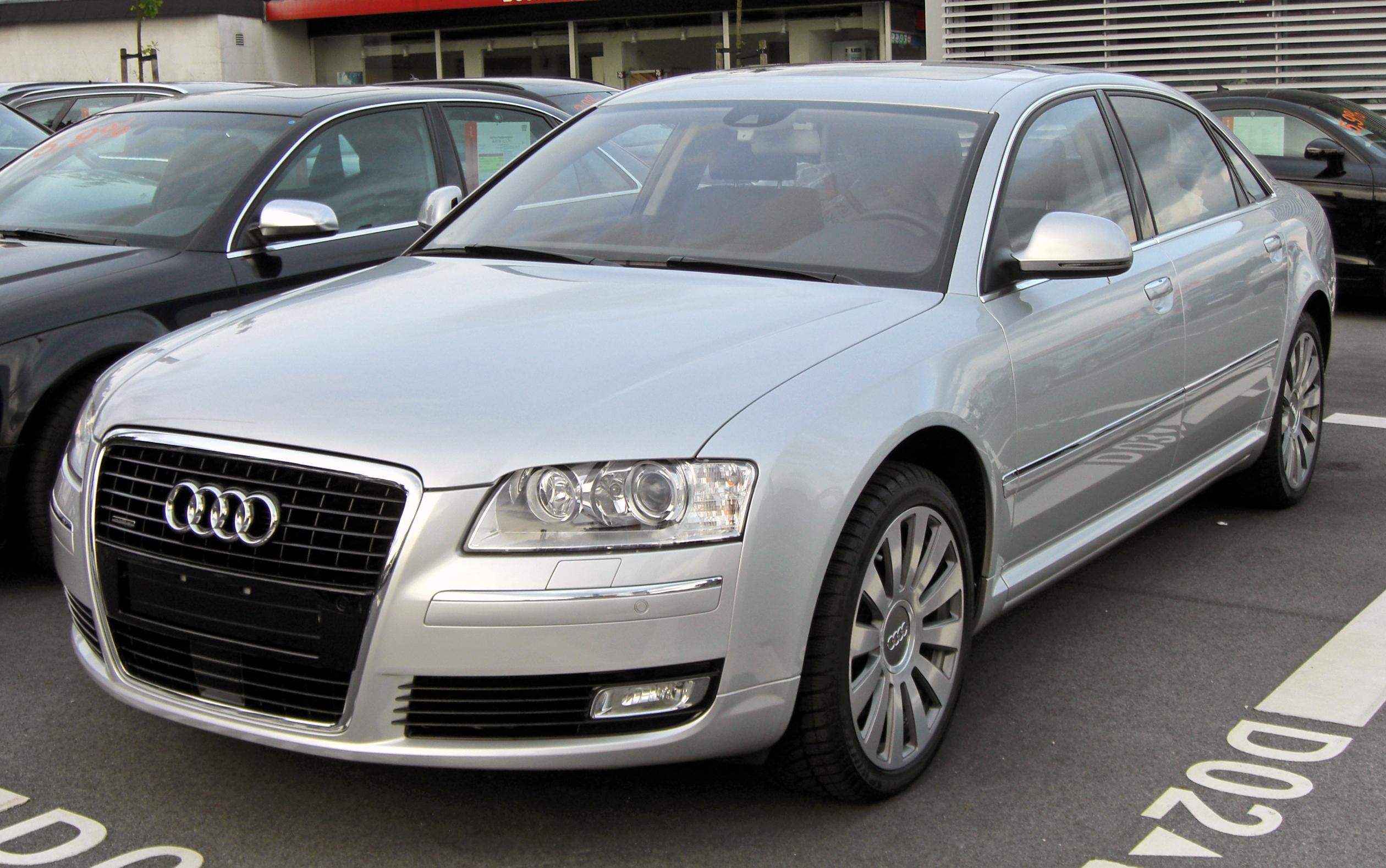

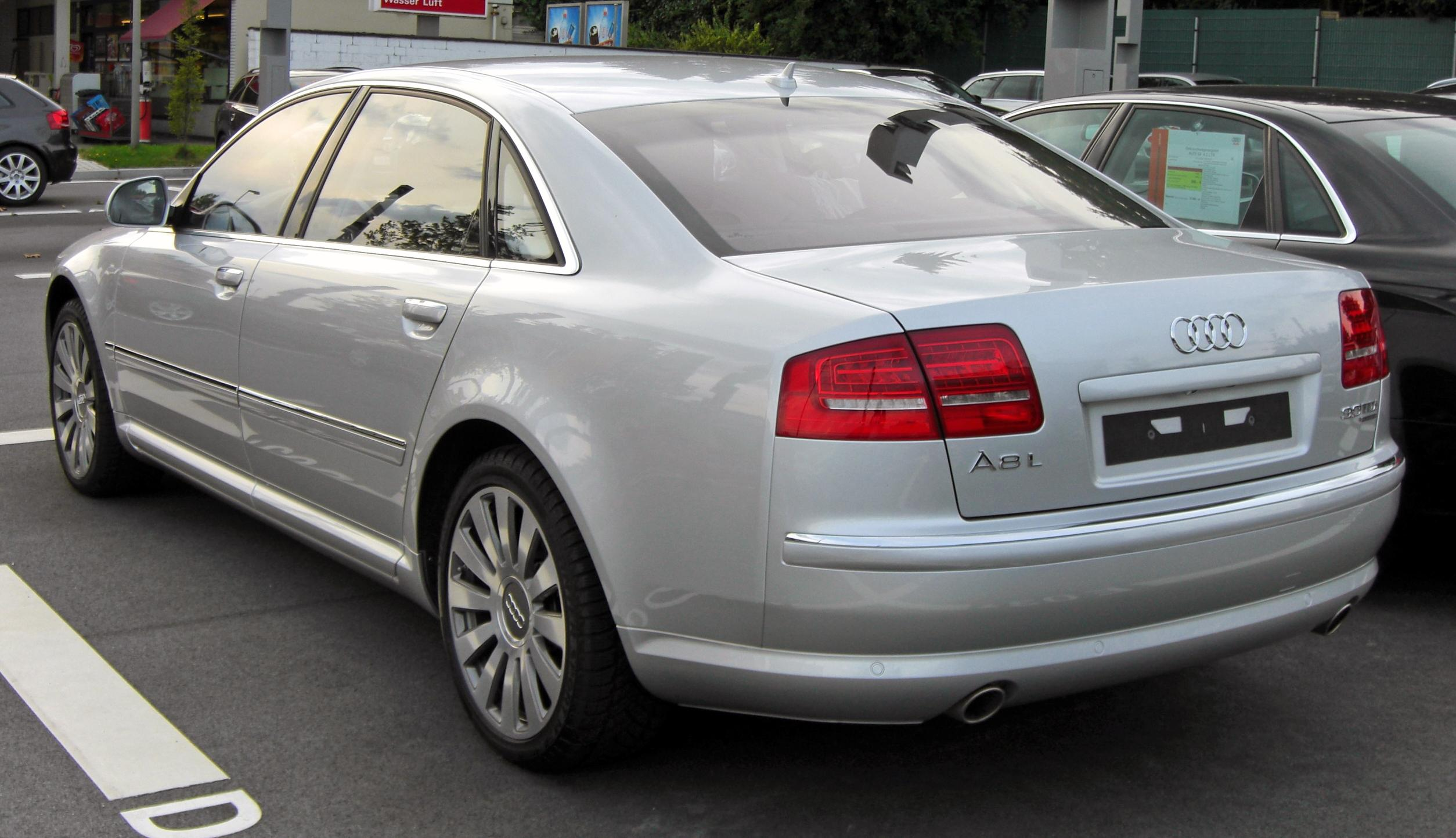
Facelift Audi A8 L 3.0 TDI

The six full-size exterior clay models were reduced to two in late 1998, and these continued to be refined in parallel for a year. At the end of 1999, the final theme selection was made by Miklós Kovács and Imre Hasanic, the main contributing designers. This lengthy development time was in part due to the body being made from aluminium, a material less able to take the small radii of sharp feature lines such as those on the (steel bodied) A4 (B6) designed in 1998.

In parallel to the exterior design development, the interior design was progressed with a total of four full-size models produced, and the production car's horizontally-themed instrument panel design dominant from early on, with Norbert Schneider, Mark Bergold and Enzo Rothfuss the main contributing designers.

Grouping major controls nearer to the driver for a more driver focused identity whilst creating a more airy and spacious feel were early priorities for the interior design team, which was headed by Jurgen Albamonte. This was in part facilitated by the Multi Media Interface (MMI) designed by Jurgen Schröder, that pioneered on the D3 A8 after the Audi Avantissimo concept car preview, and also by class leading colour and trim from Barbara Krömeke and Melinda Jenkins.

Under the supervision of Dany Garand, during the first half of 2000, exterior and interior clay models were digitized and developed using digital design tools in a supporting, not leading, capacity. The D3 final production design was later frozen in the summer of 2000 for an August 2002 start of production.

The A8 was previewed at the 2001 Frankfurt Motor Show by the Audi Avantissimo concept car. This concept introduced much of the technology later available on the series production A8 D3, including: Multi Media Interface, 6-speed automatic transmission with shift paddles, self-levelling adaptive air suspension with continuously controlled damping, electric park brake, bi-xenon headlights with static Adaptive Front Lighting System (AFS) curve headlights, dashboard, and driver identification systems with a fingerprint scanner. Unlike the Avantissimo, though, an estate version of the A8 never entered production.

As with the previous version, two body variants of the second generation A8 are offered, the A8 (standard, or short wheelbase), and the long-wheelbase (LWB) A8 L. The A8 L adds 120 mm (4.7 inches) to the rear legroom and 11 mm (0.43 in) to the overall height of the car.

For quattro all-wheel drive models, a ZF 6HP26-A61 (lower torque capacity 6HP19 version for 6 cylinder models) six-speed Tiptronic automatic transmission with "Dynamic Shift Programme" (DSP) and "sport" mode, with optional steering wheel mounted paddle-shifters, is the only transmission offering. Output is transmitted via Audi's quattro generation IV all-wheel drive system using the Torsen T-1 centre differential with a default 50:50 torque split front/rear. If the road conditions change, the purely mechanical Torsen differential responds without any delay; it can divert up to 70 percent of power to the front or rear axles.

=== Innovations ===
- World premiere of Multi Media Interface (MMI) in-car user interface (similar to BMW iDrive)
- Multiplexed high speed MOST Bus optical fiber data networks (interconnecting tens of microprocessors on common databusses), integrated with MMI
- First Audi with Bi-Xenon HID headlamps for both low and high beam
- World premiere of static Adaptive Front Lighting System (AFS) curve headlights (from Hella)
- First Audi with 4-wheel Adaptive Air Suspension and Continuous Damping Control (CDC)-(Skyhook suspension).
- First Audi GPS navigation system with DVD maps
- First Audi with a six-speed automatic transmission (Tiptronic)
- First Audi featuring driver identification system

In 2005, new internal combustion engines became available. For the European and Asian market customers, the entry-level 3.0-litre V6 engine was replaced with a new 3.1-litre unit (badged as "3.2") featuring Fuel Stratified Injection (FSI), which it shared with the Audi B7 A4 and Audi C6 A6. The top-of-the-line W12 version debuted that year. The advantage of the W12 engine layout is its compact packaging, allowing Audi to build a 12-cylinder sedan with all-wheel drive, whereas a conventional V12 could only have a rear-wheel drive configuration as it would have no space in the engine bay for a differential and other components required to power the front wheels. In fact, Audi's 6.0-litre W12 is slightly smaller (by overall dimensions) than the 4.2-litre V8. This model was also the first to be offered with LED running lights.

In addition to the added powertrains, Audi restyled the D3 platform A8 range slightly in 2005, giving all variants a taller, wider trapezoidal single-frame grille. The top-of-the-line W12 engined W12 version was the first model to be equipped with this grille; V8 engined models were fitted with the new grille the following year. The W12 variant was known for its appearance as the hero car in Transporter 2, and its sequel, Transporter 3.

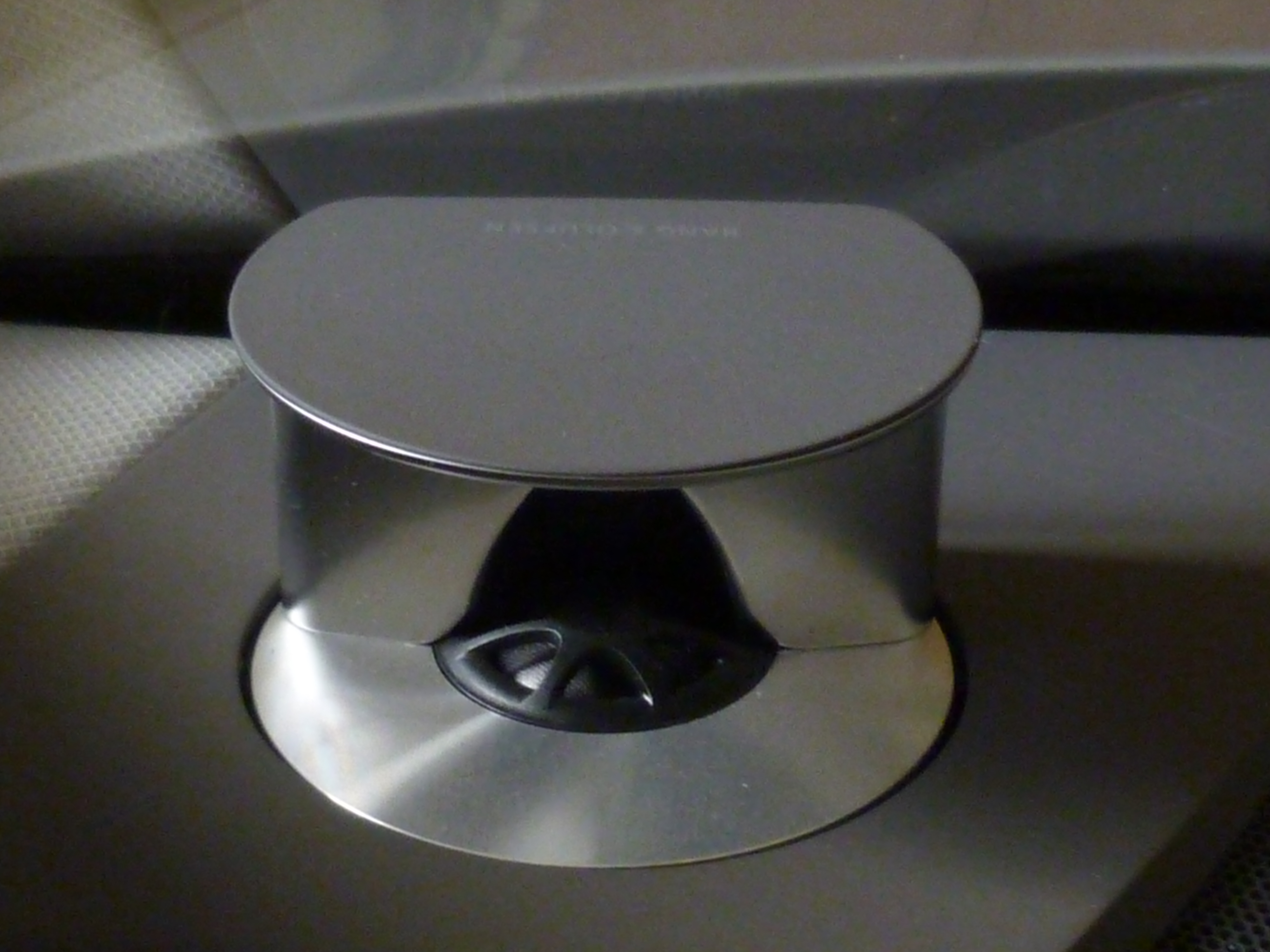
The motorized Bang & Olufsen tweeter in a 2008 Audi A8

The D3 generation A8 introduced the 235 kW (315 hp) 4.1-litre Turbocharged Direct Injection (TDI) V8 engine (subsequently uprated to 240 kW (322 hp)). It is badged as the "4.2 TDI" and is based on the "4.0 TDI" badged 3.9L turbodiesel engine. It uses two turbochargers and two intercoolers, with each turbocharger functioning exclusively for one bank of four cylinders.

The adaptive air suspension gives the vehicle clearance a range from its normal 120 mm up to 145 mm in lift mode and down to 95 mm in the Autobahn mode, which is automatically activated when a speed of more than 120 km/h (75 mph) is maintained for more than 30 seconds.

In September 2005, Audi became the first car maker to offer the 1,000-watt 14-channel ICEpower sound system option from Bang & Olufsen.

=== 2007 facelift ===
Changes include:

- Updated front fascia incorporating Audi's signature single frame full-nose grille. Complementing the pronounced styling of the nose, designers ditched the understated round fog lights, opting for larger rectangular fog light housings- inside a set of 'Side-View illuminators' have been integrated into the housing; aiding drivers in low-light or poor visibility conditions by automatically illuminating depending on speed and steering angle. Side-View Illuminators operate independent of fog lights.
- Updated tail-light assembly featuring brighter and more efficient LED bulbs. Dual rear fog lights are still standard.

New optional features:

- Full speed range adaptive cruise control ACC Plus, can now brake until stop
- Braking guard radar-guided forward collision warning system
- "Side Assist" detects cars in the A8's blind spots
- Lane assist helps when the driver attempts to change lanes without signalling first.

=== A8 L W12 quattro Security ===
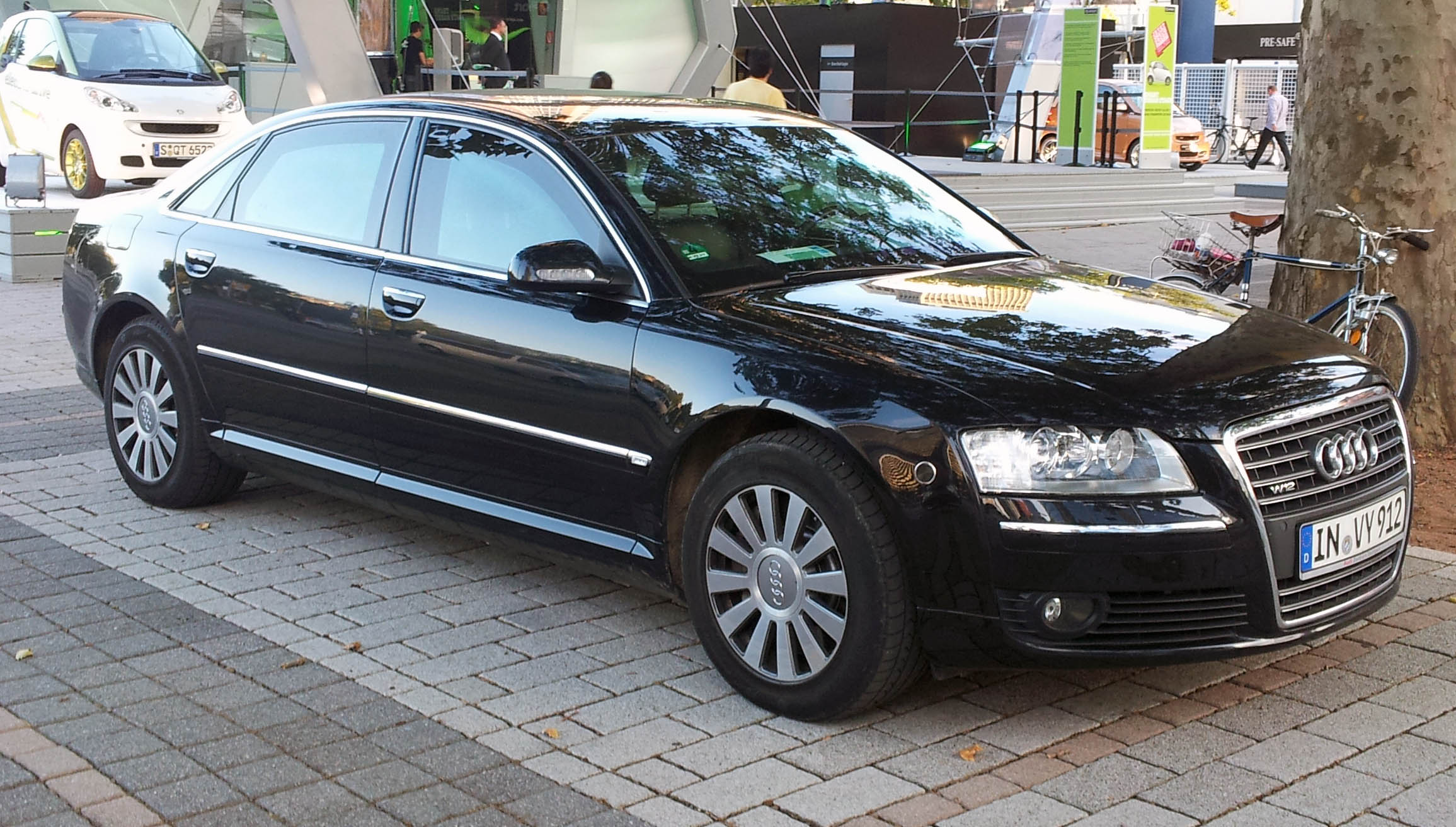
Armored A8

The A8 L W12 quattro Security is an armoured vehicle with B6+ and B7 (European standard) ballistic ratings. It includes a W12 engine rated at 331 kW; 444 hp (450 PS) and 580 N⋅m (428 lbf⋅ft) of torque, emergency exit system featuring pyrotechnic blown-out doors, fire extinguisher system with spray jets located in the engine compartment, underbody and in the wheel arches; smoke extractor in passenger compartment, run flat tires, bullet proof windows, the full protection plus package and LED flashers in the exterior mirrors. Buyers are also offered facility to dispatch two drivers on a special training course.

The A8L W12 was featured as the protagonist's car in the Transporter film series.

=== S8 5.2 FSI quattro ===
The S8 high-performance sports variant, now called the "Audi S8 5.2 FSI quattro", was announced in the last quarter of 2005 and full production started in June 2006 and ended in September 2009.

The S8 includes subtle exterior changes to distinguish it from its related A8. The trapezoidal "single-frame" grille bears the characteristic Audi "S model" vertical strut detail which is highlighted in a chrome finish. "S8" badging is displayed front and rear, whilst "V10" badges are displayed on each front wing above the side-repeater indicators. The rear boot-lid incorporates a subtle rear spoiler, and the rear is finished with four chromed oval exhaust tailpipes. Adaptive Xenon-plus high-intensity discharge (HID) headlamps include static turning lights, along with "swiveling" dynamic cornering lights. Daytime running lamps are five light-emitting diodes (LEDs) incorporated into a cloverleaf designed reflector, incorporated into the main headlamp housing.

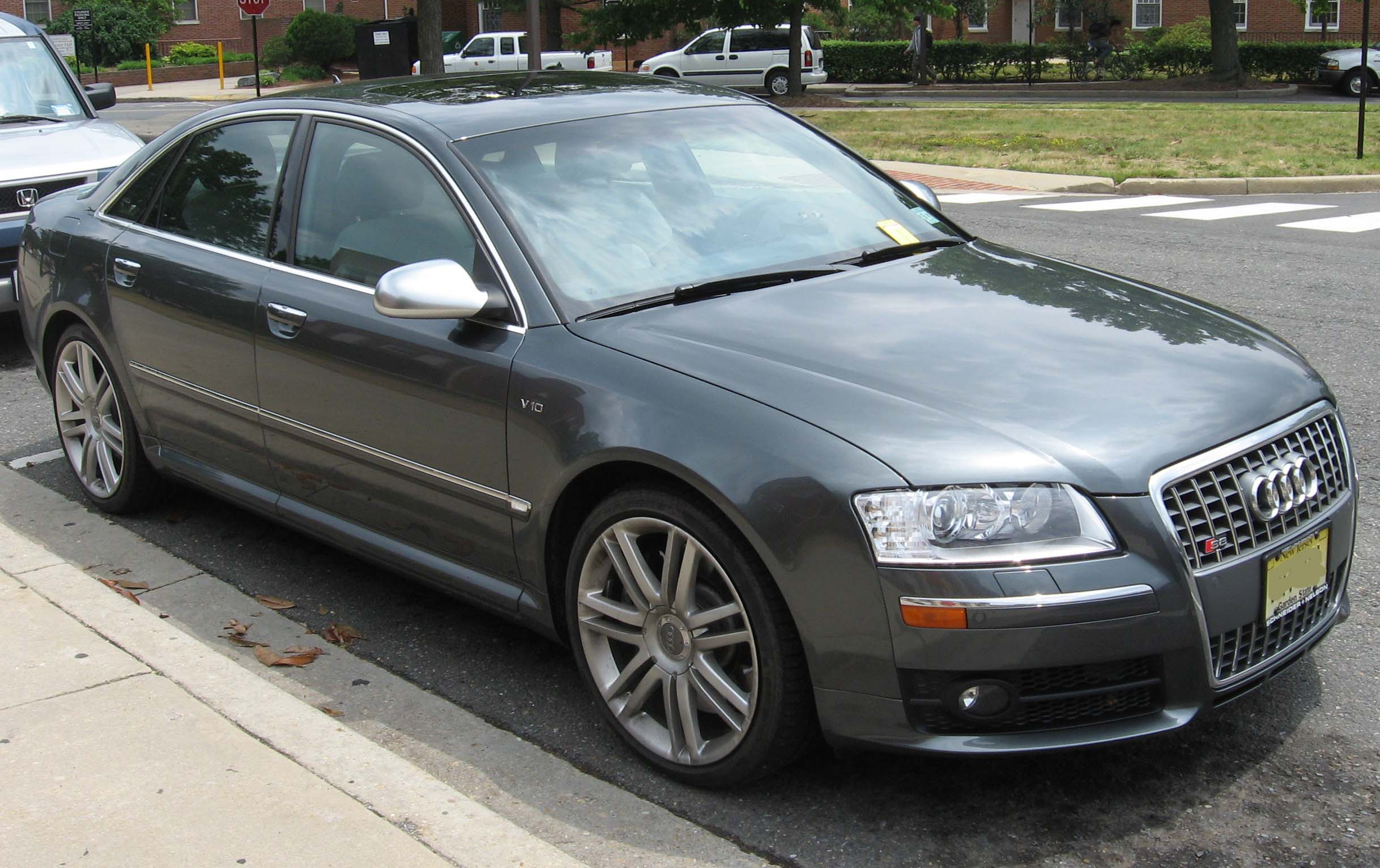

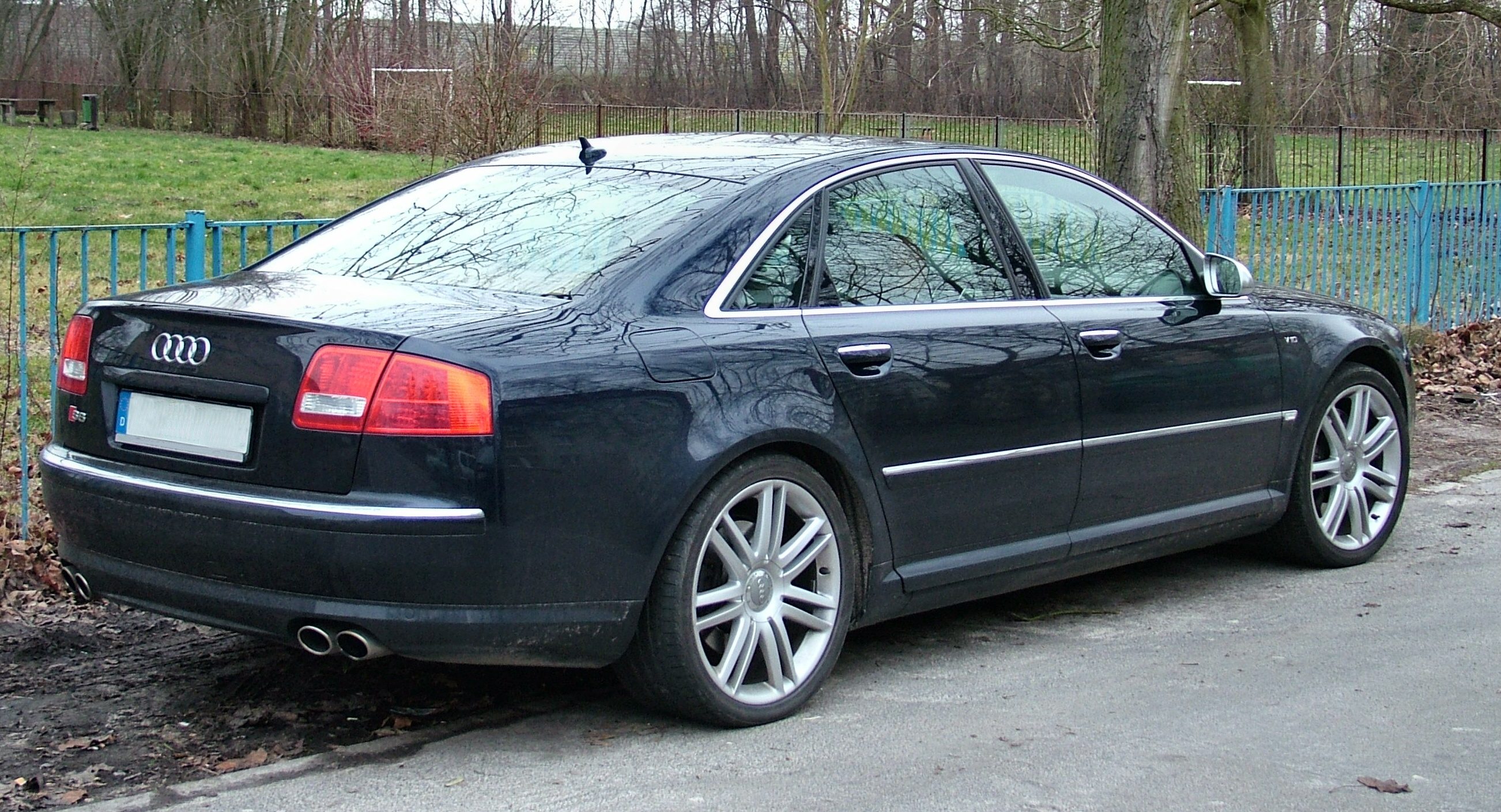
Pre-facelift Audi S8

The D3 series S8 features a 5.2-litre all-aluminium alloy four-valves per cylinder V10 petrol engine. This engine, a first for Audi, is often incorrectly referred to as a derivative of the Lamborghini 5-litre V10 engine fitted to the first-generation Gallardo. The 5.2-litre V10 in the S8 is based on Audi's 4.2-litre V8 FSI. Lamborghini replaced its own 5-litre engine with the 5.2-litre engine from Audi R8 for the second generation Gallardo and its successor, the Huracán.

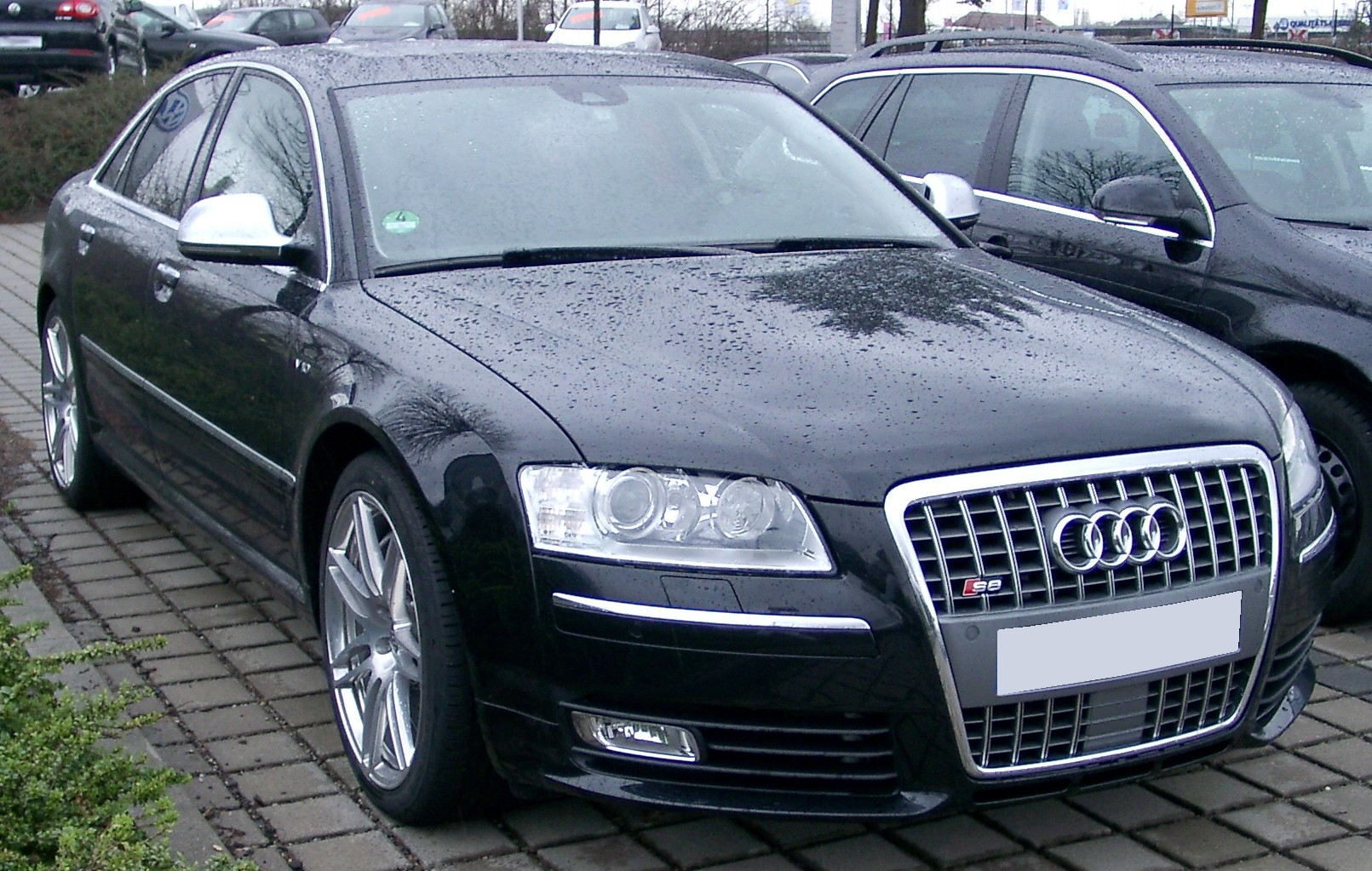

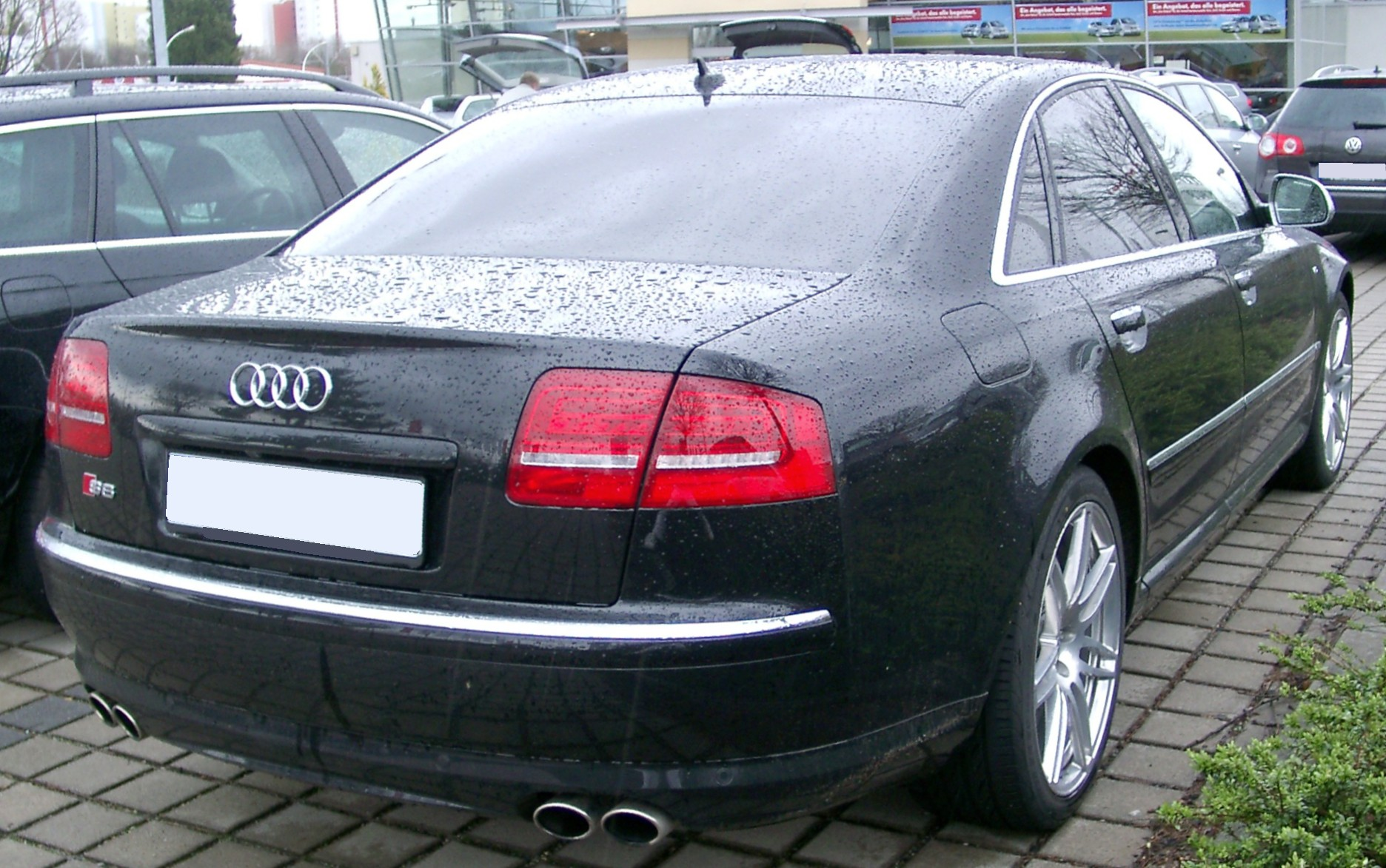
Facelift Audi S8

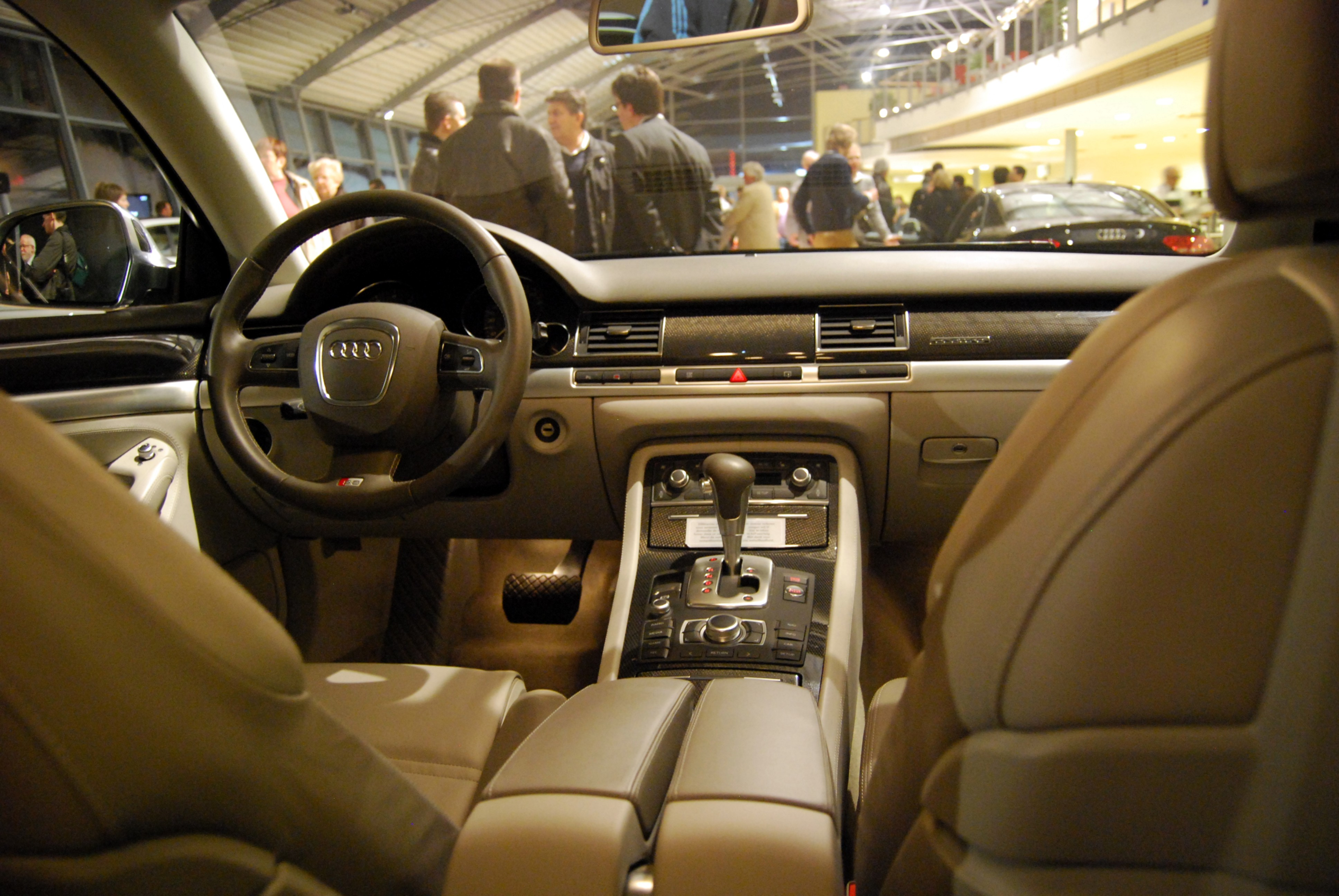
Facelift interior

A sports-optimised ZF 6HP26-A61 six-speed Tiptronic automatic transmission with "Dynamic Shift Programme" (DSP) and "sport" mode, with steering wheel mounted paddle-shifters, is the only offering. Output is transmitted via Audi's quattro generation IV all-wheel drive system, initially using the Torsen T-1 50:50 dynamic centre differential, and from 2007 for the 2008 model year, utilising the Torsen T-3 asymmetric dynamic centre differential, with a "default" torque distribution of 40 percent to the front axle and 60 percent to the rear. If the road conditions change, the purely mechanical differential responds without any delay; it can divert up to 85 percent of power to the rear wheels, and as much as 65 percent to the front wheels.

The S8's top speed is electronically limited to 250 km/h (155 mph). Audi's factory performance claims indicate a 0 to 100 km/h (0 to 62 mph) time of 5.1 seconds whilst consuming 98 RON unleaded petrol. The S8 has similar performance to Audi's own top-of-the-line A8 L W12, though the W12 is more expensive, has more torque, and built on a longer wheelbase. Compared to the A8 L W12, the S8 has sportier mechanical features such as a firmer suspension, larger wheels, and ceramic brakes. The shorter wheelbase and 10-cylinder engine save weight for better handling, but at 5.4 seconds from 0–60 mph (97 km/h), the S8 trails the W12 in acceleration.

The S8, like the A8, utilises a multi-link suspension layout front and rear, with pressurised air springs. However, for the S8, the effective spring and damper rates are noticeably firmer, along with re-engineered suspension mounts.

The brake system consists of radially ventilated discs all round. The discs are clamped with gloss-black painted dual-piston calipers up front, and a single-piston sliding caliper at the rear, coupled to an electro-mechanical parking brake. A Bosch ESP 5.7 (later upgraded to ESP 8.0) electronic stability control, with ABS, brake assist, and EBD complete the brake system. Optional "Audi ceramic" carbon fibre-reinforced silicon carbide (C/SiC) composite front and rear brakes are available, which use radially vented, and floating SGL Carbon discs, with anthracite grey painted twelve-piston fixed Brembo monobloc alloy calipers. Standard alloy wheels consist of 20-inch "S design" alloy wheels.

=== A8L Centennial Limited Edition (2009) ===
The A8L Centennial Limited Edition (奧迪A8L百年限量版) is a limited (800 units total) version of the A8L 3.0 FSI with multitronic and the A8L 6.0 W12 quattro for the Chinese market, commemorating Audi's 100th anniversary. It includes a horizontal chrome-plated front grille (from the A8L 6.0 W12 quattro), "V6" metal logo at the upper left of the air-inlet grille (A8L 3.0 FSI), LED daytime running lights, 19-inch 12-spoke polished aluminium alloy wheels, heated steering wheel in grey leather with beige stitching, Bang & Olufsen advanced audio system, Alcantara equipment bag, Assam ash red veneer, floor mat with aluminium trim and a metal 'Audi exclusive' commemorative logo at inner door trims.

The vehicles went on sale on 18 October 2009 as 2010 model year vehicles.

=== Engine variants ===
Engine		Power, Torque at rpm	0–100 km/h (0–62 mph)	Top speed
displacement	type	Power, Torque at rpm	0–100 km/h (0–62 mph)	Top speed
2.8 L (2,773 cc)	V6 FSI	210 PS (154 kW; 207 bhp); 280 N⋅m (207 lbf⋅ft) at 3,000	8.0 sec	237 km/h (147 mph)
3.0 L (2,976 cc)	V6	220 PS (162 kW; 217 bhp); 300 N⋅m (221 lbf⋅ft) at 3,200	7.9 sec	241 km/h (150 mph)
3.1 L (3,123 cc)	V6 FSI	256 PS (188 kW; 252 bhp); 330 N⋅m (243 lbf⋅ft) at 3,250	7.7 sec	250 km/h (155 mph)
3.7 L (3,697 cc)	V8	280 PS (206 kW; 276 bhp); 360 N⋅m (266 lbf⋅ft) at 3,750	7.3 sec	250 km/h (155 mph)
4.2 L (4,172 cc)	V8	334 PS (246 kW; 329 bhp); 430 N⋅m (317 lbf⋅ft) at 3,500	6.4 sec	250 km/h (155 mph)
4.2 L (4,172 cc)	V8 FSI	350 PS (257 kW; 345 bhp); 440 N⋅m (325 lbf⋅ft) at 3,500	6.1 sec	250 km/h (155 mph)
5.2 L (5,204 cc)	V10 FSI (S8)	450 PS (331 kW; 444 bhp); 540 N⋅m (398 lbf⋅ft) at 3,500	5.1 sec	250 km/h (155 mph)
6.0 L (5,998 cc)	W12	450 PS (331 kW; 444 bhp); 580 N⋅m (428 lbf⋅ft) at 4,700	5.1 sec	250 km/h (155 mph)
3.0 L (2,967 cc)	V6 TDI	233 PS (171 kW; 230 bhp); 450 N⋅m (332 lbf⋅ft) at 3,250	7.8 sec	243 km/h (151 mph)
3.0 L (2,967 cc)	V6 TDI (Quattro)	250 PS (184 kW; 247 bhp); 550 N⋅m (406 lbf⋅ft) at 3,250	7.9 sec	249 km/h (155 mph)
3.9 L (3,937 cc)	V8 TDI	275 PS (202 kW; 271 bhp); 650 N⋅m (479 lbf⋅ft) at 1,800	6.7 sec	250 km/h (155 mph)
4.1 L (4,134 cc)	V8 TDI	326 PS (240 kW; 322 bhp); 650 N⋅m (479 lbf⋅ft) at 1,600	5.9 sec	250 km/h (155 mph)

In North America, only the 4.2 V8, 5.2 V10, and 6.0 W12 petrol engines were available. The 4.0 TDI was discontinued when the 4.2 TDI was introduced.

== D4 (Typ 4H, 2009) ==
Third generation (D4/4H)
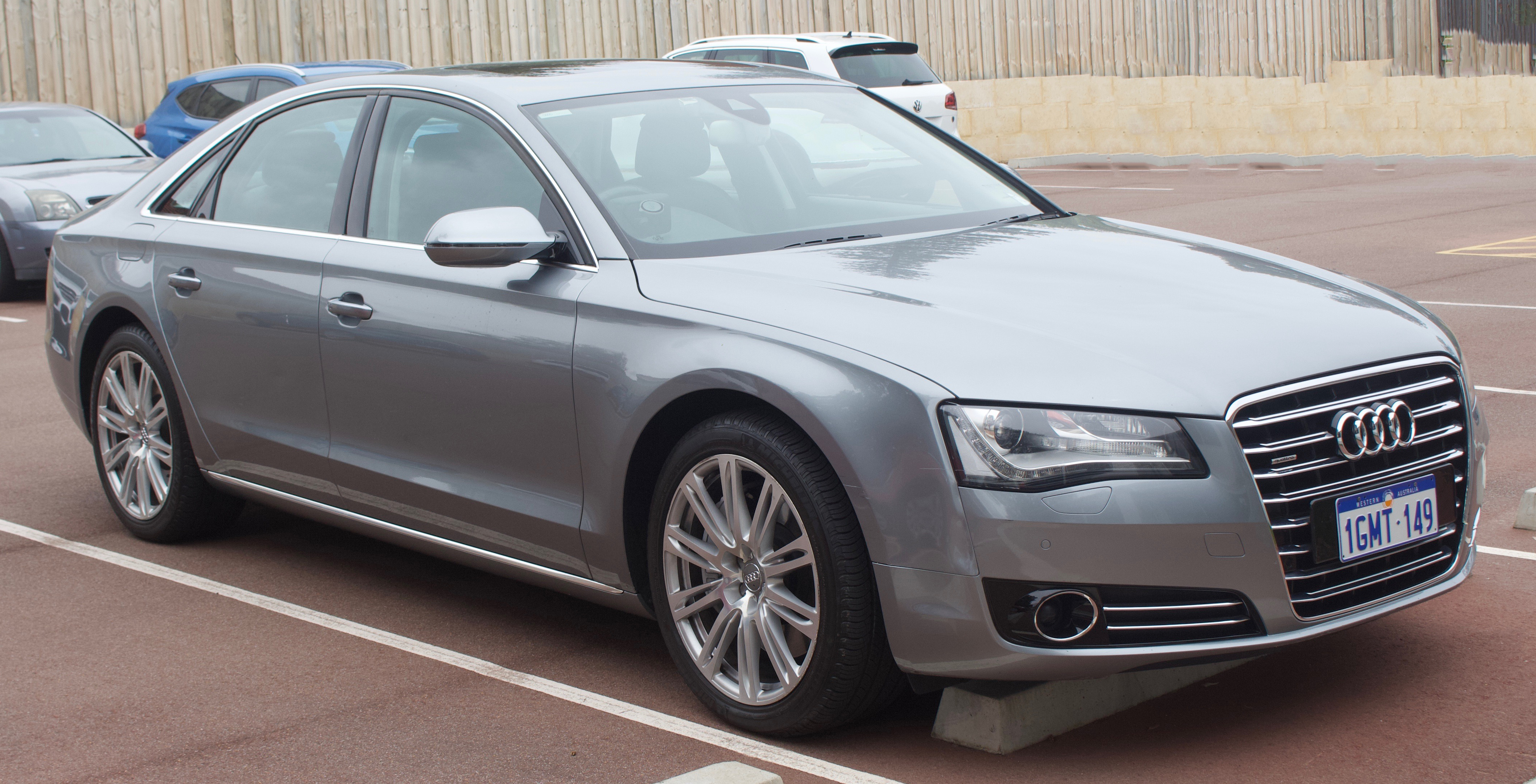

Overview
- Production: 2009–2013 (FWD); 2009–2017 (quattro 4WD)
- Model years: 2010–2017
- Assembly: Germany: Neckarsulm; Russia: Kaluga (Volkswagen Group Rus: 2013–2016)
- Designer: Christian Winkelmann (2006)

Body and chassis
- Platform: Volkswagen MLB
- Related: Audi A6; Audi A7; Volkswagen Phideon

Powertrain
- Engine: petrol: 2.0 TFSI I4; 2.0 TFSI Hybrid I4; 2.5 FSI V6 (China); 3.0 TFSI V6; 4.0 TFSI V8; 4.2 FSI V8; 6.3 CEJA FSI W12; diesel: 3.0 TDI V6; 4.2 TDI V8
- Electric motor: 54 PS (40 kW; 53 hp) Disc-shaped electric motor
- Transmission: Automatic transmission: 8-speed ZF 8HP Tiptronic automatic
- Hybrid drivetrain: FHEV (A8 Hybrid)
- Battery: 1.3 kWh Li-ion

Dimensions
- Wheelbase: 2,992 mm (117.8 in); 3,122 mm (122.9 in) (LWB)
- Length: 5,131 mm (202.0 in); 5,267 mm (207.4 in) (LWB)
- Width: 1,948 mm (76.7 in)
- Height: 1,461 mm (57.5 in); 1,471 mm (57.9 in) (LWB)
- Kerb weight: 1,977 kg (4,358.5 lb) A8L 3.0TL; 2,000 kg (4,409.2 lb) A8 4.2L; 2,020 kg (4,453.3 lb) A8 L 4.2L; 2,165 kg (4,773.0 lb) A8 L 6.3L

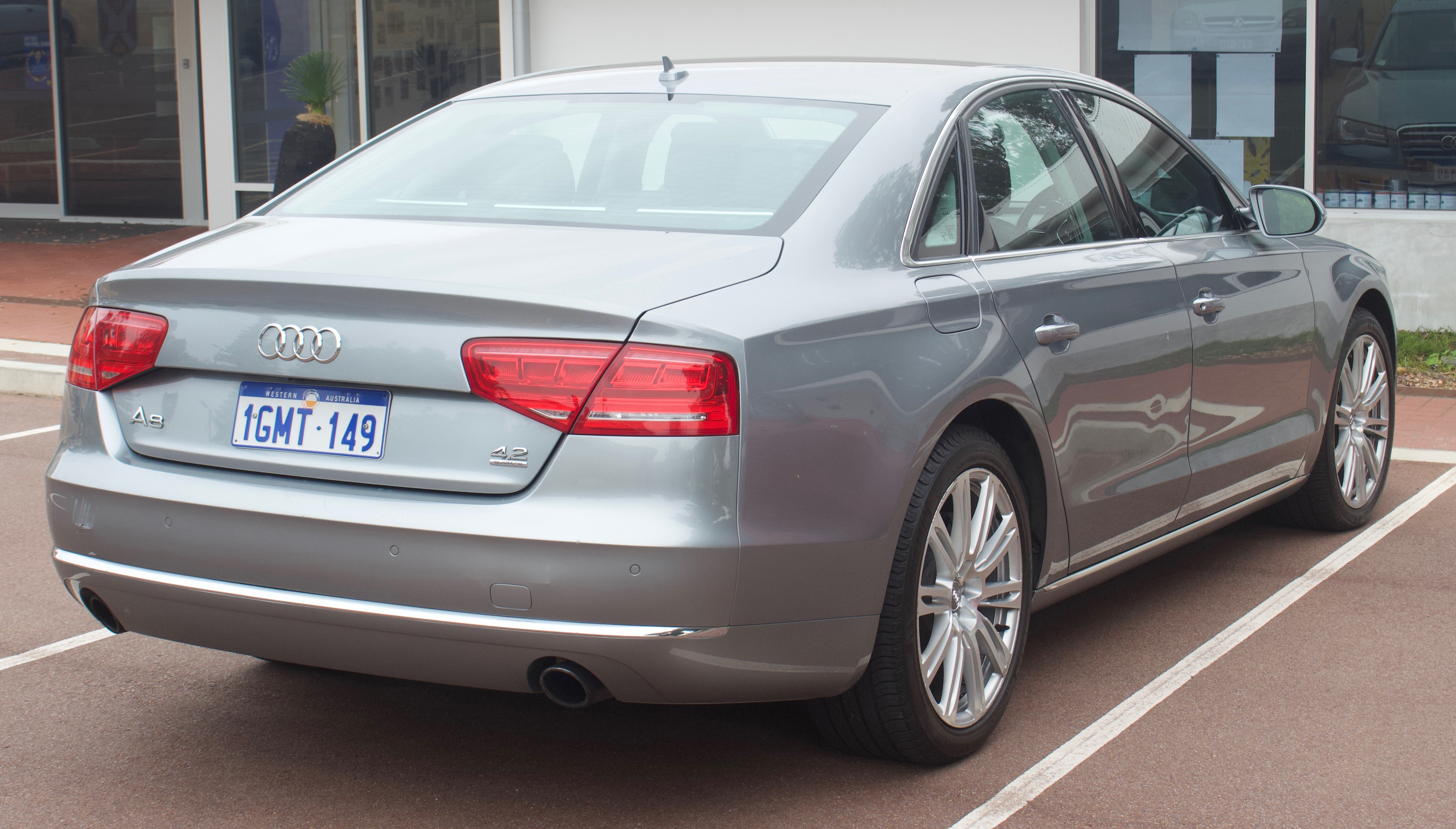
Audi A8 (pre-facelift)

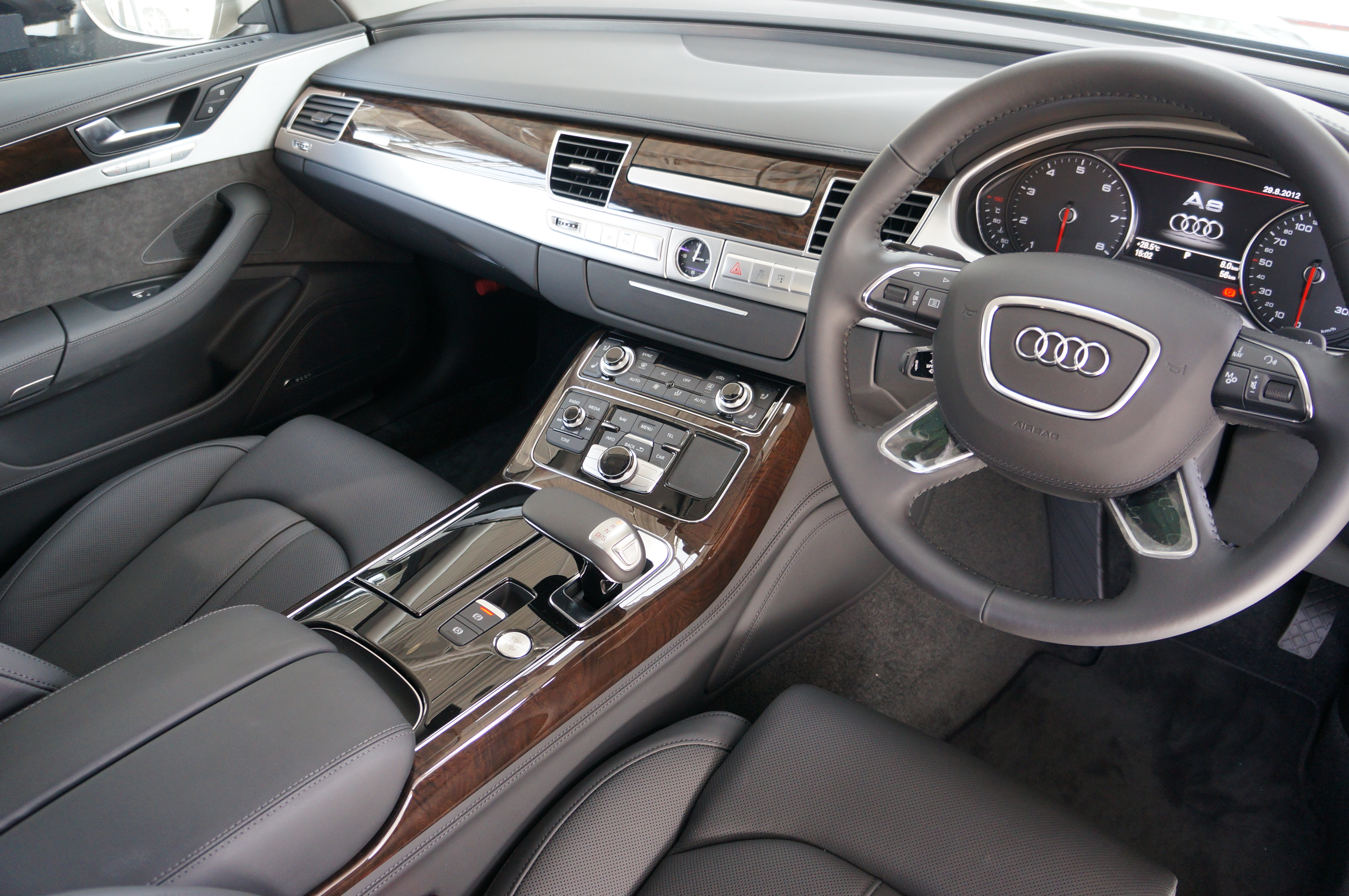
Interior (pre-facelift)

=== Initial release ===
The third-generation Audi A8 (Typ 4H) is based on the Volkswagen Group MLB platform, but retains the Audi Space Frame aluminium construction of the previous A8, making it the lightest all-wheel drive car in the full-size luxury segment, while also giving it best-in-class fuel economy. The quattro all-wheel drive system splits torque with a default bias of 40 percent front and 60 percent rear.

The vehicle was unveiled at Design Miami 2009 on 30 November 2009, followed by the 2010 North American International Auto Show.

Early models include A8 4.2 FSI quattro (372PS), A8 3.0 TDI quattro (250PS), A8 4.2 TDI quattro (350PS). A8 3.0 TDI (204PS) was added later.

Initial internal combustion engine options comprise 4.2-litre Fuel Stratified Injection (FSI) petrol and Turbocharged Direct Injection (TDI) diesel V8s, with 273 kW (366 hp) and 258 kW (346 hp) respectively. A 3.0-litre V6 TDI with either 184 kW (247 hp) or 150 kW (201 hp) will be available later. This generation is the final A8 and final Audi model to be offered with a 6.3-litre W12 engine option. The W12 was exclusive to the long-wheelbase model (A8 L) and had a larger displacement and direct fuel injection. All engines are mated to the new eight-speed ZF 8HP automatic transmission. Although other Audi vehicles such as the 2010 Audi S4 and 2011 Audi A7 had switched from the 4.2 L V8 to the 3.0 L supercharged V6, the Audi A8 retained a higher-output 4.2 L V8 as the base engine for the 2011 and 2012 model years in North America.

Taiwan models went on sale on 11 November 2010. Early models include 3.0 TFSI quattro (290PS).

==== New features ====
Changes include:

- Full LED headlamps with Automatic high beam switching or Audi adaptive light (Xenon) with variable headlight range control.
- Enhanced MMI Multi Media Interface with touchpad & handwriting recognition for the phone and navigation system, using Nvidia Tegra system on a chip for very high processing speed.
- Optional 1,400 watt Bang & Olufsen sound system.
- Driver assistance systems networked using FlexRay technology.
- Hard disk drive GPS navigation with 3D computer graphics with Google Earth.
- Navigation system coordinates input to the adaptive headlights, transmission, adaptive cruise control and electronic stability control.
- Infrared Night Vision Assistant with pedestrian recognition.
- Broadband internet with UMTS 3G and WLAN-Hotspot.
- First production Audi with a Collision avoidance system: Pre sense (similar to Mercedes-Benz Pre-Safe). The full version of the system (Pre Sense Plus) works in four phases. In the first phase, the system provides warning of an impending accident, while the hazard warning lights are activated, the side windows and sunroof are closed and the front seat belts are tensioned. In the second phase, the warning is followed by light braking, strong enough to win the driver's attention. The third phase initiates autonomous partial braking at a rate of 3 m/s^{2} (9.8 ft/s^{2}). The fourth phase decelerates the car at 5 m/s^{2} (16.4 ft/s^{2}) followed by automatic deceleration at full braking power, roughly half a second before projected impact. A second system, called (Pre Sense Rear), is designed to reduce the consequences of rear-end collisions. The sunroof and windows are closed and seat belts are prepared for impact. The optional memory seats are moved forward to protect the car's occupants. The system uses sensor fusion with twin radar and a mono camera, and was introduced in 2010.

==== A8 L (2010) ====
The vehicle was unveiled at Auto China 2010, followed by the 2011 Taipei Motor Show (A8 L W12 quattro).

German models went on sale in the fall of 2010. Early models include a 3.0 TFSI quattro (290PS), a 4.2 FSI quattro (372PS), a W12 6.3 FSI quattro (500PS), a 3.0 TDI quattro (250PS) and a 4.2 TDI quattro (350PS).

Taiwan models went on sale on 11 November 2010. Early models include a 3.0 TFSI quattro (290PS) and a 4.2 FSI quattro (372PS). The A8L W12 quattro was added in 2011. The A8L 4.0 TFSI quattro was added in 2012.

Chinese models went on sale in 2011. Early models include an A8L 3.0 TFSI low quattro (289PS), and an A8L 3.0 TFSI high quattro (333PS).

==== A8 hybrid concept (2010) ====
The concept vehicle includes a 2.0 TFSI engine rated at 211 PS (155 kW; 208 hp) and 350 N⋅m (258.15 lbf⋅ft) of torque at 1,500–4,200 rpm, a disc-shaped electric motor rated at 45 PS (33 kW; 44 hp) and 211 N⋅m (155.63 lbf⋅ft) of torque, lithium-ion battery, luggage space of 400 litres (14.13 cubic feet), 21-inch wheels with 265/35 tires, Prism Silver body colour with Spectra Flair accent colour, 'hybrid' lettering on both front fenders and illuminated doorsteps with 'hybrid' insignias.

The vehicle was unveiled in 2010 at the Geneva Motor Show.

==== A8 L long-term evolution broadband prototype (2011) ====
It is a version of the A8 L demonstrating 4G long-term evolution (LTE) broadband technology. Developed in collaboration with Alcatel-Lucent, the car's mobile broadband connection is a fourth generation (‘4G’) technology with data transfer speeds of up to 100 Mbit/s.

During the 2011 Consumer Electronics Show in Las Vegas, Rupert Stadler, chairman of the Board of Management of AUDI AG, announced that LTE technology would be used in cars by early 2011. The A8 L prototype was unveiled weeks later.

==== A8 L Security (2011–2017) ====
The A8 L Security is an armoured version of the A8 L with class VR 7 ballistic protection standard (tested as per BRV 2009 guidelines), resistance to explosions against a military hand grenade (tested as per ERV 2010 guidelines), with certain areas of the armouring complies with the criteria for class VR 9 and VR 10, a core safety cell made from hot-formed armoured steel, aramid fabric, ceramics, special alloyed aluminium and multilayer glass; overlapping protective materials at the joints, aluminum side sills with solid steel sections, aluminum alloy armored floor, side windows, windshield and rear window made of special glass with a polycarbonate coating; optional electromechanical window openers, closing assist feature comes standard for the doors, communication box in the luggage compartment (light ceramic doors, aluminum frame), optional battery and the fuel tank protection, two-way communication system with a speaker in the single-frame grille and microphones for the cabin and exterior, an emergency exit system with pyrotechnical separating screws in the hinges, fire extinguisher system, emergency fresh-air system with two oxygen cartridges, a smoke extractor for the passenger compartment, an LED signaling system for convoy travel, flashing lights, a siren, a preparation for professional mobile radio systems, a flag holder, a permanently installed telephone, an accident data recorder, an additional rearview camera and a heated windshield plus partially heated side windows, four-zone climate control system with an ionizer to freshen the air, electric rear blinds, the sonorous Bose surround sound system and a TV tuner. In the rear are two individual seats with power adjustment, front comfort seats with heating and optional massage and ventilation functions, standard full-leather package, optional relaxation seat (adjustable right-hand rear seat with a power-adjustable footrest, heating and massage), optional center console with large storage compartments and rear seat entertainment system with two 10.2-inch displays, optional folding table, optional refrigerator, optional parking heater, Bluetooth car phone online, integrated UMTS module, optional separate telephone handsets, 19-inch forged wheels featuring semipolished two-tone finishing, 255/720 tires with a high load index of 117, synthetic rings on the rims, and an optional full-size spare tire.

The first model includes a W12 engine rated at 368 kW; 493 hp (500 PS) and 625 N⋅m (461 lbf⋅ft) of torque. Deliveries began in late summer 2011. An additional engine model with improved fuel efficiency went on sale in 2012.

The vehicle was unveiled at the 2011 Geneva Motor Show.

Deliveries began in late summer 2011.

==== A8 hybrid (2012) ====
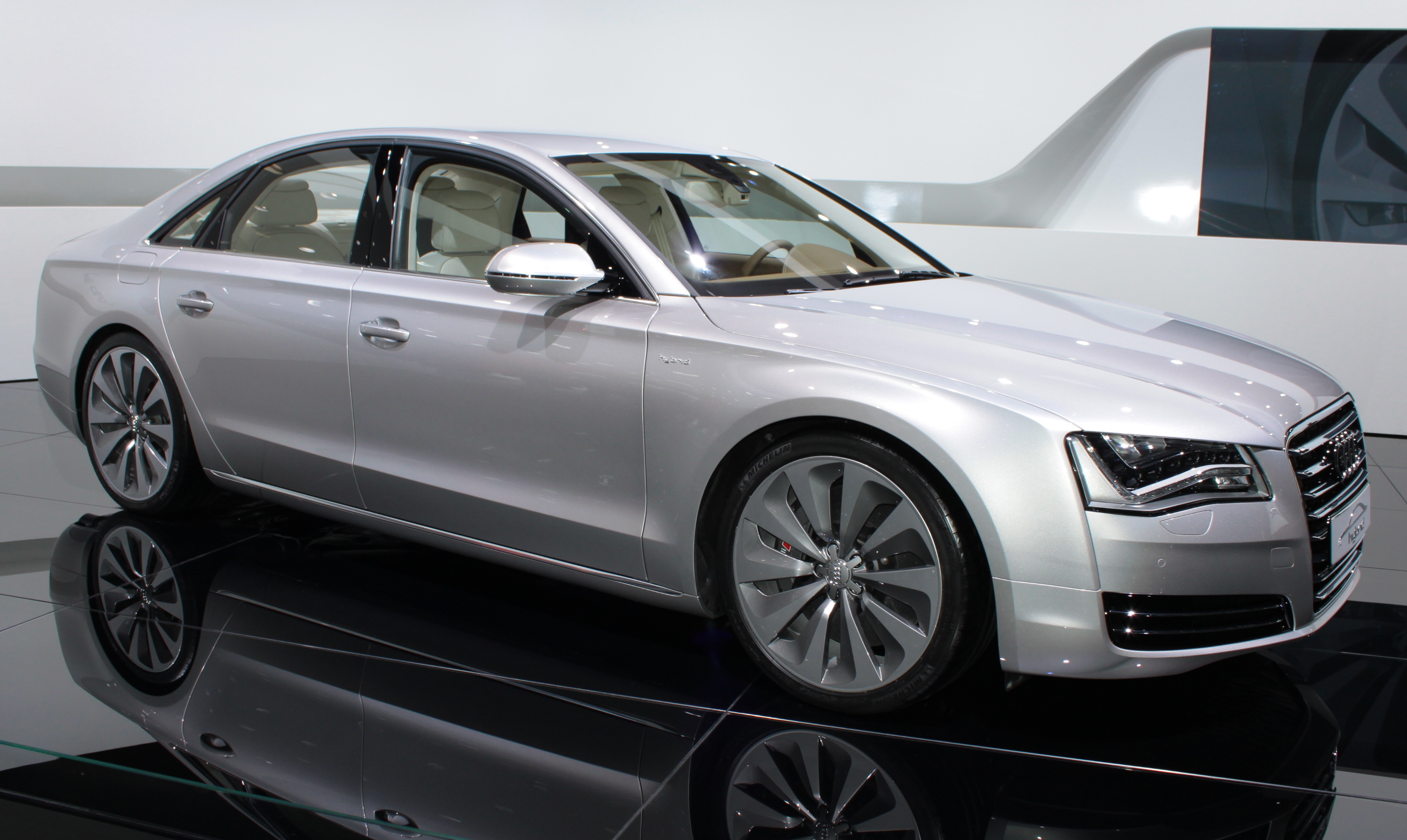
2011 Audi A8 Hybrid

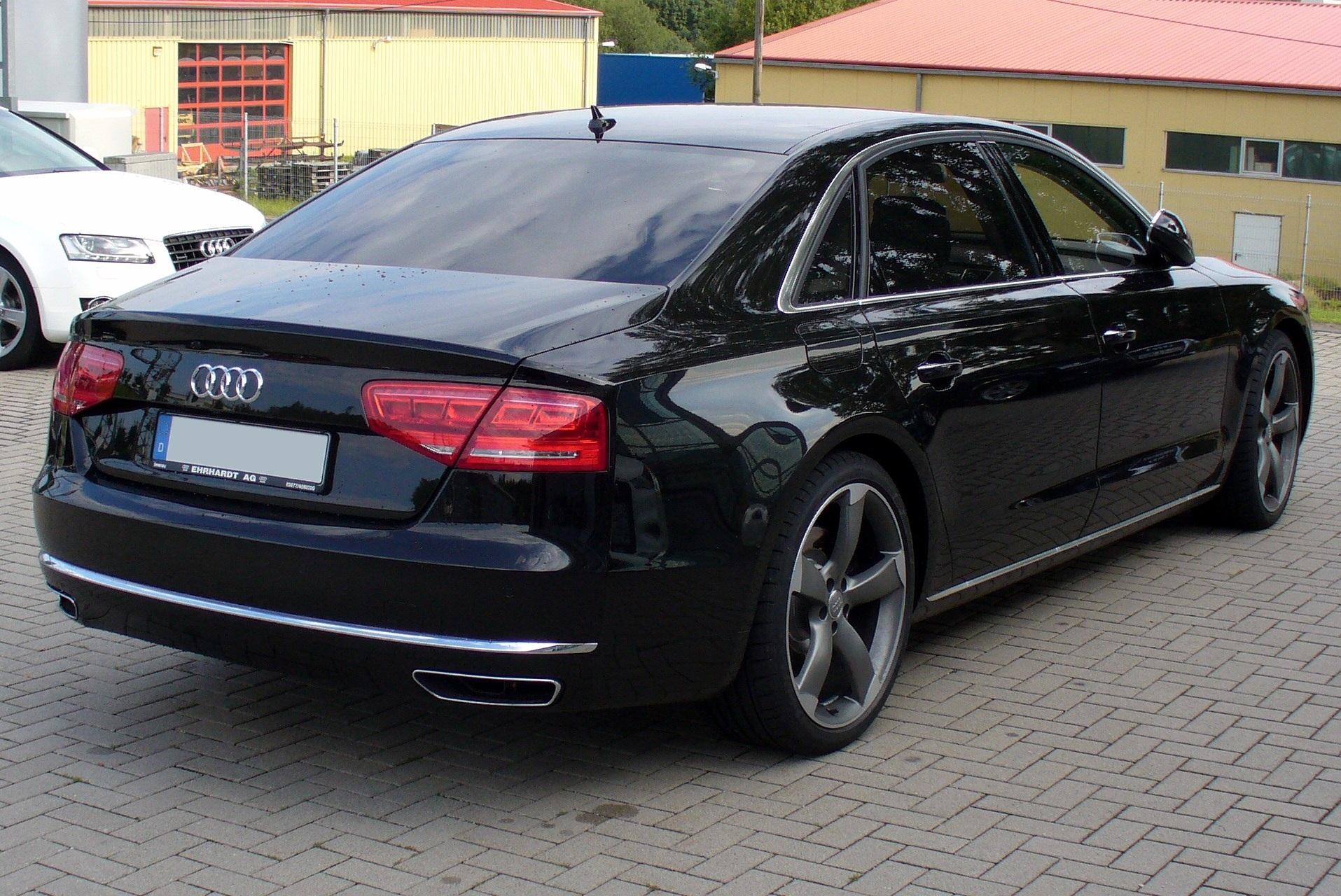
Audi A8 L (Europe; pre-facelift)

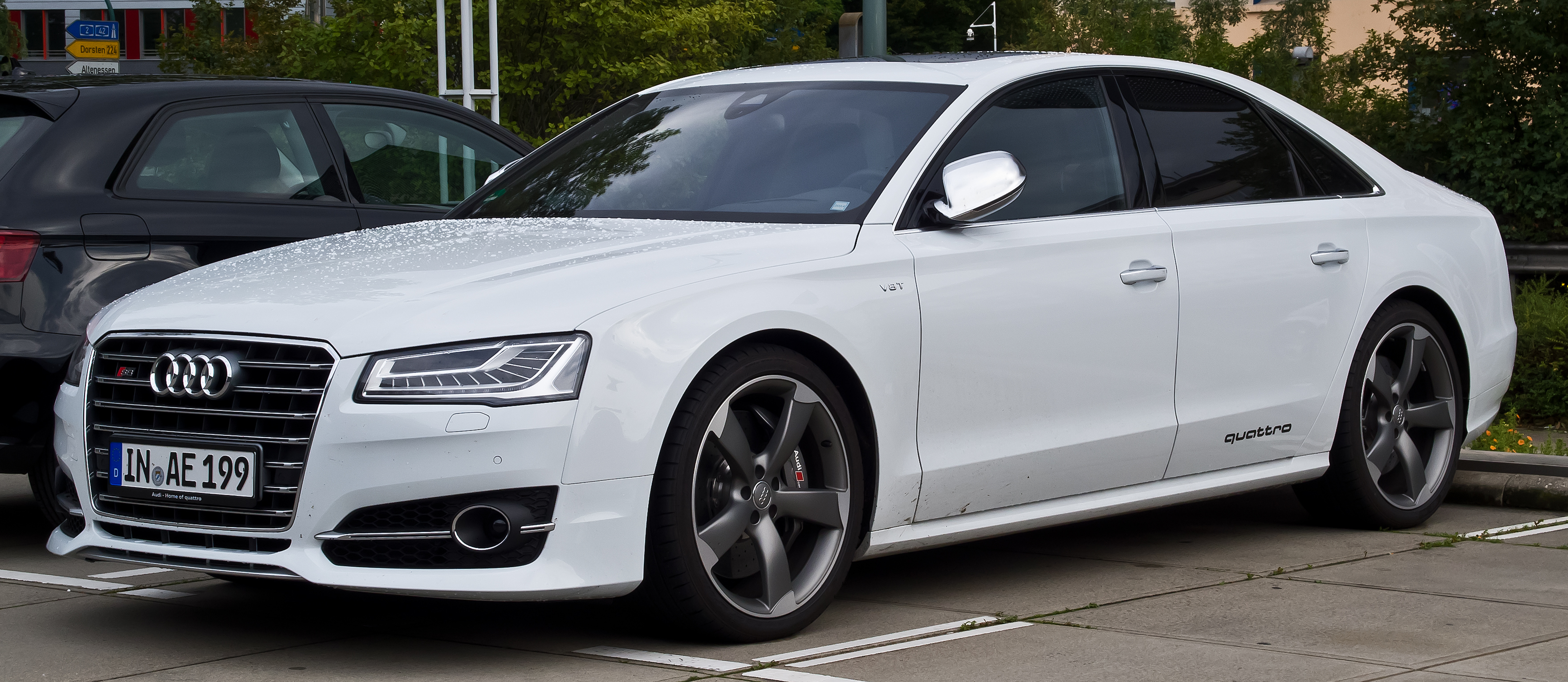
Audi S8 (facelift)

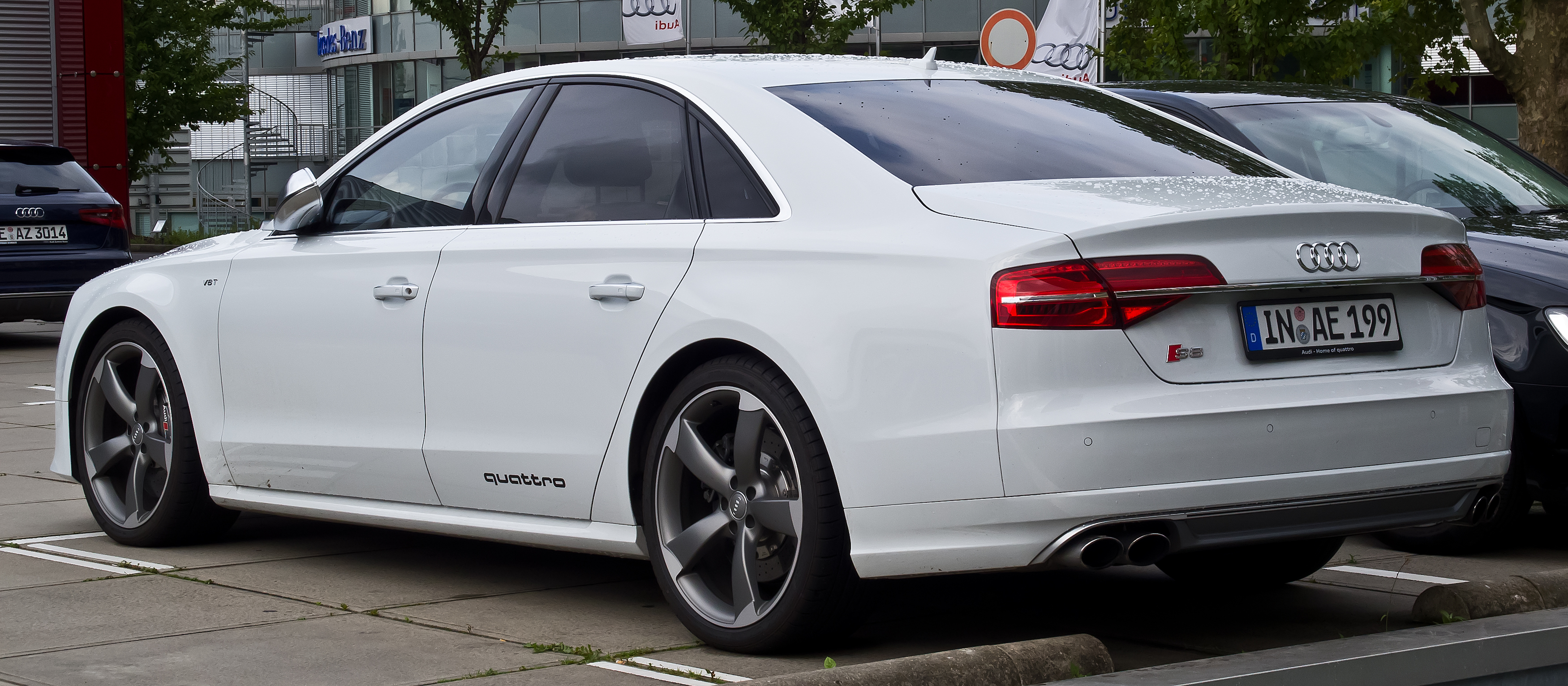
Audi S8 (facelift)

The production version of the A8 hybrid includes an electric motor rated at 40 kW; 53 hp (54 PS) and 210 N⋅m (155 lbf⋅ft) of torque, 1.25 kWh lithium-ion battery, 18-inch 10-spoke alloy wheels in turbine blades design (optional 19-inch), hybrid badges, metallic paint finish (optional Arctic Silver body colour), three-zone automatic air conditioning, LED headlights, and a BOSE sound system. Pure electric mode is available for either a top speed of 100 km/h (62 mph) or for up to 3 km (2 mi) at a constant speed of 60 km/h (37 mph). It went on sale in 2012.

The vehicle was unveiled at the 2011 Frankfurt Motor Show.

==== A8 L W12 Audi exclusive concept ====
It is a limited (50 units) version of the A8 L W12 with seats upholstered in Cognac-colored leather by Poltrona Frau, inlays made from the wood olive ash natural, light gray-brown veneer, sill trims with "Audi exclusive concept" lettering, and deep-pile carpeting.

The vehicle was unveiled at the 2011 Frankfurt Motor Show.

==== A8 L hybrid ====
The long wheelbase version of the A8 hybrid was unveiled in 2010 at the Beijing Auto Show.

==== S8 4.0 TFSI quattro (2012) ====
The D4 series Audi S8 4.0 TFSI quattro went on sale in 2012. The D4 S8 was based on the A8 platform, considered in America to be the "short wheel base" comparative to the A8L. Like the previous iteration, the D4 S8 costs less than the A8 L W12.

The S8 can accelerate from 0 to 100 km/h (0 to 62 mph) in 4.2 seconds. It is powered by a 4.0-litre TFSI biturbo V8 engine with 382 kW (512 hp). The engine utilises cylinder deactivation so it can run as a V4 for better fuel economy. The S8's engine is shared with the Bentley Continental GT, while a detuned variant of the engine makes 420 hp (313 kW; 426 PS) which is found in the 2013 Audi S6, Audi S7, and Audi A8. Direct competitors include the BMW Alpina B7 and Mercedes-Benz S63 AMG, which also have biturbo V8 engines.

The vehicle was unveiled at the 2011 Frankfurt Motor Show, and went on sale in spring 2012.

Taiwan models went on sale in 2013.

The S8 was discontinued in the United States of America, to be replaced by the S8 Plus for the latest iteration of this generation before the facelift in 2018. In other parts of the world, customers had the choice between the two variants.

==== S8 Plus 4.0 TFSI quattro (2016) ====
Based on the same chassis and underpinnings as the D4 S8, the D4 S8 Plus became the sole option for ordering the S8-variant of the Audi A8 line in the US, in the 2016 and 2017 model years. The S8 Plus was dialed up to 605 hp (451 kW) out of the same powerplant as the previous S8, by remapping the turbo boost and fuel delivery of the engine. Additionally, the Carbon Ceramic braking system is standard on the S8 Plus in some markets. The vast majority of options on the S8 Plus were identical to the previous S8; however, it had darkened tail lights standard, and the option for adding carbon fiber styling elements such as the mirror caps, rear lip spoiler, rear diffuser, and front lip. Different markets had different standard packages combining elements of the external carbon package, the dynamic package and the interior design package. A highly optioned build of the S8 Plus would outprice the nominally higher-end A8 L W12 whose production ceased after the 2018 model year. Unlike the regular S8 which was built by Audi on the regular assembly line alongside other A8 variants, the S8 Plus was built by Audi Sport (formerly Quattro GmbH) and has a VIN that starts with WUA to identify it.

==== Engines ====
Petrol engines
Model	Years	Type	Power at rpm	Torque at rpm	Acceleration 0–100 km/h (62 mph) (sec)	max speed
A8 (L) 2.0 TFSI hybrid	2012–2018	1,984 cc (121.1 cu in) I4 turbo	211 PS (155 kW; 208 bhp) at TBC	350 N⋅m (258.15 lbf⋅ft) at 1,500–4,200	7.7	235 km/h (146 mph)
A8 (L) 2.0 TFSI hybrid	2012–2018	electric motor, 1.3 kWh lithium-ion battery	54 PS (40 kW; 53 bhp) at TBC	210 N⋅m (154.89 lbf⋅ft) at TBC	7.7	235 km/h (146 mph)
A8 (L) 2.0 TFSI hybrid	2012–2018	combined	245 PS (180 kW; 242 bhp) at TBC	480 N⋅m (354.03 lbf⋅ft) at TBC	7.7	235 km/h (146 mph)
A8 (L) 3.0 TFSI quattro (290PS)	2010–2012	2,995 cc (182.8 cu in) V6 supercharged	290 PS (213 kW; 286 bhp) at 4,850–6,500	420 N⋅m (310 lb⋅ft) at 2,500–4,850	6.1 / 6.2	250 km/h (155 mph) (limited)
A8 (L) 3.0 TFSI quattro (333PS)	2012–2018	2,995 cc (182.8 cu in) V6 supercharged	333 PS (245 kW; 328 bhp) at 5,500–6,500	440 N⋅m (325 lb⋅ft) at 2,900–5,300	5.5	250 km/h (155 mph) (limited)
A8 (L) 4.0 TFSI quattro	2012–2013	3,991 cc (243.5 cu in) V8 twin turbo	420 PS (309 kW; 414 bhp) at 5000	600 N⋅m (443 lb⋅ft) at 1,500	4.5 / 4,6	250 km/h (155 mph) (limited)
A8 (L) 4.0 TFSI quattro	2013–2018	3,993 cc (243.7 cu in) V8 twin turbo	435 PS (320 kW; 429 bhp) at 5,000	600 N⋅m (443 lb⋅ft) at 1,500–4,500	4.5 / 4.6	250 km/h (155 mph) (limited)
A8 (L) 4.2 FSI quattro	2010–2012	4,163 cc (254.0 cu in) V8	372 PS (274 kW; 367 bhp) at 6,800	445 N⋅m (328 lb⋅ft) at 3,500	5.7	250 km/h (155 mph) (limited)
A8 L 6.3 W12 quattro	2010–2018	6,299 cc (384.4 cu in) W12	500 PS (368 kW; 493 bhp) at 6,200	625 N⋅m (461 lb⋅ft) at 3,250 (2010–2011); 625 N⋅m (461 lb⋅ft) at 4,750 (2012–)	4.9 (2010); 4.7 (2011–)	250 km/h (155 mph) (limited)
A8 L 6.3 W12 quattro (North America)	2010–2018	6,299 cc (384.4 cu in) W12	500 PS (368 kW; 493 bhp) at 6,200	628 N⋅m (463 lb⋅ft) at 4,750 (2012–)	4.4 (2012–)	250 km/h (155 mph) (limited)
A8 L 6.3 Security W12 quattro	2011–2018	6,299 cc (384.4 cu in) W12	500 PS (368 kW; 493 bhp)	625 N⋅m (461 lb⋅ft) at 4,750	4.3	210 km/h (130 mph)
S8 4.0 TFSI quattro	2012–2018	3,993 cc (243.7 cu in) V8 twin turbo	520 PS (382 kW; 513 bhp) at 6,000	650 N⋅m (479 lb⋅ft) at 1,700–5,500	4.2	250 km/h (155 mph) (limited)
S8 Plus 4.0 TFSI quattro	2016–2018	3,993 cc (243.7 cu in) V8 twin turbo	605 PS (445 kW; 597 bhp) at 6,100-6,800	700 N⋅m (516 lb⋅ft) at 1,750–6,000	3.8	305 km/h (190 mph) (limited)

Common rail Diesel engines
Model	Years	Type	Power at rpm	Torque at rpm	Acceleration 0–100 km/h (62 mph) (sec)	max speed
A8 3.0 TDI (204PS)	2011–2018	2,967 cc (181.1 cu in) V6 turbo	204 PS (150 kW; 201 bhp) at 3,750–4,500	400 N⋅m (295 lb⋅ft) at 1,250–3,500	8.0	235 km/h (146 mph)
A8 (L) 3.0 TDI quattro (250PS)	2010–2018	2,967 cc (181.1 cu in) V6 turbo	250 PS (184 kW; 247 bhp) at 4,000–4,500	550 N⋅m (406 lb⋅ft) at 1500–3000	6.1/6.2	250 km/h (155 mph) (limited)
A8 (L) 3.0 TDI clean diesel quattro (250PS)	2010–2019	2,967 cc (181.1 cu in) V6 turbo	250 PS (184 kW; 247 bhp) at 4,000–4,500	550 N⋅m (406 lb⋅ft) at 1500–3000	6.1/6.2	250 km/h (155 mph) (limited)
A8 (L) 4.2 TDI quattro	2010–2018	4,134 cc (252.3 cu in) V8 twin-turbo	350 PS (257 kW; 345 bhp) at 4,000	800 N⋅m (590 lb⋅ft) at 1,750–2,750	5.5/5.6	250 km/h (155 mph) (limited)

==== Marketing ====
As part of the Audi A8 launch in Taiwan, Audi built an Audi pavilion in Xin-Yi district, with Tom Dixon invited for the launch event. Yu-Cheng Chou and Chun-Ten Lin's art works were displayed with A8. The Audi A8 3.0 TFSI quattro (290PS) was used in Transporter: The Series. Audi S8 was used in Avengers: Age of Ultron, alongside Spider-Man: Homecoming.

=== 2013 model year update ===
Early German A8 models include 3.0 TFSI quattro (290PS), 4.0 TFSI quattro (420PS), 3.0 TDI (204PS), 3.0 TDI quattro (250PS), 3.0 TDI clean diesel quattro (250PS), 4.2 TDI quattro (350PS), A8 L W12 quattro (500PS), A8 hybrid 2.0 TFSI. Early German A8 L Security models include 4.0 TFSI quattro, W12 6.3 FSI quattro.

The updated A8 uses LED headlight technology, with automatic high beam lighting. Osram supplies the LEDs, while Hella supplies the headlamp itself.

Early US models include the A8(L) 3.0 TFSI quattro (333PS), the A8(L) 4.0 TFSI quattro, the S8 4.0 TFSI quattro and the A8 L W12 6.3 FSI quattro. The A8 3.0 TFSI quattro and A8 4.0 TFSI quattro replaced the A8 4.2 FSI quattro. The A8 3.0 TDI clean diesel quattro (240PS) was unveiled at the 2012 L.A. Auto Show, and was set to go on sale in Spring 2013 as a 2014 model year vehicle. The A8 L 3.0 TDI clean diesel quattro (240PS) was set to go on sale in Spring 2013 on sale as a 2014 model year vehicle.

Chinese models include the A8L 30 FSI (204PS), the A8L 40 hybrid, the A8L 45 TFSI quattro (290PS), the A8L 55 TFSI quattro (333PS), the A8L W12 FSI quattro and the S8 4.0 TFSI quattro.

==== Engines ====
Petrol engines
Model	Years	Type	Power at rpm	Torque at rpm	Acceleration 0–100 km/h (62 mph) (sec)	max speed
A8 2.0 TFSI hybrid	2012–2017	1,984 cc (121.1 cu in) I4 turbo	211 PS (155 kW; 208 bhp) at 4,300–6,000	350 N⋅m (258.15 lbf⋅ft) at 1,500–4,200	7.7	235 km/h (146 mph)
A8 2.0 TFSI hybrid	2012–2017	electric motor, 1.3 kWh lithium-ion battery	54 PS (40 kW; 53 bhp) at TBC	210 N⋅m (154.89 lbf⋅ft) at TBC	7.7	235 km/h (146 mph)
A8 2.0 TFSI hybrid	2012–2017	combined	245 PS (180 kW; 242 bhp) at TBC	480 N⋅m (354.03 lbf⋅ft) at TBC	7.7	235 km/h (146 mph)
A8 L 2.0 TFSI hybrid	2013–2017	1,984 cc (121.1 cu in) I4 turbo	211 PS (155 kW; 208 bhp) at 4,300–6000	350 N⋅m (258.15 lbf⋅ft) at 1,500–4,200	7.9	228 km/h (142 mph)
A8 L 2.0 TFSI hybrid	2013–2017	electric motor, 1.3 kWh lithium-ion battery	54 PS (40 kW; 53 bhp) at TBC	210 N⋅m (154.89 lbf⋅ft) at TBC	7.9	228 km/h (142 mph)
A8 L 2.0 TFSI hybrid	2013–2017	combined	245 PS (180 kW; 242 bhp) at TBC	480 N⋅m (354.03 lbf⋅ft) at TBC	7.9	228 km/h (142 mph)
A8L 30 FSI (front wheel drive) (China)	2012–2017	2,498 cc (152.4 cu in) V6	204 PS (150 kW; 201 bhp) at 5,800	250 N⋅m (184 lb⋅ft) at 3,000–4,750	9.6	237 km/h (147 mph)
A8 (L) 3.0 TFSI quattro (290PS)	2012–2017	2,995 cc (182.8 cu in) V6 supercharged	290 PS (213 kW; 286 bhp) at 4,850–6,500	420 N⋅m (310 lb⋅ft) at 2,500–4,850	6.1/6.2	250 km/h (155 mph) (limited)
A8 (L) 3.0 TFSI quattro (333PS)	2012–2017	2,995 cc (182.8 cu in) V6 supercharged	333 PS (245 kW; 328 bhp) at 5,500–6,500	440 N⋅m (325 lb⋅ft) at 2,900–5,300	5.5/5.5	250 km/h (155 mph) (limited)
A8 (L) 3.0 TFSI quattro (333PS) (North America)	2012–2017	2,995 cc (182.8 cu in) V6 supercharged	333 PS (245 kW; 328 bhp) at 5,500–6,500	440 N⋅m (325 lb⋅ft) at 2,900–5,300	5.5/5.5	210 km/h (130 mph) (limited)
A8 (L) 4.0 TFSI quattro	2012–2017	3,993 cc (243.7 cu in) V8 twin turbo (VW EA 824)	420 PS (309 kW; 414 bhp) at 5,000	600 N⋅m (443 lb⋅ft) at 1,500–4,500	4.6/4.7	250 km/h (155 mph) (limited)
A8 (L) 4.0 TFSI quattro (North America)	2012–2017	3,991 cc (243.5 cu in) V8 twin turbo (VW EA 824)	420 PS (309 kW; 414 bhp) at 5,000	602 N⋅m (444 lb⋅ft) at 1,500	4.7/4.8	210 km/h (130 mph) (limited)
A8L 50 TFSI quattro (333PS) (China)	2012–2017	2,995 cc (182.8 cu in) V6 supercharged	333 PS (245 kW; 328 bhp) at 5,500–6,500	440 N⋅m (325 lb⋅ft) at 2,900–5,300	6.0	250 km/h (155 mph) (limited)
A8L 55 TFSI quattro (420PS) (China)	2012–2017	3,993 cc (243.7 cu in) V8 twin turbo	420 PS (309 kW; 414 bhp) at 5,000–6,000	600 N⋅m (443 lb⋅ft) at 1,500–4,500	4.7	250 km/h (155 mph) (limited)
A8 L W12 6.3 FSI quattro	2012–2017	6,299 cc (384.4 cu in) W12 (VW/Audi Group CEJA)	500 PS (368 kW; 493 bhp) at 6,200	625 N⋅m (461 lb⋅ft) at 4,750	4.7	250 km/h (155 mph) (limited)
A8 L W12 6.3 FSI quattro (North America)	2012–2017	6,299 cc (384.4 cu in) W12 (VW/Audi Group CEJA)	500 PS (368 kW; 493 bhp) at 6,200	628 N⋅m (463 lb⋅ft) at 4,750	4.4	210 km/h (130 mph) (limited)
A8 L Security 4.0 TFSI quattro	2012–2017	3,993 cc (243.7 cu in) V8 twin turbo	TBC	TBC	TBC	TBC
A8 L Security W12 6.3 FSI quattro	2012–2017	6,299 cc (384.4 cu in) W12	500 PS (368 kW; 493 bhp)	625 N⋅m (461 lb⋅ft) at 4,750	7.3	210 km/h (130 mph)
S8 4.0 TFSI quattro	2012–2017	3,993 cc (243.7 cu in) V8 twin turbo (VW EA 824)	520 PS (382 kW; 513 bhp) at 6,000	650 N⋅m (479 lb⋅ft) at 1,700–5,500	4.2	250 km/h (155 mph) (limited)
S8 4.0 TFSI quattro (North America)	2012–2017	3,993 cc (243.7 cu in) V8 twin turbo (VW EA 824)	520 PS (382 kW; 513 bhp) at 6,000	650 N⋅m (479 lb⋅ft) at 1,700–5,500	4.1	250 km/h (155 mph) (limited)

Common rail Diesel engines
Model	Years	Type	Power at rpm	Torque at rpm	Acceleration 0–100 km/h (62 mph) (sec)	max speed
A8 3.0 TDI (204PS)	2012–2017	2,967 cc (181.1 cu in) V6 turbo	204 PS (150 kW; 201 bhp) at 3,750–4,500	400 N⋅m (295 lb⋅ft) at 1,250–3,500	7.9	235 km/h (146 mph)
A8 (L) 3.0 TDI quattro (250PS)	2012–2017	2,967 cc (181.1 cu in) V6 turbo	250 PS (184 kW; 247 bhp) at 4,000–4,500	550 N⋅m (406 lb⋅ft) at 1,500–3,000	6.1/6.2	250 km/h (155 mph) (limited)
A8 (L) 3.0 TDI clean diesel quattro (240PS) (North America)	2013–2017	2,967 cc (181.1 cu in) V6 turbo	240 PS (177 kW; 237 bhp) at TBC	550 N⋅m (406 lb⋅ft) at 1,500–3,000	6.4/6.4	250 km/h (155 mph)
A8 (L) 3.0 TDI clean diesel quattro (250PS)	2012–2017	2,967 cc (181.1 cu in) V6 turbo	250 PS (184 kW; 247 bhp) at 4,000–4,500	550 N⋅m (406 lb⋅ft) at 1,500–3,000	6.1/6.2	250 km/h (155 mph) (limited)
A8 (L) 4.2 TDI quattro	2012–2017	4,134 cc (252.3 cu in) V8 twin-turbo	350 PS (257 kW; 345 bhp) at 4,000	800 N⋅m (590 lb⋅ft) at 1,750–2,750	5.5/5.6	250 km/h (155 mph) (limited)

The A8 L 2.0 TFSI hybrid is sold as an A8L 40 hybrid in China.

The A8 L 3.0 TFSI quattro (290PS) is sold as an A8L 45 TFSI quattro in China.

==== Transmission ====
All models include an eight-speed Tiptronic transmission.

==== Recalls ====
2013–2014 Audi A8 and S8 vehicles equipped with a standard sunroof, manufactured between 12 March 2013, and 15 July 2013, were recalled due to possible shattering of sunroof glass panel.

==== Marketing ====
As part of the 2013 S8 4.0 TFSI quattro launch in the US, a TV commercial called 'Suspect' was produced in association with Venables Bell & Partners, USA, Furlined, The Whitehouse, 740 Sound Design & Mix, Lime Studios; starring Abigail Spencer. The ad takes cues from quintessential heist films with the S8 taking center stage against a mysterious and suspenseful bank robbery scene. The spot closes with the tagline "Heighten Every Moment." The commercial was premiered during the 2012 NFL season kick-off game on 5 September 2012. The "Suspect" commercial featuring the Audi S8 also aired on CBS and NBC, and select cable networks, including: Food, FX, National Geographic, ESPN, USA, CNN, and AMC. A 30-second version would also be viewable on CNN.com, Reuters.com, Wired.com, Yahoo! and more.

=== 2014 model year facelift ===
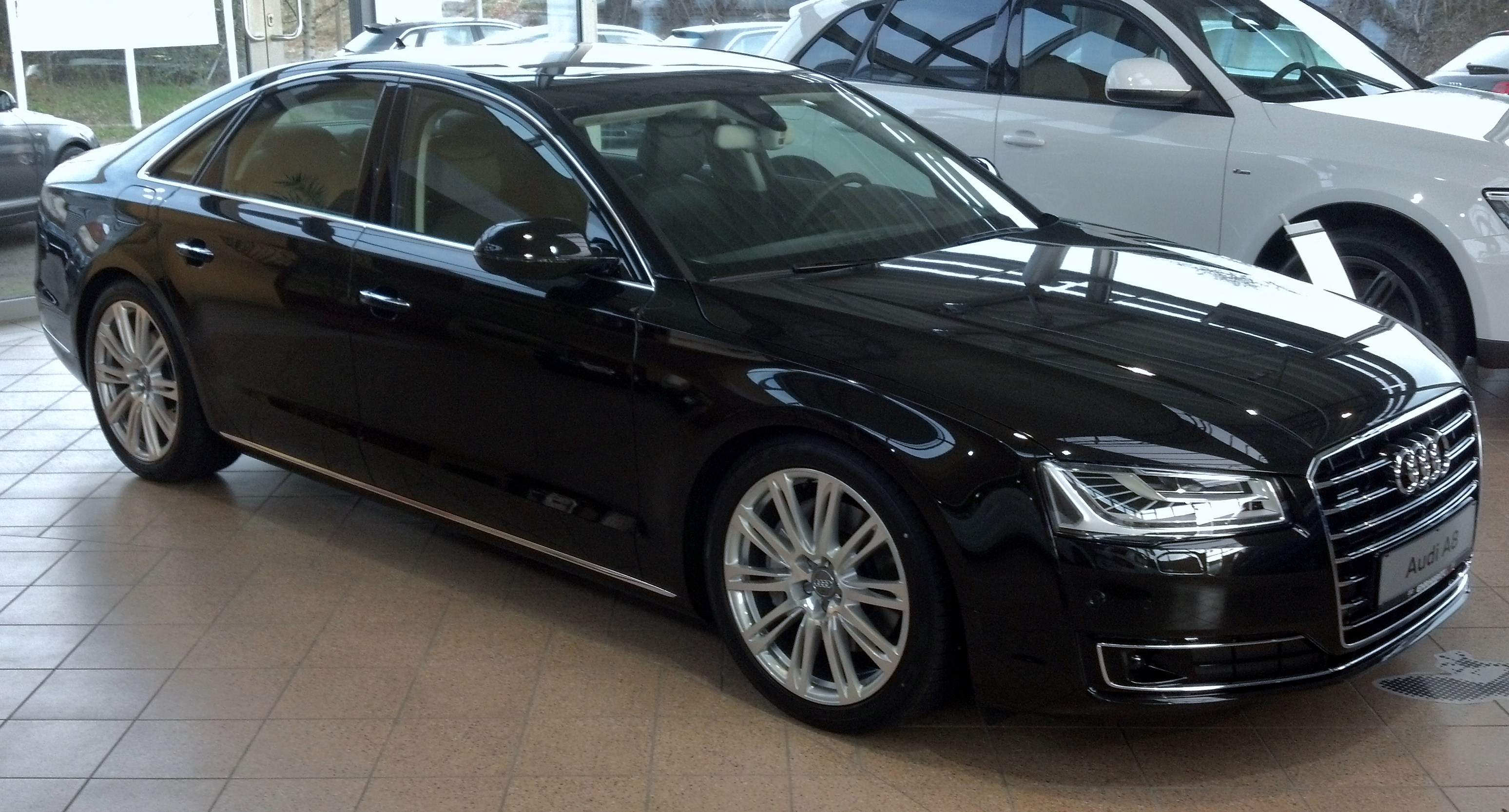

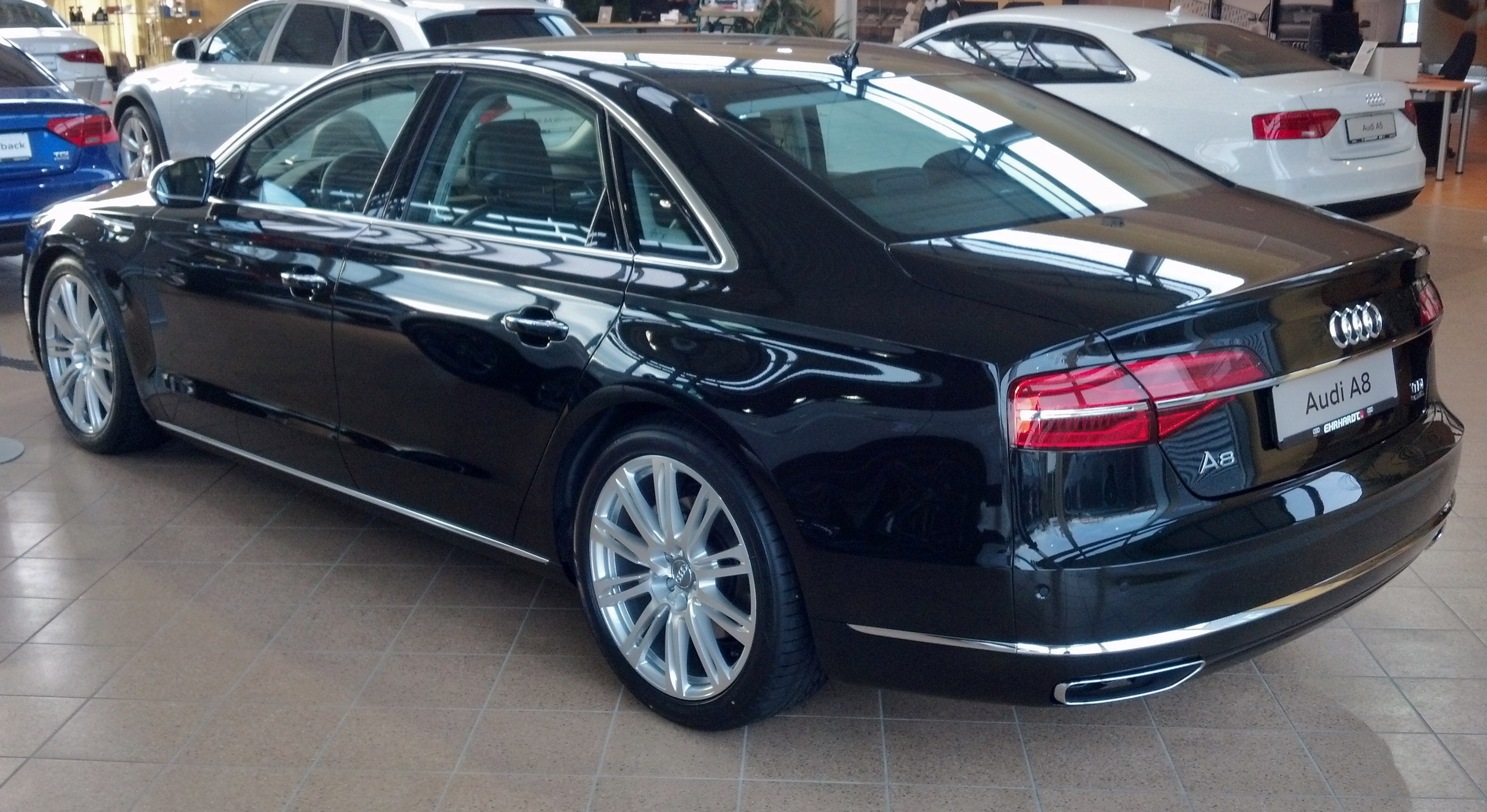
MY14 facelift Audi A8 (Europe)

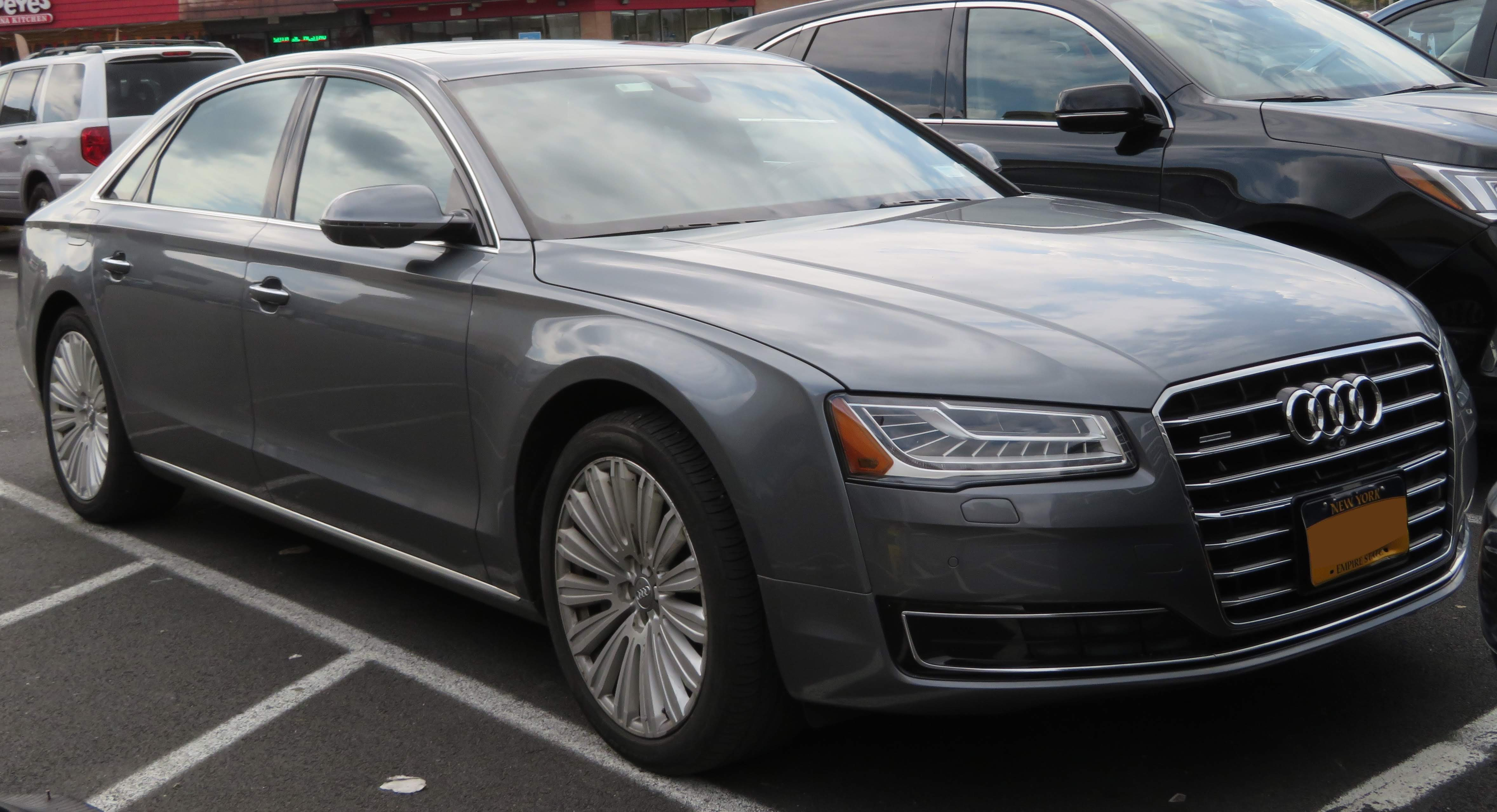
MY14 Audi A8 L (US)

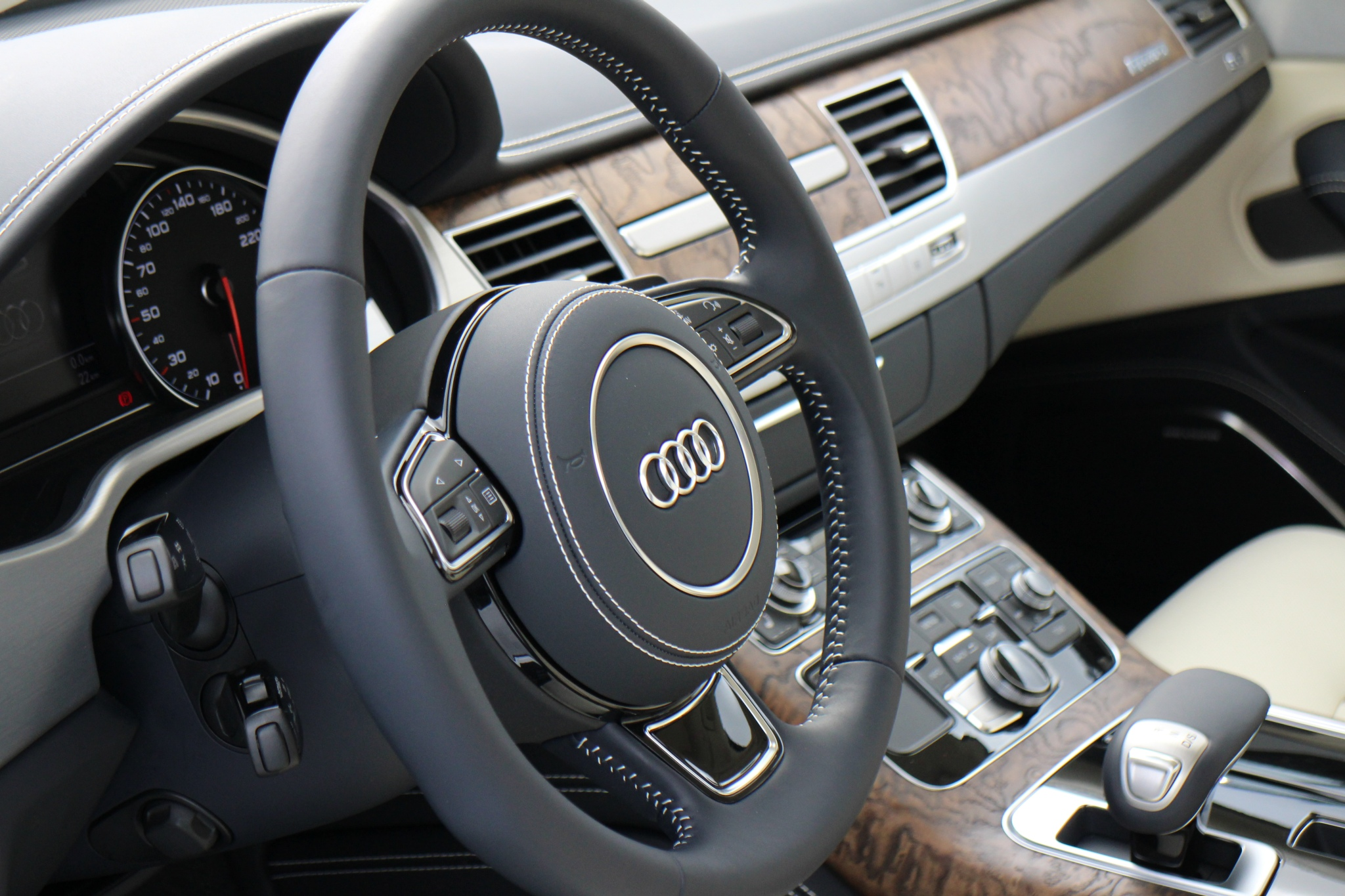
Interior

==== A8, S8, A8 Audi exclusive concept, A8 hybrid (2013) ====
Changes include:

- First worldwide series production car with digitally controlled, full-LED glare-free adaptive highbeam: Matrix LED. The high-beam comprises 25 individual light-emitting diodes per unit that can be switched on and off or dimmed individually depending on the situation. This enables the headlight system to react extremely precisely to other vehicles while always brightly illuminating the road. Additional features of the new headlights are the intelligent cornering light, new-look daytime running lights and dynamic turn signals. The lighting system in the A8 uses predictive route data from the navigation system to adjust the distribution of light in response to the current driving situation. In combination with the optional Navigation plus with MMI touch, the system recognizes route data contained in the navigation system, such as curves and road classifications.
- Cornering light: Using predictive route data supplied by the MMI navigation plus, the focus of the Matrix LED beam is shifted towards the bend even before the driver turns the steering wheel.
- Night Vision Assistant can now recognize larger animals in addition to pedestrians. Pedestrian Marker Lights work together with the optional night vision assistant. As soon as a pedestrian is detected in a critical range in front of the vehicle, individual LEDs flash briefly three times in succession to alert that person, who is then clearly visible to the driver.
- Head-up display
- Standard electromechanical power steering (optional dynamic steering varies its ratio with the car's speed)
- Active lane assist, which makes slight steering adjustments when necessary
- Park assist system with 360° display
- Side assist blind spot monitor coupled with expanded version of the standard pre sense basic safety system
- Active noise cancellation (ANC) for A8 L W12 quattro, cylinder on demand with six-cylinder mode.
- Additional noise damping
- Other changes: altered trunk layout with optional power trunk closing assist, flatter rear LED lights joined by a continuous chrome strip, redesigned bumper houses two rhomboid tailpipes (except S8), available wheel sizes up to 21 inches with 275/35-series tires, optional sport differential (standard on S8 and A8 4.2 TDI clean diesel quattro)

The A8 Audi Exclusive Concept is a limited (50 units) version of the A8 L W12 quattro with interior leather upholstery from Italian furniture manufacturer Poltrona Frau in the color Agatha cognac, inlays are made of fine grain olive ash natural silver brown, Tierra Del Fuego body colour. Production was set to begin at the quattro GmbH facility in Neckarsulm starting in March 2014.

The Audi S8 includes a four-cylinder mode with ANC, two elliptical dual tailpipes, dynamic steering, sport differential, adaptive air suspension sport with an S-specific setup, 20-inch wheels, S8 emblems on front brake calipers, optional Audi design selection black/Vermont brown with Carbon twill copper inlays.

The Audi A8 hybrid includes a custom Audi luggage set for the trunk.

The vehicles were unveiled at the 2013 Frankfurt Motor Show, followed by the 2014 Detroit Auto Show and the 2014 Toronto Auto Show.

German models arrived at German Audi dealerships in November 2013. Early A8 models include 3.0 TFSI quattro (310PS), 4.0 TFSI quattro (435PS), 3.0 TDI quattro clean diesel (258PS), 4.2 TDI clean diesel quattro (385PS), A8 L W12 quattro (500PS), A8 hybrid 2.0 TFSI (211/245PS), S8 4.0 TFSI quattro (520PS).

US models went on sale as 2015 model year vehicles. Early models included A8 3.0 (L) TFSI quattro (310PS), A8 (L) 4.0 TFSI quattro (435PS), A8 L 3.0 TDI quattro clean diesel (258PS), A8 L W12 quattro (500PS), S8 4.0 TFSI quattro (520PS).

Engines are the same in Canada as the US but PS ratings are higher due to less emission control devices needed.

==== A8 L Security (2014) ====
Available in V8 4.0 TFSI or W12 FSI engines, the A8 L Security is an armoured version of the A8 L with VR9 ballistic protection standard in accordance with the BRV 2009 guideline, with VR10 in certain areas, and explosives resistance tested in accordance with the ERV 2010 guideline (Explosion Resistant Vehicles). The occupant cell is made of heat-formed armor steel, aramid fabric, ceramic, a special aluminum alloy, and multi-laminated glass, with protective materials which overlap at transitions. The aluminum side sills incorporate ballistic-proof profiles. The armor-plated vehicle floor is made from a special aluminum alloy for explosive weapons resistance. Door windows, windshield and rear window incorporate special glass with a splinter-inhibiting polycarbonate layer on the inside, with doorstop function and optional electromechanical side windows. Other optional security equipment include emergency exit system with pyrotechnic fracture bolts in the hinges to detach the door from the body, fire extinguisher system with two tanks and nozzles that spray to wheel arches, onto the underbody, the tank, and into the engine compartment; emergency fresh-air system with two pressurized cartridges housed in the protected zone, security start with remote radio signal engine start, selective unlocking of doors, a smoke extractor for the interior, an LED signal system for convoy driving, pennant holder, flashing lights, a siren, a preparation for or installation of analog and digital radio networks for security authorities and organizations, a built-in phone, an accident data recorder, an additional rear camera, a heated windshield including partly heated side windows. Other features included LED (V8 4.0 TFSI) or Matrix LED (W12 FSI) headlights, quattro permanent all-wheel drive, armor-plated (ceramic doors, aluminum frame) communications box in the trunk with a supplementary battery, optional battery and fuel tank protection, intercom system with a loudspeaker in the Singleframe grille and microphones for the interior and the vehicle's surroundings, two electrically adjustable individual seats in the rear, front comfort seats with optional with massage and ventilation functions (optional front-passenger relaxation seat with electric-control footrest, ventilation and massage function), an optional continuous center console with large storage compartments is also available, rear seat entertainment with two 10.2-inch displays, optional folding table, a cool box and auxiliary heating; new Unicum leather interior upholstery, forged 19-inch wheels, 255/70 tires with high load index 117, polymer rings on the rims, direct-measurement tire pressure monitoring system, optional spare wheel, 4-zone automatic air conditioning with an ionizer, electric rear blinds, Bose surround sound system, a TV tuner, and parking system plus with surround view camera.

Deliveries began in the third quarter of 2014.

==== S8 plus (2015) ====
Based on the short wheelbase S8, the S8 plus includes increased engine power to 605 PS (445 kW; 597 bhp) and 700 N⋅m (516.3 lb⋅ft) of torque, with overboost to 750 N⋅m (553.2 lb⋅ft) of torque, as well as unique 21-inch wheels with 275/35R21 tires in Germany.

The vehicle was unveiled at the 2015 Los Angeles Auto Show. The German model went on sale in end of November 2015 for a base price of 145,200 euros. The US model went on sale in December 2015 as 2016 model year vehicle for US$114,900.

==== Engines ====
Petrol engines
Model	Years	Type	Power, torque at rpm
A8 (L) 2.0 TFSI hybrid	2013–2017	1,984 cc (121.1 cu in) I4 turbo	211 PS (155 kW; 208 bhp) at 4,300–6,000, 350 N⋅m (258.15 lbf⋅ft) at 1,500–4,200
A8 (L) 2.0 TFSI hybrid	2013–2017	electric motor, 1.3 kWh lithium-ion battery	54 PS (40 kW; 53 bhp) at TBC, 210 N⋅m (154.89 lbf⋅ft) at TBC
A8 (L) 2.0 TFSI hybrid	2013–2017	combined	245 PS (180 kW; 242 bhp) at TBC, 480 N⋅m (354.03 lbf⋅ft) at TBC
A8 (L) 3.0 TFSI quattro (310PS)	2013–2017	2,995 cc (182.8 cu in) V6 supercharged	310 PS (228 kW; 306 bhp) at 5,200–6,500, 440 N⋅m (325 lb⋅ft) at 2,900–4,750
A8 (L) 4.0 TFSI quattro	2013–	3,993 cc (243.7 cu in) V8 twin turbo (VW EA825)	435 PS (320 kW; 429 bhp) at 5,100–6,000, 600 N⋅m (443 lb⋅ft) at 1,500–5,000
A8 L W12 6.3 FSI quattro	2013–2017	6,299 cc (384.4 cu in) W12	500 PS (368 kW; 493 bhp) at 6,200, 625 N⋅m (461 lb⋅ft) at 4,750
A8 L Security 4.0 TFSI quattro	2014–2017	3,993 cc (243.7 cu in) V8 twin turbo (VW EA825)	435 PS (320 kW; 429 bhp) at 5,100–6,000, 600 N⋅m (443 lb⋅ft) at 1,500–5,000
A8 L Security W12 6.3 FSI quattro	2014–2017	6,299 cc (384.4 cu in) W12	500 PS (368 kW; 493 bhp) at 6,200, 625 N⋅m (461 lb⋅ft) at 4,750
S8 4.0 TFSI quattro	2015–2017	3,993 cc (243.7 cu in) V8 twin turbo (VW EA 825)	520 PS (382 kW; 513 bhp) at 5,800, 650 N⋅m (479.42 lb⋅ft) at 1,700–5,500
S8 plus 4.0 TFSI quattro	2015–2017	3,992 cc (243.6 cu in) V8 twin turbo (VW EA 825)	605 PS (445 kW; 597 bhp) at 6,100–6,800, 700 N⋅m (516.3 lb⋅ft) at 1,700–6,000; Overboost: 750 N⋅m (553.2 lb⋅ft)

Diesel engines
Model	Years	Type	Power, torque at rpm
A8 (L) 3.0 TDI clean diesel quattro (258PS)	2013–2017	2,967 cc (181.1 cu in) V6 turbo	258 PS (190 kW; 254 bhp) at 4,000–4250, 580 N⋅m (428 lb⋅ft) at 1,750–2,500
A8 (L) 4.2 TDI clean diesel quattro (385PS)	2013–2017	4,134 cc (252.3 cu in) V8 twin-turbo	385 PS (283 kW; 380 bhp) at 3,750, 850 N⋅m (627 lb⋅ft) at 2,000–2,750

==== Transmission ====
All models include an eight-speed Tiptronic transmission.

==== Production ====
The A8's aluminium chassis was built at the Neckarsulm plant.

==== Marketing ====
As an April Fools' Day joke on 1 April 2015, Audi Japan announced a special edition A8 5.5 with a rice cooker on the rear center console. The 5.5 designation is a play on the Japanese words "go" (five) and "han" (half); when combined, they become "gohan" (悟飯), which is the Japanese word for "rice". Audi S8 was used in The Transporter Refueled. Audi S8 was used in Avengers: Age of Ultron, alongside Spider-Man: Homecoming. A blockbuster style commercial film Suspect was published for the Audi S8 in 2012, which features an unnamed male model as driver.

== D5 (Typ 4N, 2017) ==
Fourth generation (D5/4N)
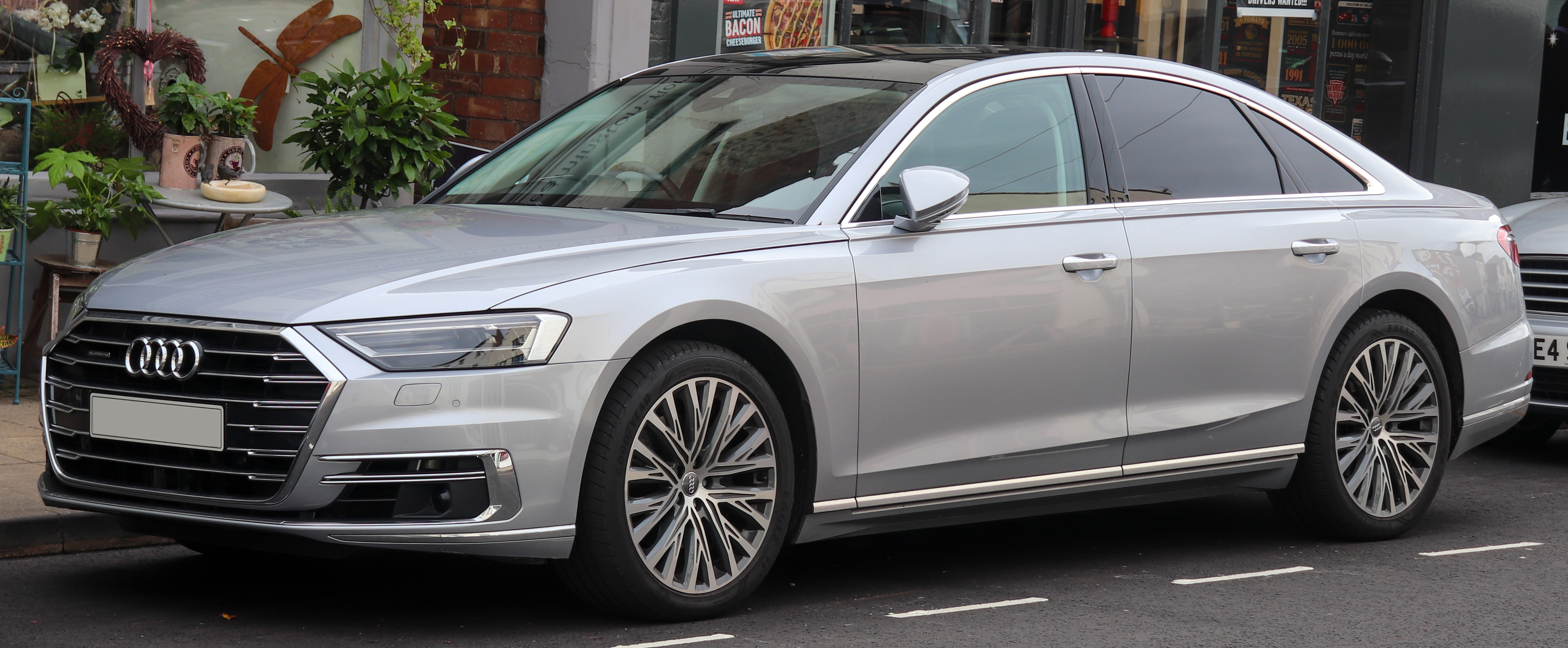

Overview
- Production: November 2017–October 2026
- Model years: 2018–2027
- Assembly: Germany: Neckarsulm
- Designer: Sascha Heyde, Amar Vaya

Body and chassis
- Platform: MLB Evo
- Related: Volkswagen Touareg; Audi Q8; Audi Q7; Audi A6; Audi A7; Porsche Cayenne; Lamborghini Urus

Powertrain
- Engine: Petrol engines: 3.0 L biturbo FSI V6; 3.0 L biturbo FSI V6 MHEV; 3.0 L biturbo FSI V6 PHEV; 4.0 L biturbo FSI V8 MHEV; Diesel engines: 3.0 L biturbo V6; 4.0 L biturbo V8
- Electric motor: 48-volt system Belt alternator starter (BAS): MHEV; 108 hp (81 kW; 109 PS) AC induction motor: PHEV
- Transmission: 8-speed Tiptronic automatic 8-speed Plug-In Hybrid ZF 8HP90 Tiptronic automatic
- Hybrid drivetrain: MHEV (60 TFSI / S8 TFSI); PHEV (60 TFSI e)
- Battery: 14.1 kWh lithium-ion (PHEV)
- Electric range: 17 mi (27 km) (60 TFSI e)

Dimensions
- Wheelbase: 2,998 mm (118.0 in); 3,128 mm (123.1 in) (LWB); 3,258 mm (128.3 in) (Horch)
- Length: 5,172 mm (203.6 in); 5,302 mm (208.7 in) (LWB); 5,422 mm (213.5 in) (Horch)
- Width: 1,945 mm (76.6 in)
- Height: 1,485 mm (58.5 in)

=== A8 and A8 L ===
The design of the A8 and A8 L was based on the Audi Prologue concept. The new generation, code-named D5, was unveiled at the Audi Summit in Barcelona on 11 July 2017 and presented at the 2017 Frankfurt Motor Show. The standard wheelbase A8 went on sale in November 2017, and the long wheelbase A8 L was launched in 2018.

Traffic Jam Pilot is a new feature, consisting of Level 3 autonomous driving, that allows the car to travel in the heavy traffic on the highway up to 60 km/h (37 mph) without any assistance from the driver. Due to the complicated legal regulations, Audi cancelled the launch of this feature for the United States market in 2019.

As part of the deal between Marvel Studios and Audi, the fourth generation of A8 first premiered in the "Driver's Test" commercial that premiered on 19 June 2017, as a tie-in to Spider-Man: Homecoming movie. In the commercial, Peter Parker (Tom Holland) takes the car, a prototype belonging to Tony Stark, for a test-drive alongside his driving instructor played by J. B. Smoove. The car also had a small product placement appearance in the actual movie itself.

=== S8 (2020) ===
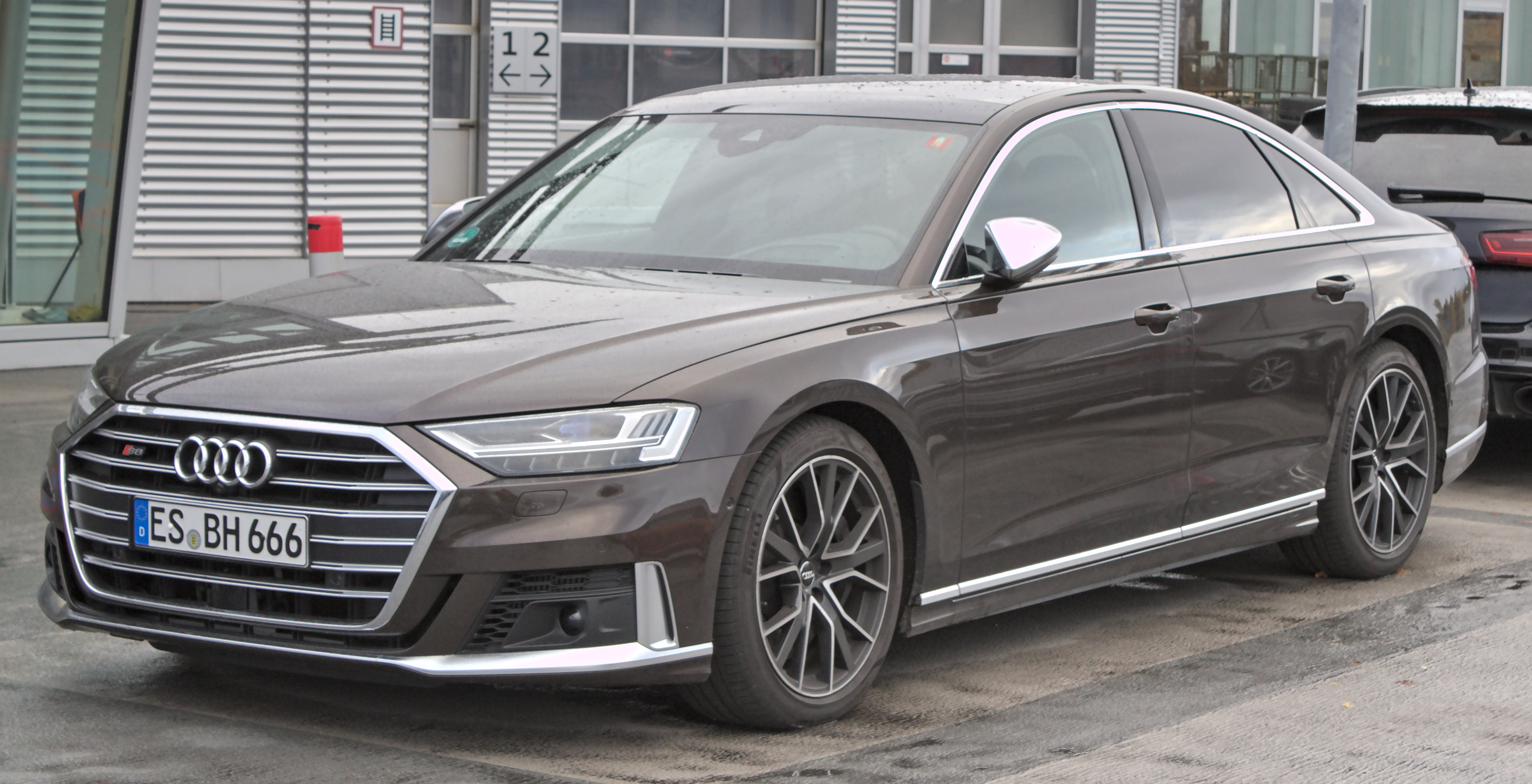
Audi S8

The higher performance version, S8, was introduced in the late 2019 for the 2020 model year. Unlike previous generation S8s which were only built upon the short-wheelbase A8 variant, the D5 generation is available in both short-wheelbase and long-wheelbase, with North America having only the long-wheelbase S8 (i.e. S8 L). The S8 has a higher output version of the petrol V8 fitted to the A8 and A8L 60 TFSI quattro.

=== 2022 model year facelift ===
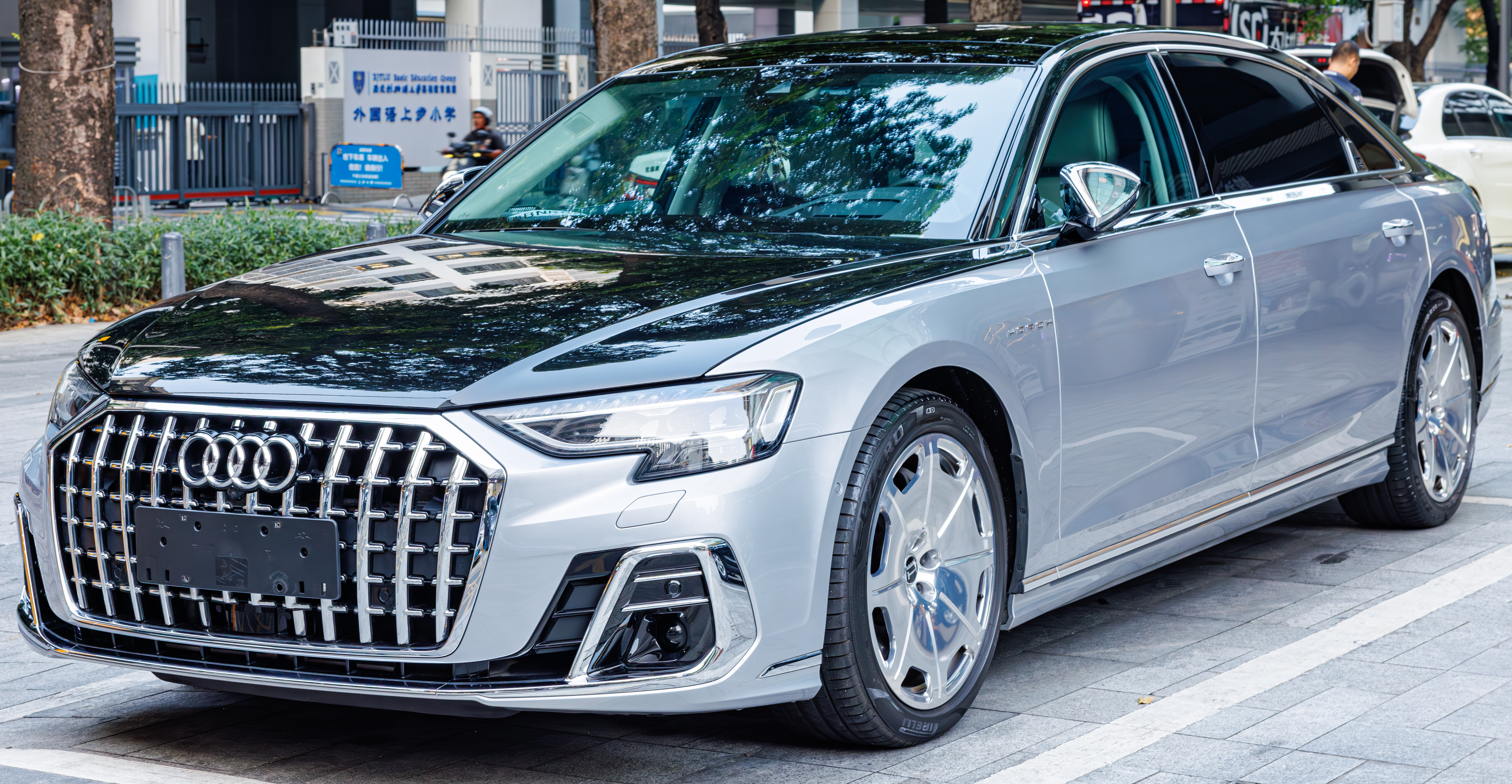
Audi A8 L Horch (China)

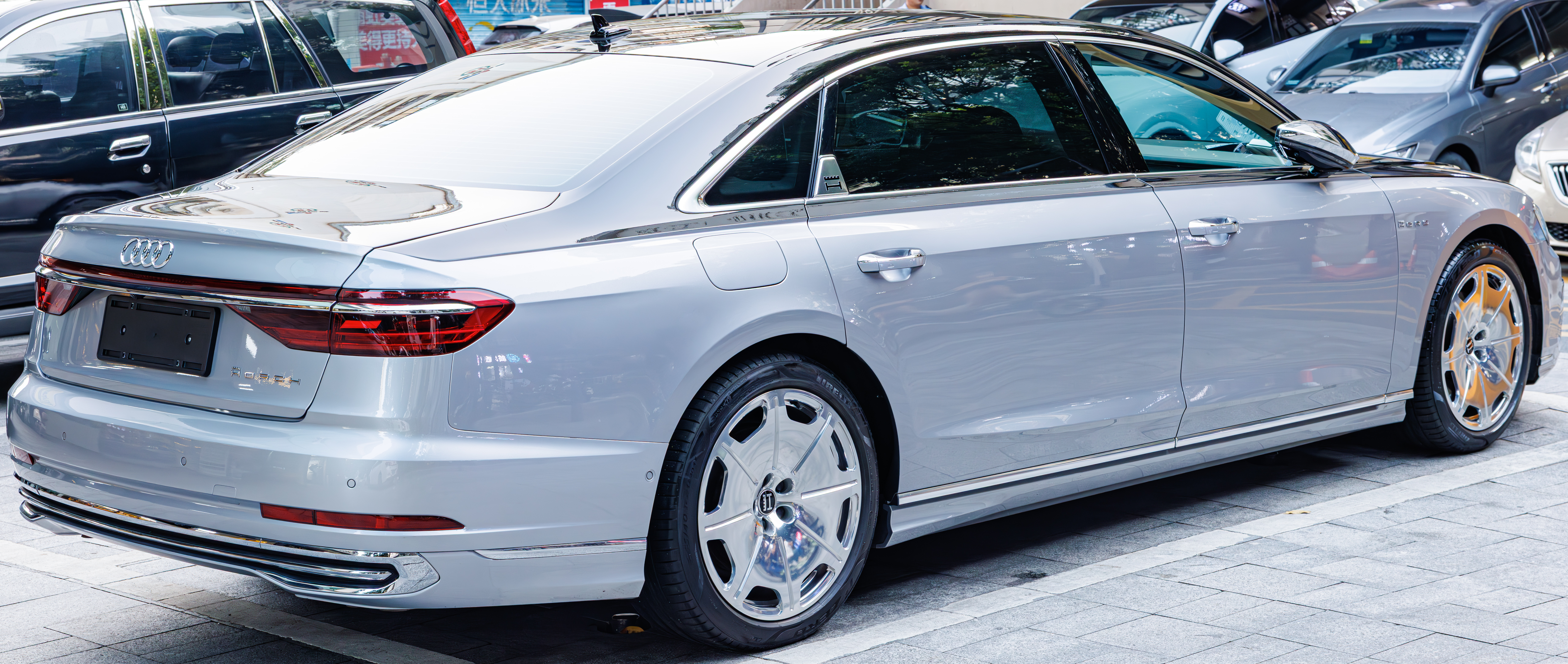
Audi A8 L Horch rear (China)

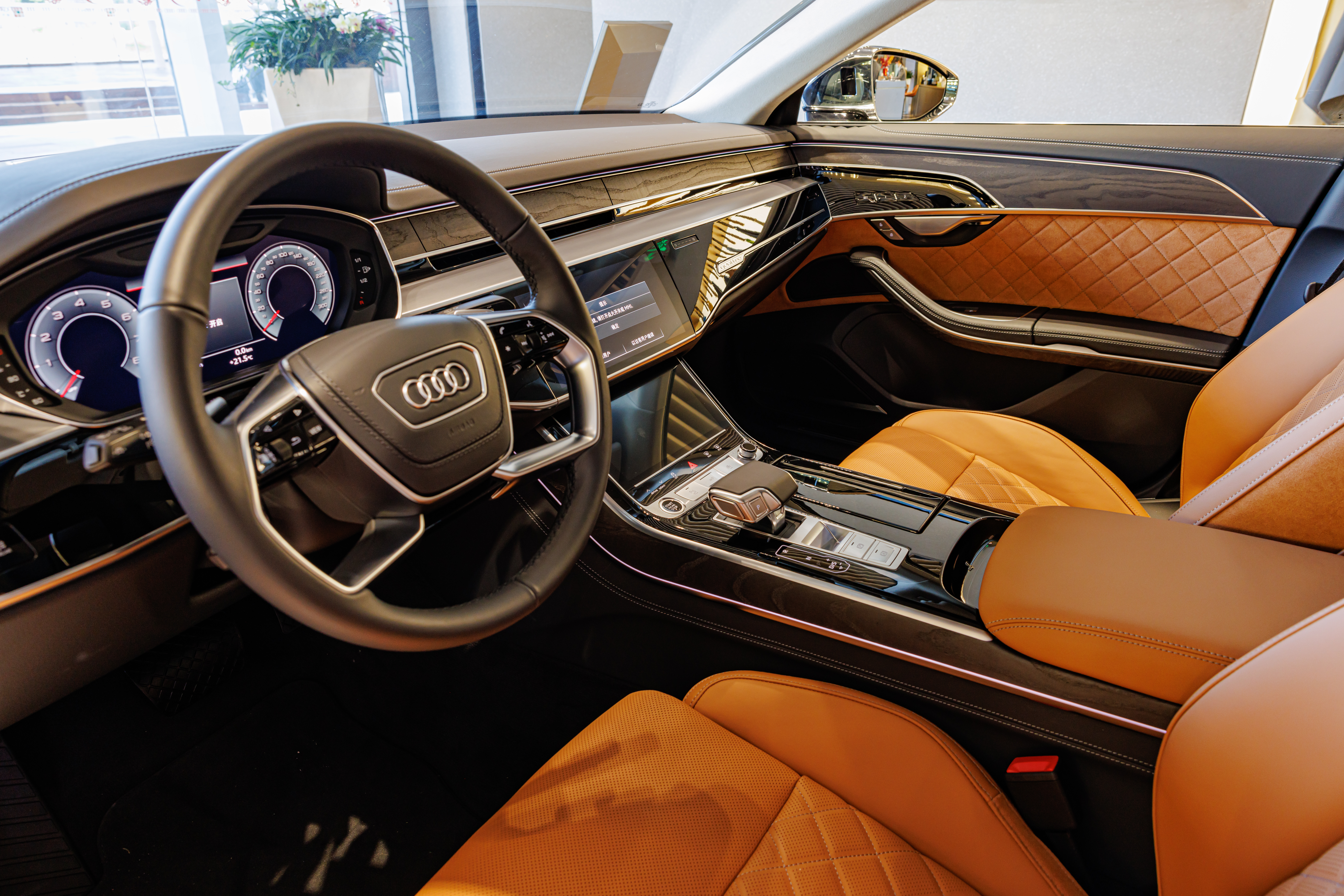
Audi A8 Horch Interior

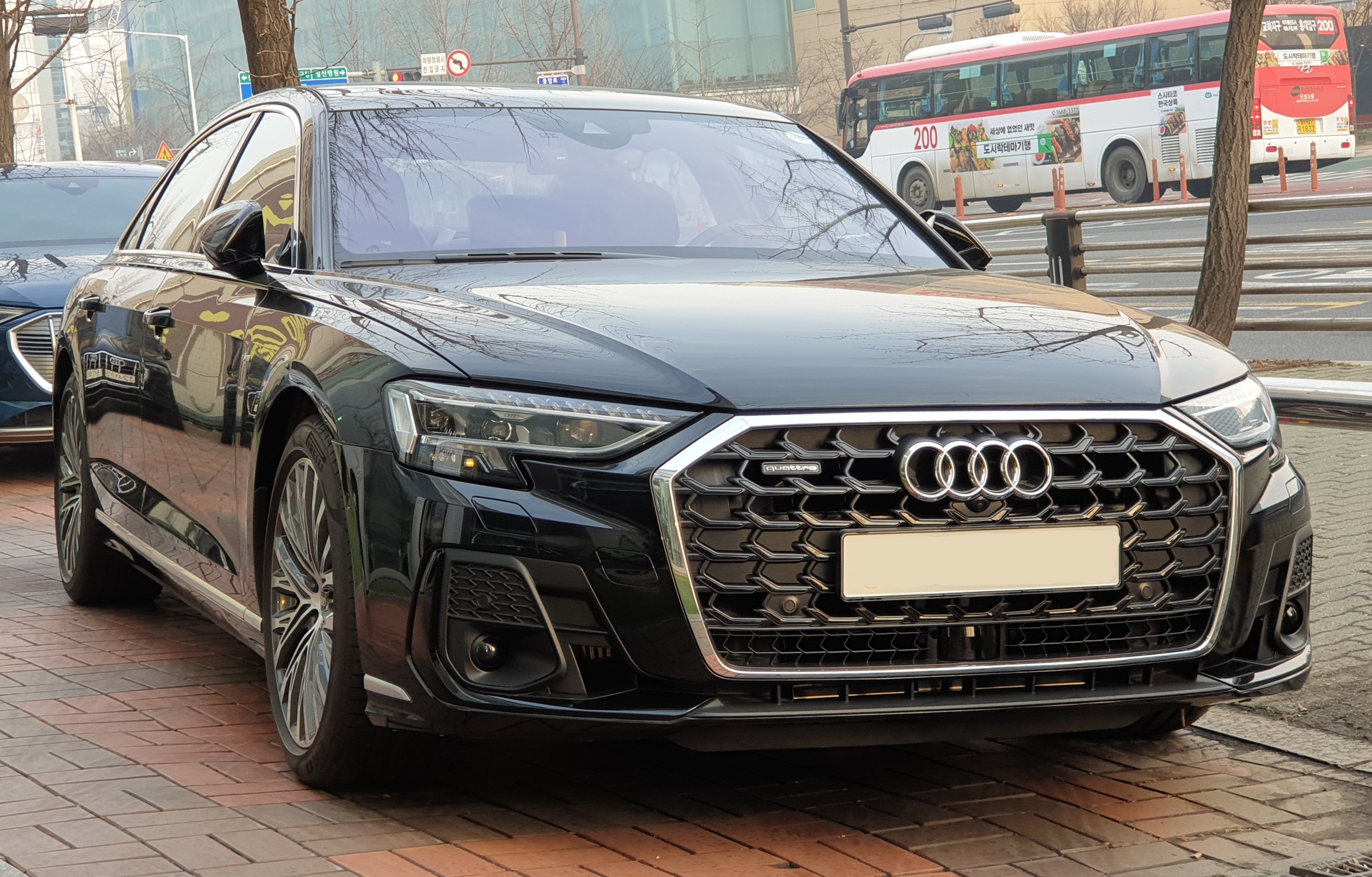
MY22 facelift Audi A8 (Korea)

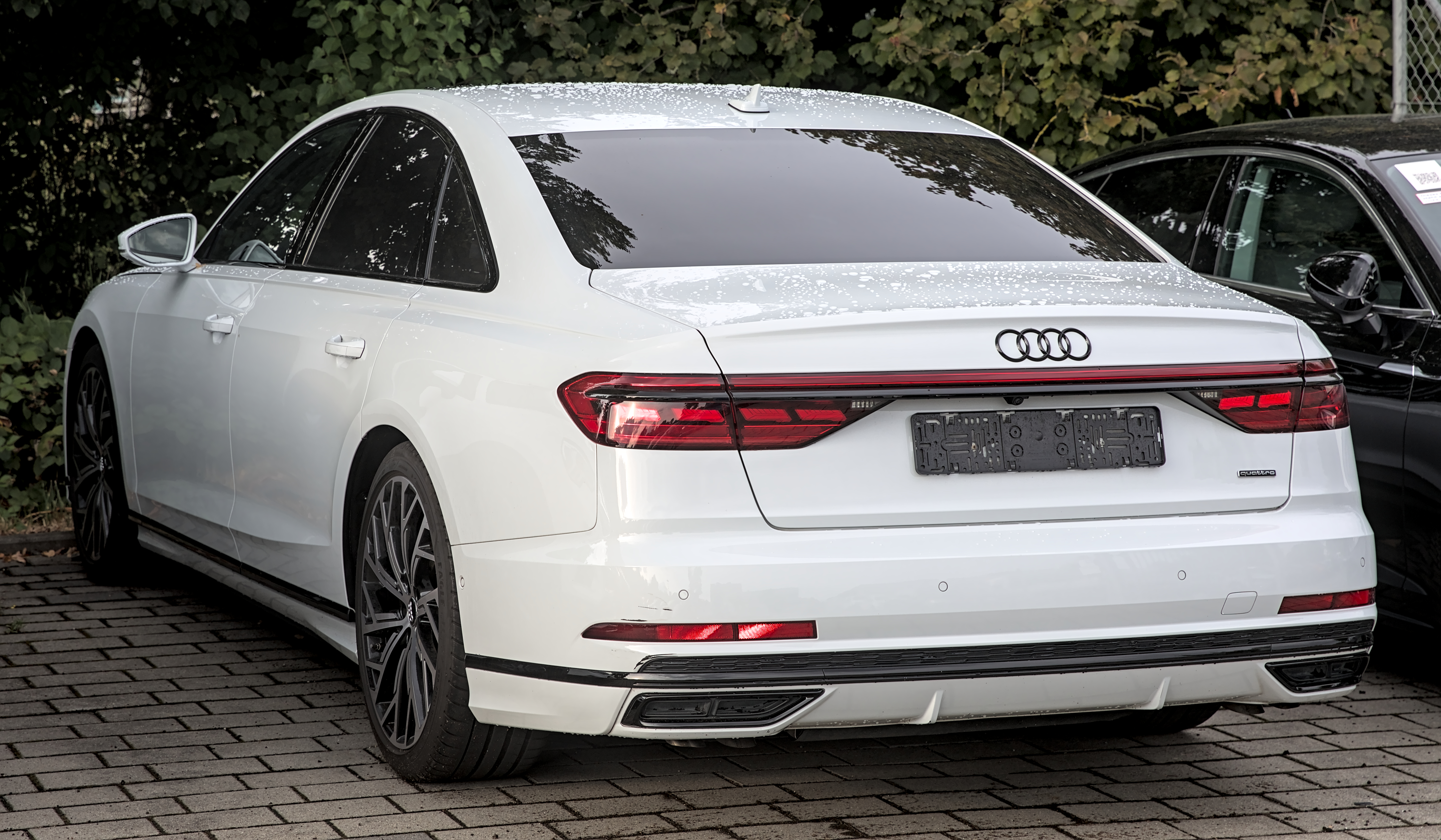
MY22 facelift Audi A8 (Europe)

On 29 October 2021, Audi revealed the facelifted A8 ahead of its Chinese introduction at the Guangzhou Auto Show and later next year in Europe. The facelift also included the revival of the Horch (A8L Horch Founder Edition) brand to compete against other ultra-luxury sedans in China with European sales a future possibility. A facelift Horch was presented in February 2024.

Production of the A8 ended in October 2026, with no immediate successor in the segment. 2027 is the final model year in the US.

=== Engines and transmission ===
At launch, the A8 had two engine options: one 3-litre petrol V6 (55 TFSI quattro) and 3-litre diesel V6 (50 TDI quattro). For 2019, the engine range was expanded to include the petrol and diesel V8 engines (60 TFSI quattro in 2020 and 60 TDI quattro in 2019, respectively). The plug-in hybrid version (PHEV) with a 3-litre petrol V6 and electric motor (60 TFSI e quattro) was launched in 2019. No hybrid system is fitted to the diesel engines. The petrol V8 engines fitted to the 60 TFSI quattro and S8 TFSI quattro have 48-volt MHEV systems that use the electric motor as a starter and for power assistance. No W12 engine was offered in the D5 model lineup.

All A8, A8 L, and the S8 feature the quattro all-wheel-drive system and an 8-speed Tiptronic automatic transmission.

Model	Years	Configuration	Displacement	Power	Torque	0–100 km/h (0–62 mph)	Top Speed	Fuel Consumption/Efficiency (EU-Norm combined)
Petrol Engines
55 TFSI	09/2017–05/2018	V6 biturbo (VW EA839 CZSE)	2,995 cc (182.8 cu in)	250 kW (340 PS; 335 bhp) at 5,000–6,400	500 N⋅m (369 lb⋅ft) at 1,370–4,500	5.6–5.7 seconds	250 km/h (155 mph)	7.5–7.8 L/100 km (31–30 mpg_{‑US})
55 TFSI	08/2019–2026	V6 biturbo (VW EA839) + 48-volt MHEV system	2,995 cc (182.8 cu in)	250 kW (340 PS; 335 bhp) at 5,000–6,400	500 N⋅m (369 lb⋅ft) at 1,370–4,500	5.6–5.7 seconds	250 km/h (155 mph)	9.4–10.2 L/100 km (25–23 mpg_{‑US})
60 TFSI	02/2020–2026	V8 biturbo (VW EA825) + 48-volt MHEV system	3,996 cc (243.9 cu in)	338 kW (460 PS; 453 bhp) at 5,500	600 N⋅m (443 lb⋅ft) at 1,850–4,500	4.4 seconds	250 km/h (155 mph)	11.1 L/100 km (21.2 mpg_{‑US})
S8 TFSI	11/2019–2026	V8 biturbo (VW EA825) + 48-volt MHEV system	3,996 cc (243.9 cu in)	420 kW (571 PS; 563 bhp) at 6,000	800 N⋅m (590 lb⋅ft) at 2,000–4,500	3.8 seconds	250 km/h (155 mph)	11.3 L/100 km (20.8 mpg_{‑US})
Diesel Engines
50 TDI	09/2017–08/2018	V6 biturbo (VW EA897evo2 DDVC)	2,967 cc (181.1 cu in)	210 kW (286 PS; 282 bhp) at 3,750–4,000	600 N⋅m (443 lb⋅ft) at 1,250–3,250	5.9 seconds	250 km/h (155 mph)	5.6–5.8 L/100 km (42–41 mpg_{‑US})
50 TDI	09/2018–2026	V6 biturbo (VW EA897evo2)	2,967 cc (181.1 cu in)	210 kW (286 PS; 282 bhp) at 3,500–4,000	600 N⋅m (443 lb⋅ft) at 1,250–3,250	5.9 seconds	250 km/h (155 mph)	5.6–5.9 L/100 km (42–40 mpg_{‑US})
60 TDI	12/2019–2026	V8 biturbo (VW EA898)	3,956 cc (241.4 cu in)	320 kW (435 PS; 429 bhp) at 3,750–4,750	900 N⋅m (664 lb⋅ft) at 1,250–3,250	4.4 seconds	250 km/h (155 mph)	7.2 L/100 km (33 mpg_{‑US})
Plug-In Hybrid Petrol Engines
60 TFSI e	10/2019–2026	V6 biturbo (VW EA839) + Electric Motor	2,995 cc (182.8 cu in)	250 kW (340 PS; 335 bhp) at 4,200 (Engine) / 100 kW (140 PS; 130 bhp) (Electric)	500 N⋅m (369 lb⋅ft) at 1,600–1,800 (Engine) / 350 N⋅m (258 lb⋅ft) (Electric)	4.9 seconds	250 km/h (155 mph)	2.5–2.7 L/100 km (94–87 mpg_{‑US})

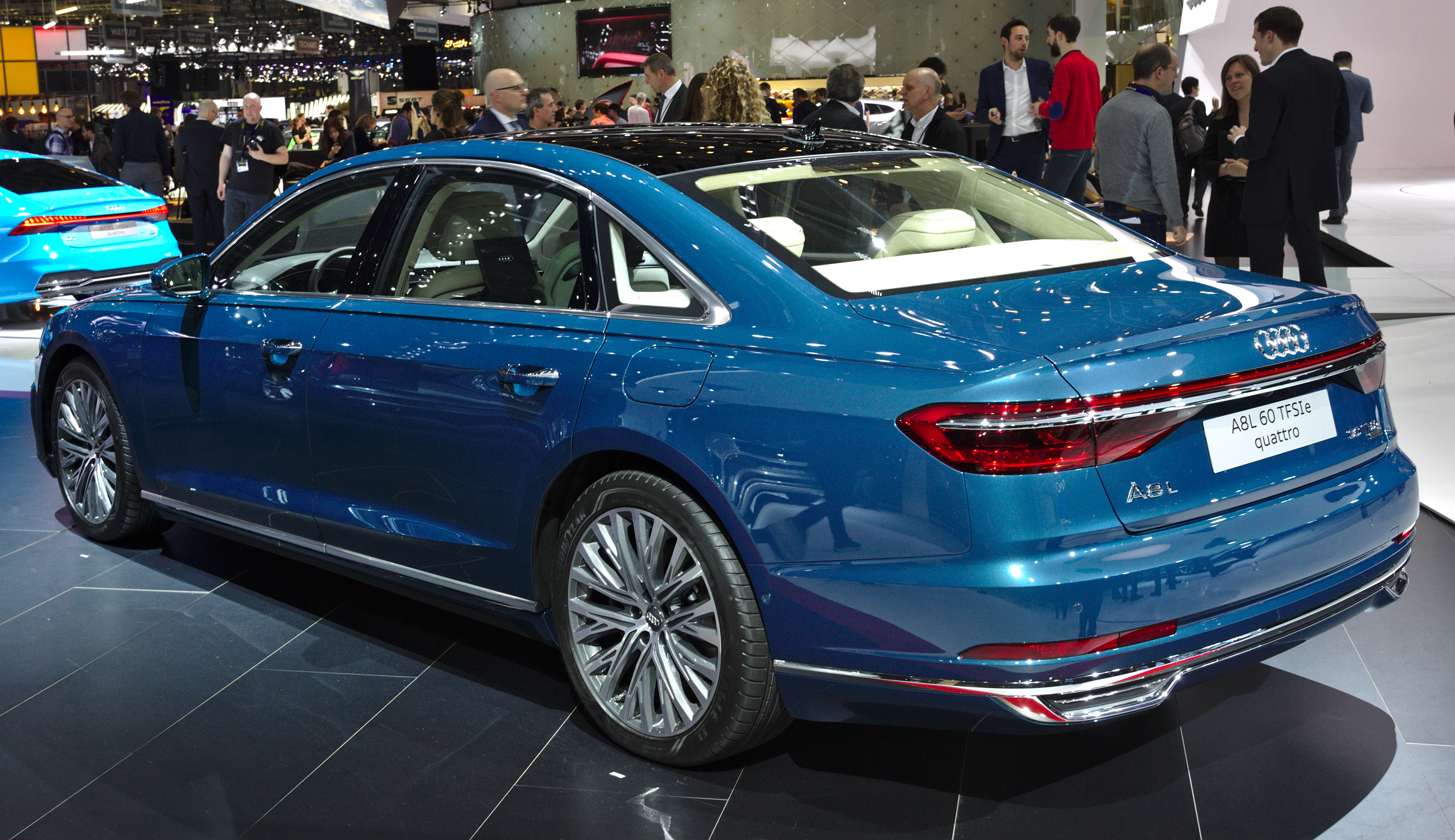
Audi A8L 60 TFSIe Quattro

== Production and sales ==
Production
Year	Units
1994	5,016
1995	12,705
1996	11,098
1997	15,507
1998	15,355
1999	14,636
2000	12,894
2001	11,708
2002	10,942
2003	21,748
2004	22,429
2005	21,509
2006	22,468
2007	22,182
2008	20,140
2009	8,599
2010	22,435
2011	38,542
2012	35,932
2013	39,757
2014	39,606
2015	27,077
2016	24,147
2017	15,854
2018	24,541
2019	23,826
2020	20,591
2021	23,308
2022	17,992
2023	20,293
2024	14,955

Sales
Year	China	US
2023	11,397	2,259
2024	9,229	1,628
2025	6,193	1,406
