= Audi Q5 =

Compact luxury crossover SUV

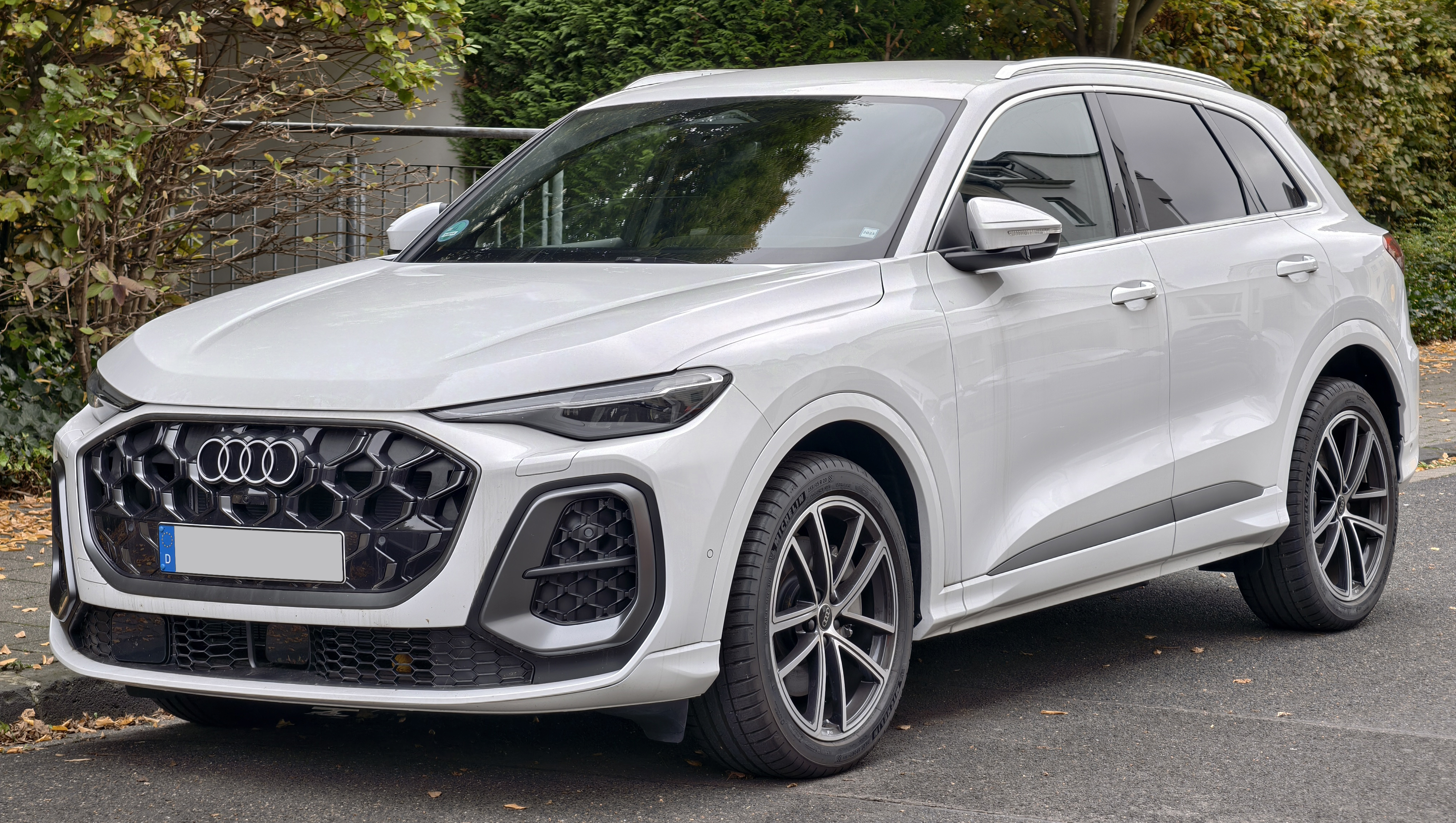

Overview
- Manufacturer: Audi
- Production: 2008–present

Body and chassis
- Class: Compact luxury crossover SUV
- Body style: 5-door SUV; 5-door coupé SUV (Sportback) (2020–present)
- Layout: Front-engine, front-wheel drive; Front-engine, four-wheel-drive (quattro)

The Audi Q5 is a series of compact luxury crossover SUVs produced by the German luxury car manufacturer Audi from 2008. The original first-generation (Typ 8R) model was the third member of the B8 family to be released after the Audi A5 and fourth-generation A4, all being based on the Audi MLB platform. The second generation Q5 (Typ 80A) debuted in 2018 and shares the Audi MLB Evo platform with the corresponding B9 versions of the A4 and A5.

== First generation (Typ 8R; 2008) ==
First generation
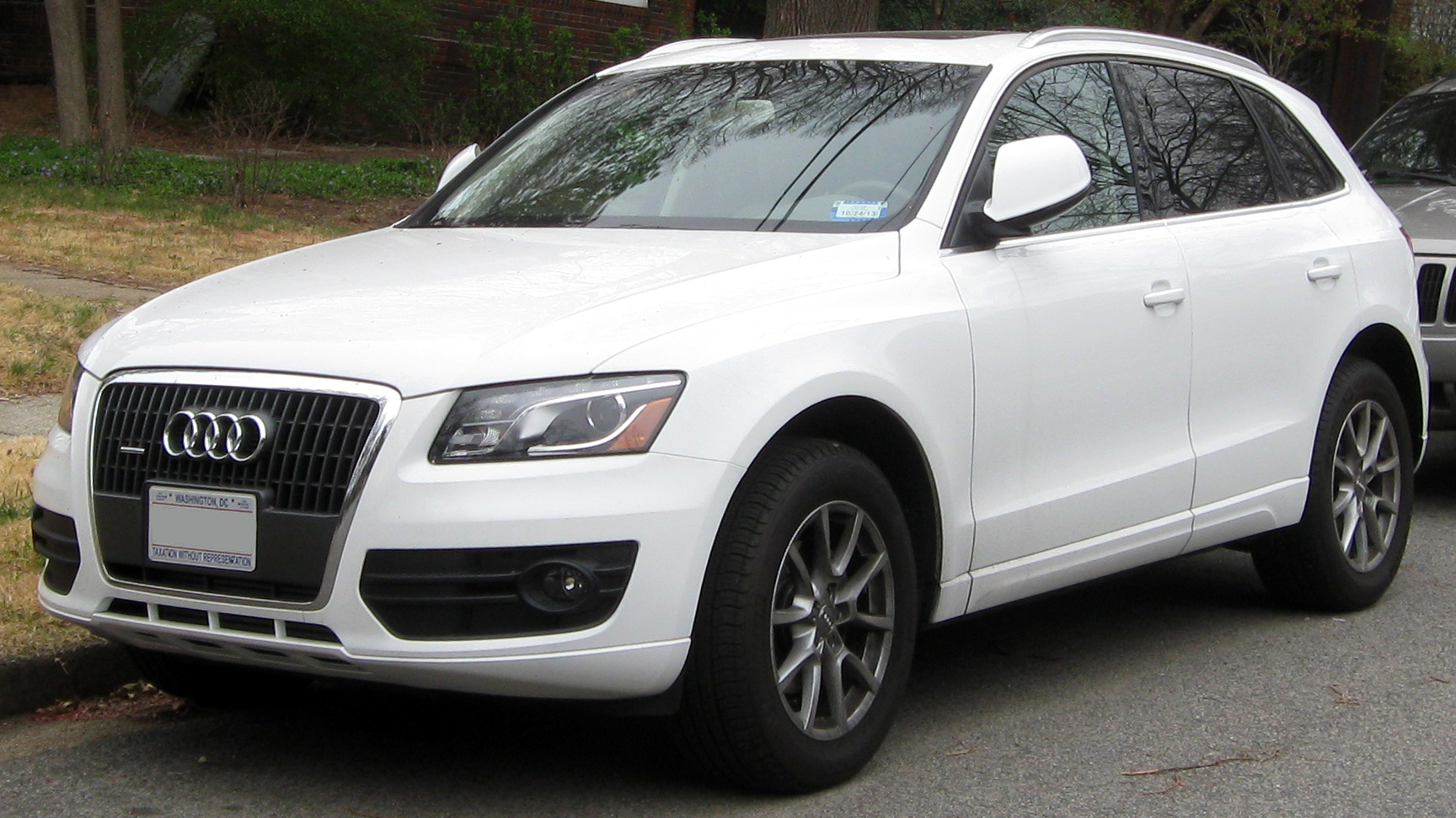

Overview
- Model code: 8R
- Production: July 2008–2017
- Assembly: Germany: Ingolstadt; Russia: Kaluga (Volkswagen Group Russia); China: Changchun (FAW-Volkswagen); India: Aurangabad, Maharashtra (Audi India: CKD); Malaysia: Shah Alam (Euromobil)
- Designer: Christian Winkelmann (2005)

Body and chassis
- Body style: 5-door SUV
- Platform: MLB
- Related: Porsche Macan

Powertrain
- Engine: petrol: 2.0 L TFSI I4; 3.2 L V6 FSI; diesel: 2.0 L TDI I4; 3.0 L TDI diesel V6
- Transmission: 6-speed manual; 6-speed ZF 6HP Tiptronic; 8-speed ZF 8HP Tiptronic; 7-speed S Tronic

Dimensions
- Wheelbase: 2,807 mm (110.5 in)
- Length: 4,639 mm (182.6 in)
- Width: 1,880 mm (74.0 in)
- Height: 1,650 mm (65.0 in)
- Kerb weight: 1,850 kg (4,080 lb)

=== Audi Cross Cabriolet quattro concept (2007) ===
A concept vehicle for the then upcoming Q5, this was a 2-door convertible with a 3.0 TDI engine rated at 240 PS (177 kW; 237 hp) and 500 N⋅m (369 lbf⋅ft) torque, quattro permanent four wheel drive, 8-speed automatic transmission, Copper Sunset body, LED headlights, 21-inch wheels with 265/35R21 tyres, seats with White Stone leather upholstery, MMI, 505W Bang & Olufsen sound system and internet radio, CDC (continuous damping control) shock absorbers, electric ride height adjustment (40 mm), 380/356 mm front/rear ceramic brake discs with 6-piston monobloc aluminium front, and floating rear callipers, Audi Drive Select. The vehicle was unveiled at the 2007 Los Angeles Auto Show.

=== Initial version ===
==== Q5 (2008) ====
The vehicle was unveiled at the 2008 Beijing Auto Show, and later at the 2008 Los Angeles Auto Show.

Early models include the 2.0 TFSI quattro (211PS), 2.0 TDI quattro (170PS), 3.0 TDI quattro.

Initial vehicle models for US, Canada & Brazil include the 3.2 FSI.

The Q5 commenced shipments in October 2008 for Europe, and in the first quarter of 2009 for North America.

The US model went on sale in March 2009 as a 2009 model year vehicle. Early models include 3.2 FSI quattro and the 2.0 TFSI quattro (211PS) was added in 2011 model year.

Indian models went on sale in June 2009, and were initially built by Audi's Ingolstadt facility, but are built at its Aurangabad, Maharashtra, India plant. Launch models include 3.0 TDI, 2.0 TFSI (211 PS).

Middle East models went on sale in 2009 Q2. Launch models include 2.0 TFSI (211 PS), 3.2 FSI.

Japanese models include 2.0 TFSI quattro (211 PS), 3.2 FSI quattro.

==== Audi Q5 custom concept (2009) ====
It is a concept vehicle that includes an enhanced engine, 7-speed S tronic transmission, Quattro all wheel drive. The 3.0 TFSI V6 engine was rated 408 PS (300 kW; 402 hp) at 6,000–7,000 rpm and 500 N⋅m (369 lb⋅ft) at 3,000–5,500 rpm. Other features include ceramic brakes, active sound exhaust system, 90 millimetre wider track, 60 millimetre lower ride height, 21-inch Daytona Gray colour wheels of 7 twin-spoke design, modified air intake, cooling water strut brace in engine compartment, stainless steel-plated pedals, S line sport seats, panorama roof system, "Wörthersee 09" adhesive film, textile floor mats with "Wörthersee 09" print application, Audi drive select vehicle dynamics system, parking aid with rearview camera, voice control, Audi lane assist (lane departure warning), headlight range control with cornering lights.

The vehicle was unveiled at the Wörthersee Tour 2009.

==== Audi Q5 FCEV (2009) ====
The Audi Q5 FCEV (2009) is a fuel cell based concept car that was demonstrated on 19 October 2009 at CEP Berlin. It sports an 85 kW PEMFC, a 22 kW lithium-ion battery and a 230 Nm asynchronous motor.

==== Audi Q5 hybrid ====
Audi has originally reported that it would offer the Q5 hybrid as launch model, but it was later reported that Audi suspended the plan because of unsatisfactory crash test results for the nickel metal hydride batteries. In 2009, Audi announced it would resume the Q5 hybrid development. It included a 266V, 1.3kWh, battery pack. The Q5 has an all-electric range of about 3 km (2 mi) and maximum all-electric speed of 100 km/h (62 mph).

The production version would be on sale in 2012 for the Japanese market. The release in the U.S. market was scheduled for late 2011.

==== Engines ====
Petrol engines
Model	Year	Engine type	Power, torque at rpm
2.0 TFSI hybrid quattro	2011–	1,984 cc (1.984 L; 121.1 cu in) I4 turbo (petrol)	211 PS (155 kW; 208 hp) at 4,300–6,000, 350 N⋅m (258.15 lbf⋅ft) at 1,500–4,200
2.0 TFSI hybrid quattro	2011–	electric motor, 266V, 1.3kWh battery pack	54 PS (40 kW; 53 hp) at ?, 210 N⋅m (154.89 lbf⋅ft) at ?
2.0 TFSI hybrid quattro	2011–	combined	245 PS (180 kW; 242 hp) at ?, 480 N⋅m (354.03 lbf⋅ft) at ?
2.0 TFSI quattro (180PS)	2009–2012	1,984 cc (1.984 L; 121.1 cu in) I4 turbo	180 PS (132 kW; 178 hp) at 4,000–6,000, 320 N⋅m (236 lbf⋅ft) at 1,500–4,200
2.0 TFSI quattro (211PS)	2008–2012	1,984 cc (1.984 L; 121.1 cu in) I4 turbo	211 PS (155 kW; 208 hp) at 4,300–6,000, 350 N⋅m (258 lbf⋅ft) at 1,500–4,200
2.0 TFSI quattro (225PS)	2011–	1,984 cc (1.984 L; 121.1 cu in) I4 turbo	225 PS (165 kW; 222 hp) at 4,500–6,250, 350 N⋅m (258 lbf⋅ft) at 1,500–4,500
3.2 FSI quattro	2009–2012	3,197 cc (3.197 L; 195.1 cu in) V6	270 PS (199 kW; 266 hp) at 6,500, 330 N⋅m (243 lbf⋅ft) at 3,000–5,000
3.0 TFSI quattro	2013-	2,995 cc (2.995 L; 182.8 cu in) V6 supercharged	272 PS (200 kW; 268 hp) at 6,500, 400 N⋅m (295 lbf⋅ft) at 1,500-3,900
Diesel Engines
Model	Year	Engine type	Power, torque at rpm
2.0 TDI (143PS)	2009–	1,968 cc (1.968 L; 120.1 cu in) I4 turbo common rail	143 PS (105 kW; 141 hp) at 4,200, 320 N⋅m (236 lbf⋅ft) at 1,750–2,500
2.0 TDI quattro (143PS)	2009–2012	1,968 cc (1.968 L; 120.1 cu in) I4 turbo common rail	143 PS (105 kW; 141 hp) at 4,200, 320 N⋅m (236 lbf⋅ft) at 1,750–2,500
2.0 TDI quattro (170PS)	2008–2012	1,968 cc (1.968 L; 120.1 cu in) I4 turbo common rail	170 PS (125 kW; 168 hp) at 4,200, 350 N⋅m (258 lbf⋅ft) at 1,750–2,500
3.0 TDI quattro	2008–2012	2,967 cc (2.967 L; 181.1 cu in) V6 turbo common rail	240 PS (177 kW; 237 hp) at 4,000–4400, 500 N⋅m (369 lbf⋅ft) at 1,500–3,000

180 PS 2.0 TFSI and 143 PS 2.0 TDI engines were introduced in Europe beginning in 2009.

==== Transmissions ====
Petrol engines
Model	Year	Standard	Optional
2.0 TFSI hybrid quattro	2011–	8-speed Tiptronic	-
2.0 TFSI quattro (180PS)	2009–2012	6-speed manual	-
2.0 TFSI quattro (211PS)	2008–2012	6-speed manual	7-speed S tronic, 8-speed Tiptronic
2.0 TFSI quattro (225PS)	2011–	6-speed manual	8-speed Tiptronic
3.2 FSI quattro	2009–2012	6-speed Tiptronic, 7-speed S tronic	
3.0 TFSI quattro (272PS)	2013-	8-speed Tiptronic	
Diesel engines
Model	Year	Standard	Optional
2.0 TDI (143PS)	2009–	6-speed manual	-
2.0 TDI quattro (143PS)	2009–2012	6-speed manual	-
2.0 TDI quattro (170PS)	2008–2012	6-speed manual	7-speed S tronic
3.0 TDI quattro	2008–2012	7-speed S tronic	-

German models include standard 7-speed S tronic transmission for all V6 models. 8-speed Tiptronic is an option for Q5 2.0 TFSI quattro (211 PS).

US and Canadian Q5 3.2 FSI models include 6-speed Tiptronic as standard transmission. US and Canadian Q5 2.0 TFSI models include 8-speed Tiptronic as standard transmission.

Japanese models include standard 7-speed S tronic transmission for all models.

==== Equipment ====
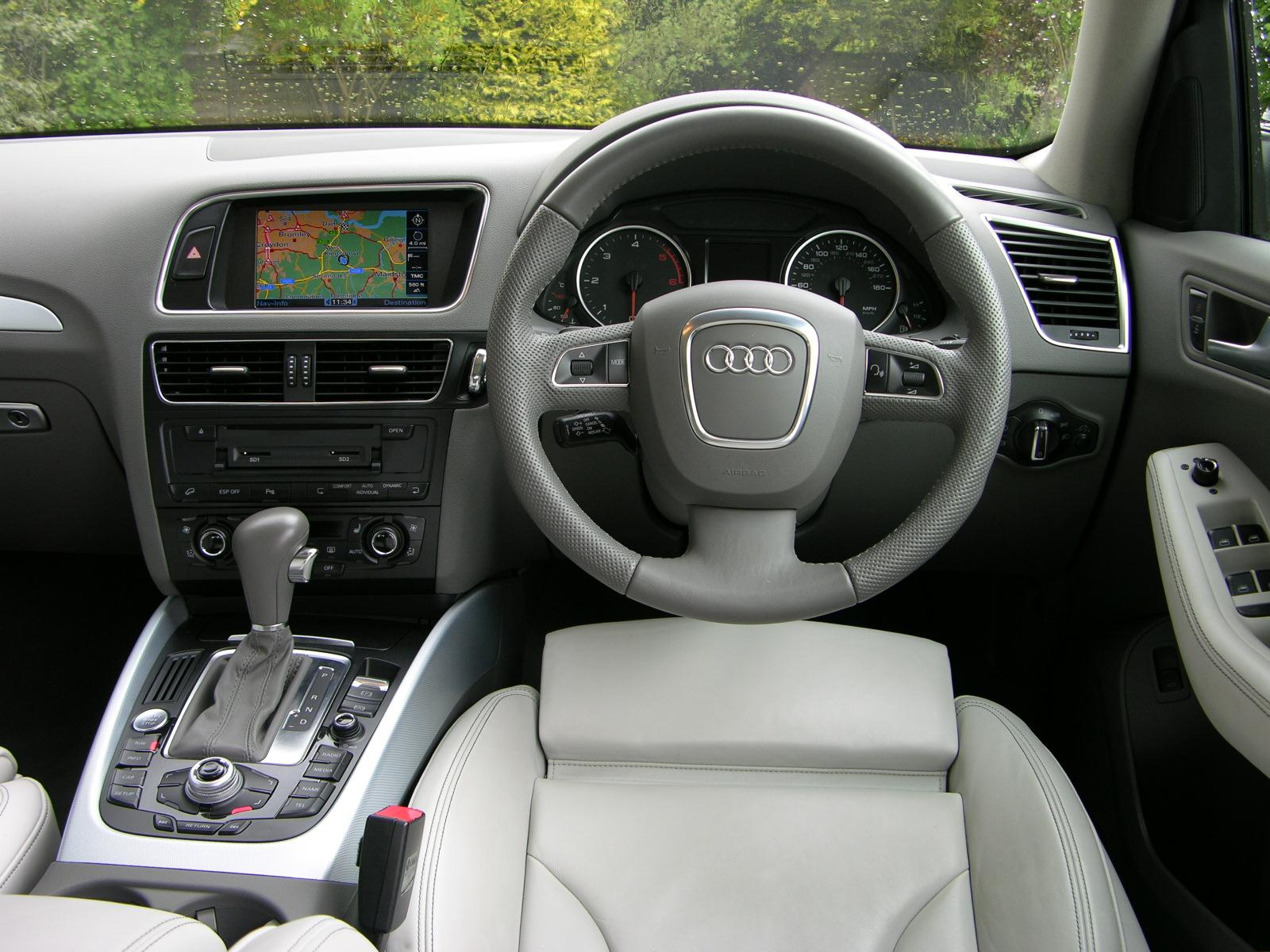
Interior

Harman/Becker Automotive Systems produced Audi's new updated Multi Media Interface (MMI) technology for Q5. The new system includes navigation, communication, and wide-screen entertainment. A three-dimensional orientation view with true-to-scale terrain and photo realistic depictions of key landmarks will also be generated. Included features in this new system are USB storage media (iPod or MP3), satellite radio, and an integral four-band GSM mobile/cell phone (SIM card ready) with Bluetooth connectivity.

S line package includes 20-inch S line wheels, headlight washers, sport steering wheels with shift paddles, brushed aluminium inlays, S line aluminium door sills, and a black headliner. The Offroad exterior package includes front and rear underbody protection panels, along with flared fender and door sill protection.

==== Carrying and towing capabilities ====
A sensor informs the ESP system if a roof rack has been mounted, which will cause the Audi Q5's centre of gravity to be shifted higher in keeping with the roof load of up to 100 kg (220 lb). If a roof rack is present, the ESP engages earlier in the handling limit. Without a roof load, the driver is free to tap the full dynamic potential of the Audi Q5.

The Audi Q5 is capable of towing up to 2.0 tonnes; the standard hill descent control system makes it safe to navigate down steep inclines by regulating the preselected speed when driving at under 30 km/h (19 mph). The Q5 is also fitted with an advanced Trailer Stability Program designed to combat any unwanted snaking when towing a large trailer or caravan.

==== Production ====
The new vehicle was expected to be built in Audi's home town of Ingolstadt. An investment of €300 million in production tooling and expansion was expected.

In September 2016, Audi has opened a factory with a capacity of 150,000 Q5 in San José Chiapa (Mexico).

=== 2012 facelift ===
Main changes include a redesigned set of front and rear light configuration, and a new set of engines that increase both output and efficiency. Most interior user controls have narrow chrome trim. Ergonomics changes include 4-button MMI navigation plus system, additional skip function for volume dial. Large fabric-upholstered surfaces are standard on the door trim panels; inlay options include three wood veneers and one aluminium version.

The vehicles went on sale in summer 2012. Early models include 2.0 TFSI hybrid quattro, 2.0 TFSI quattro (225PS), 3.0 TFSI quattro (272PS), 2.0 TDI (143PS), 2.0 TDI quattro (177PS), 3.0 TDI quattro (245PS).

In Germany, 2.0 TFSI quattro (180PS), 2.0 TDI (150PS), 2.0 TDI quattro (150PS) were added in 2013, with 2.0 TDI (150PS) replacing 2.0 TDI (143PS).

Pre-facelift styling

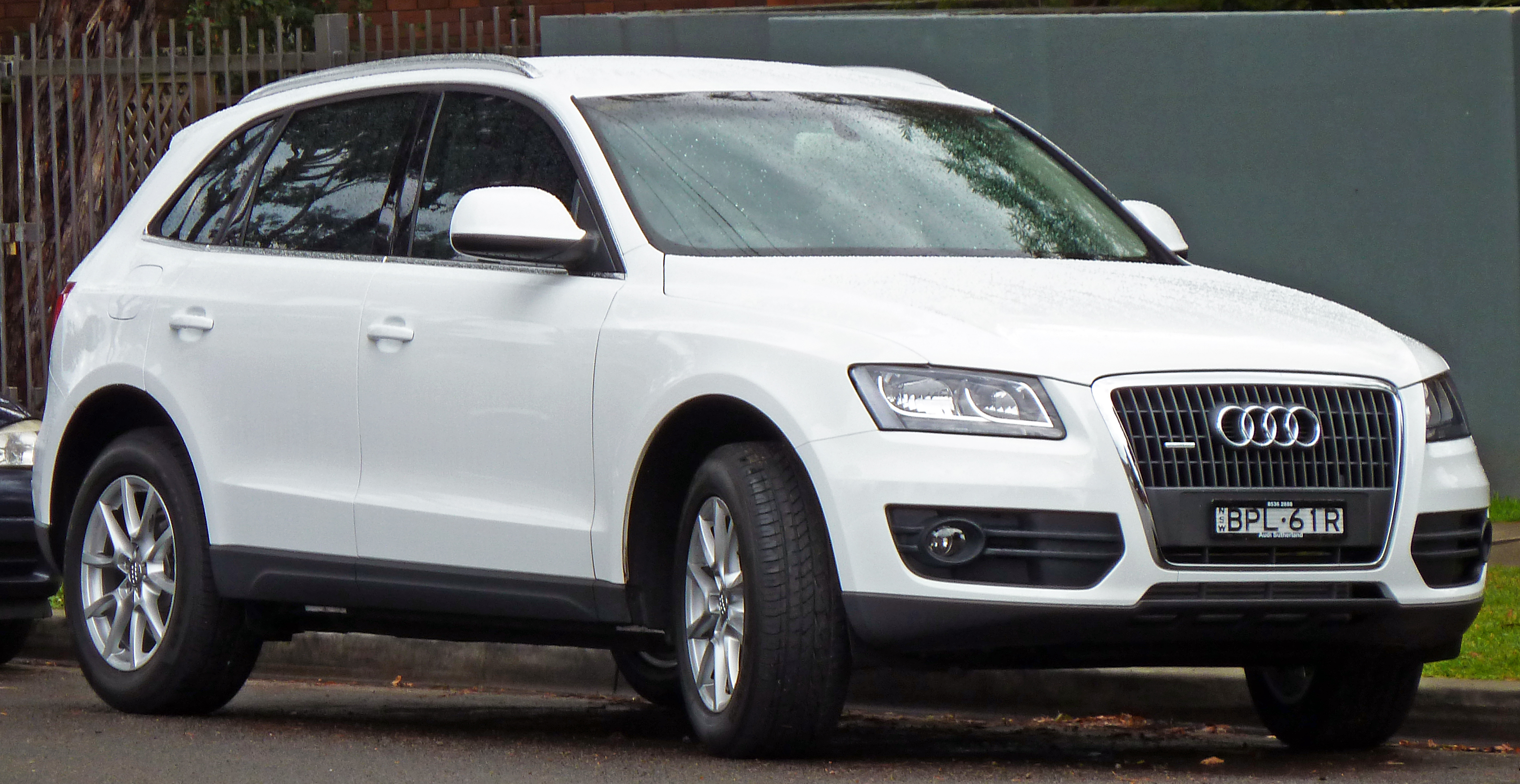
Front

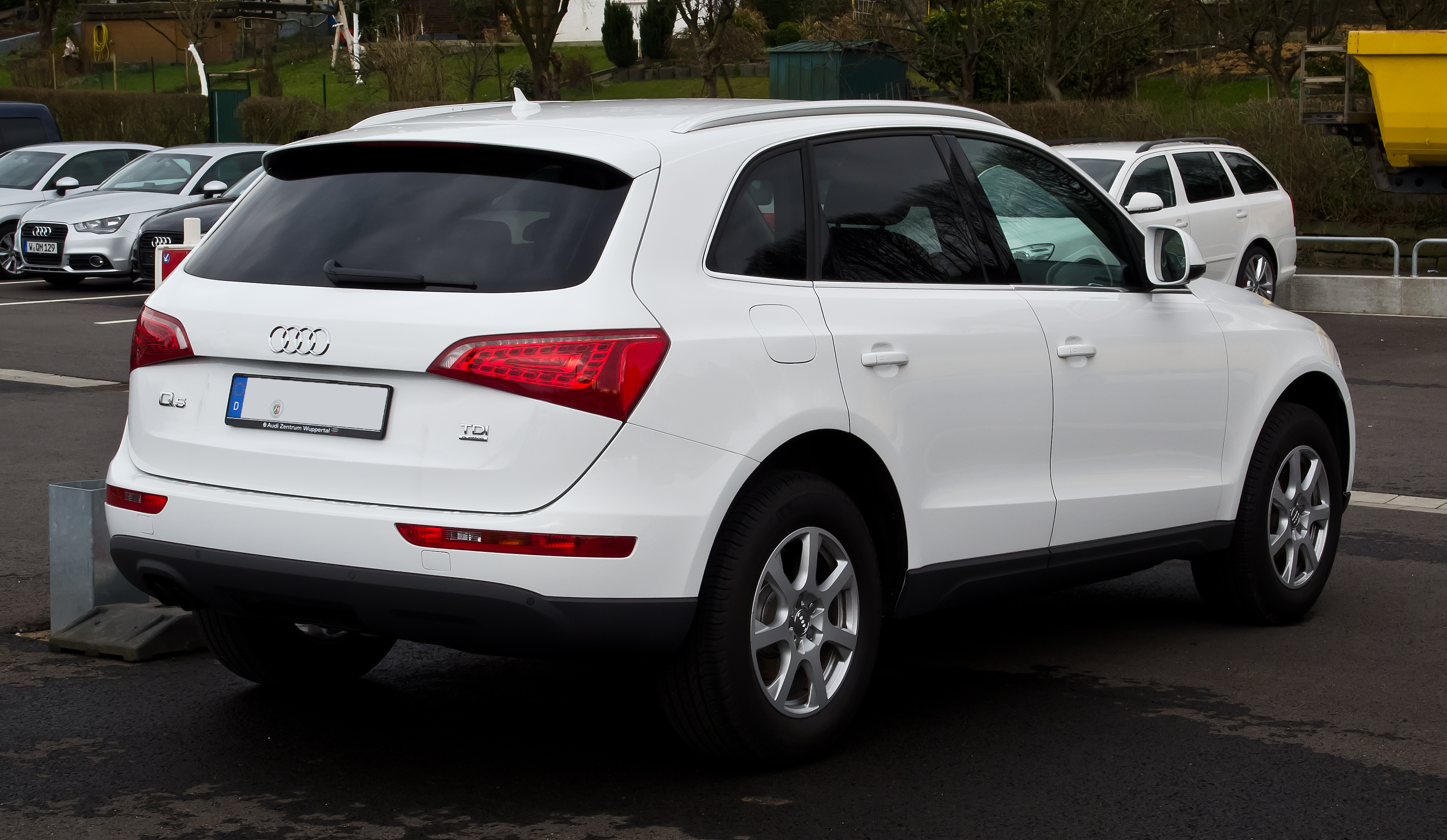
Rear

Post-facelift styling

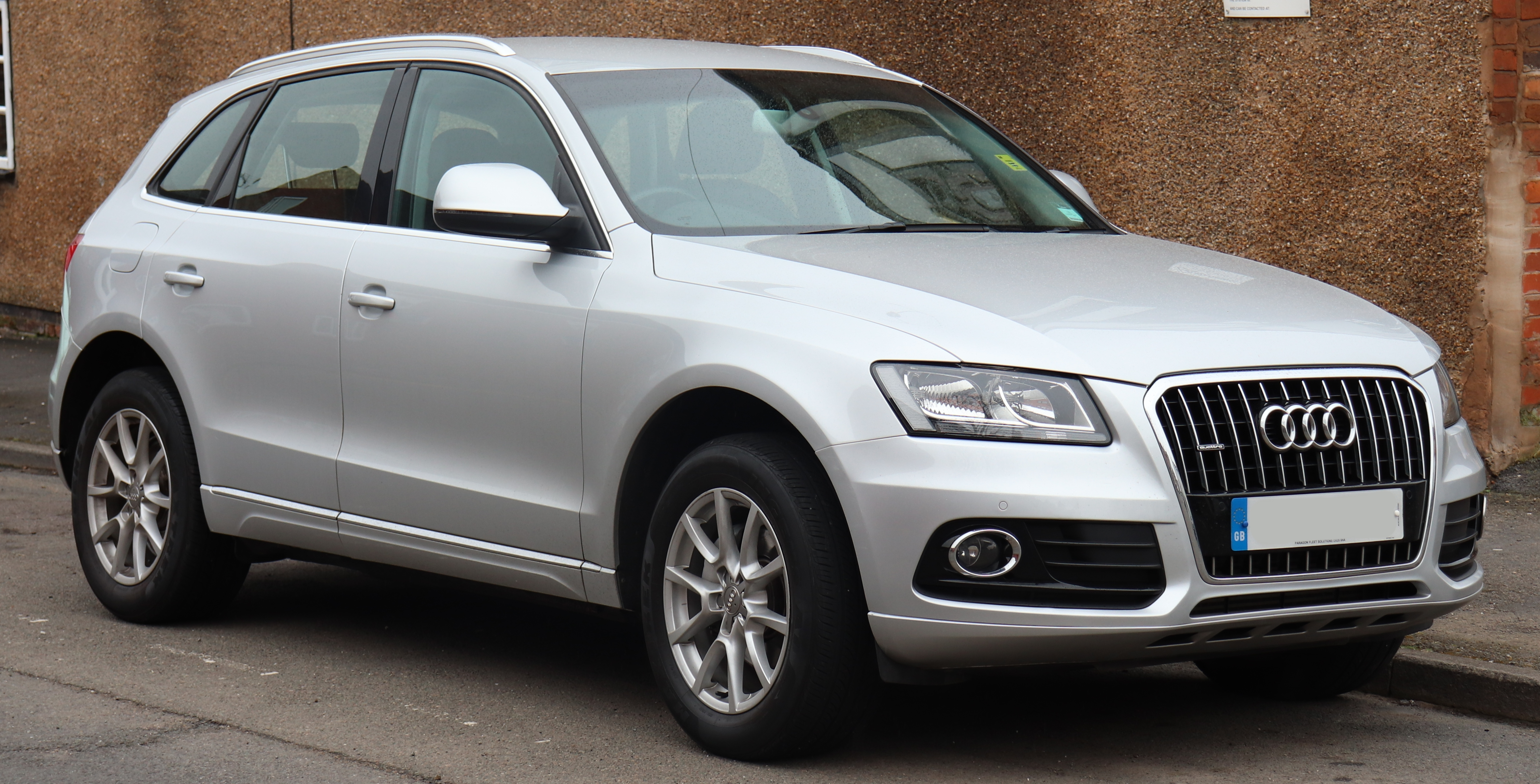
Front

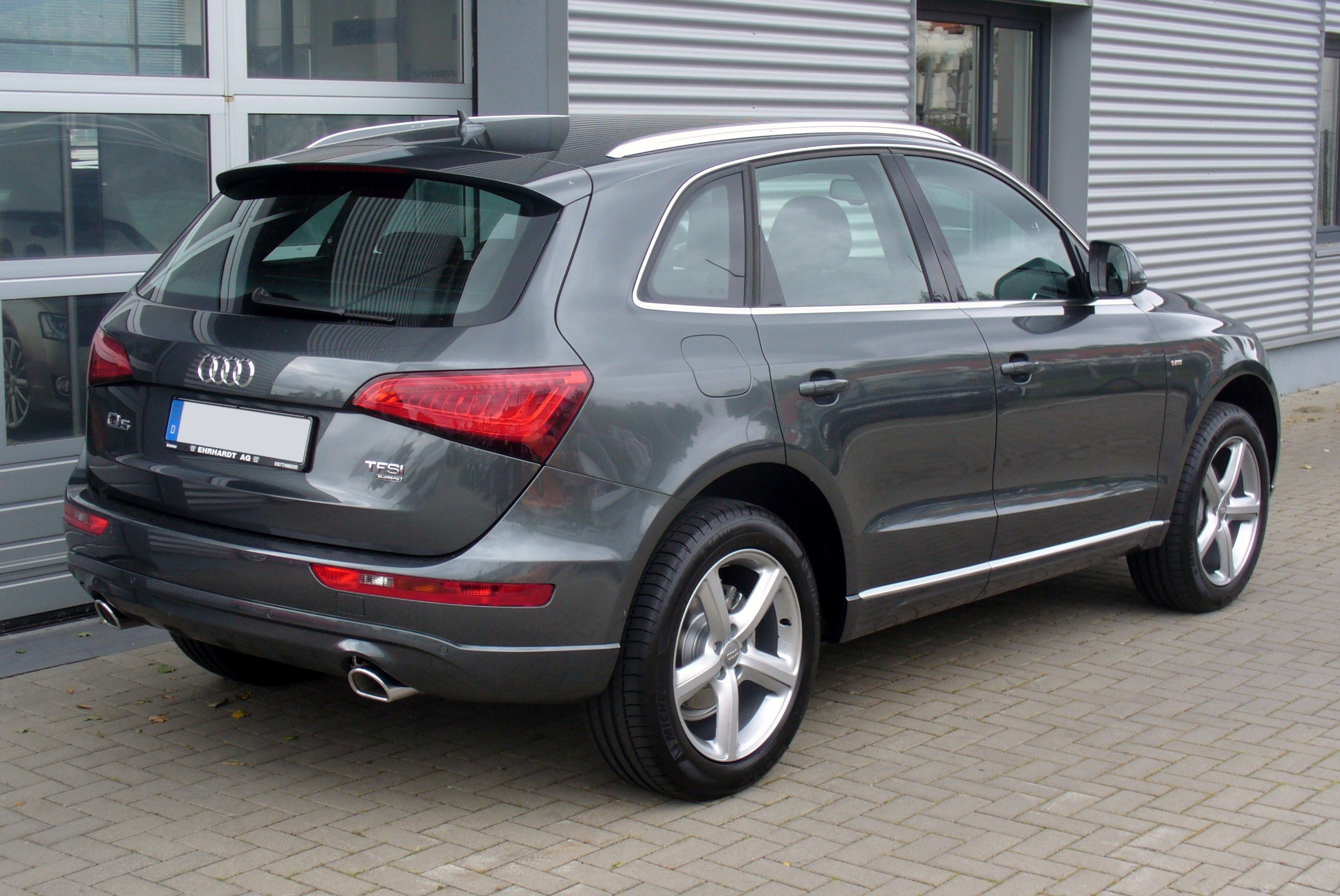
Rear

==== SQ5 TDI (2013–) ====
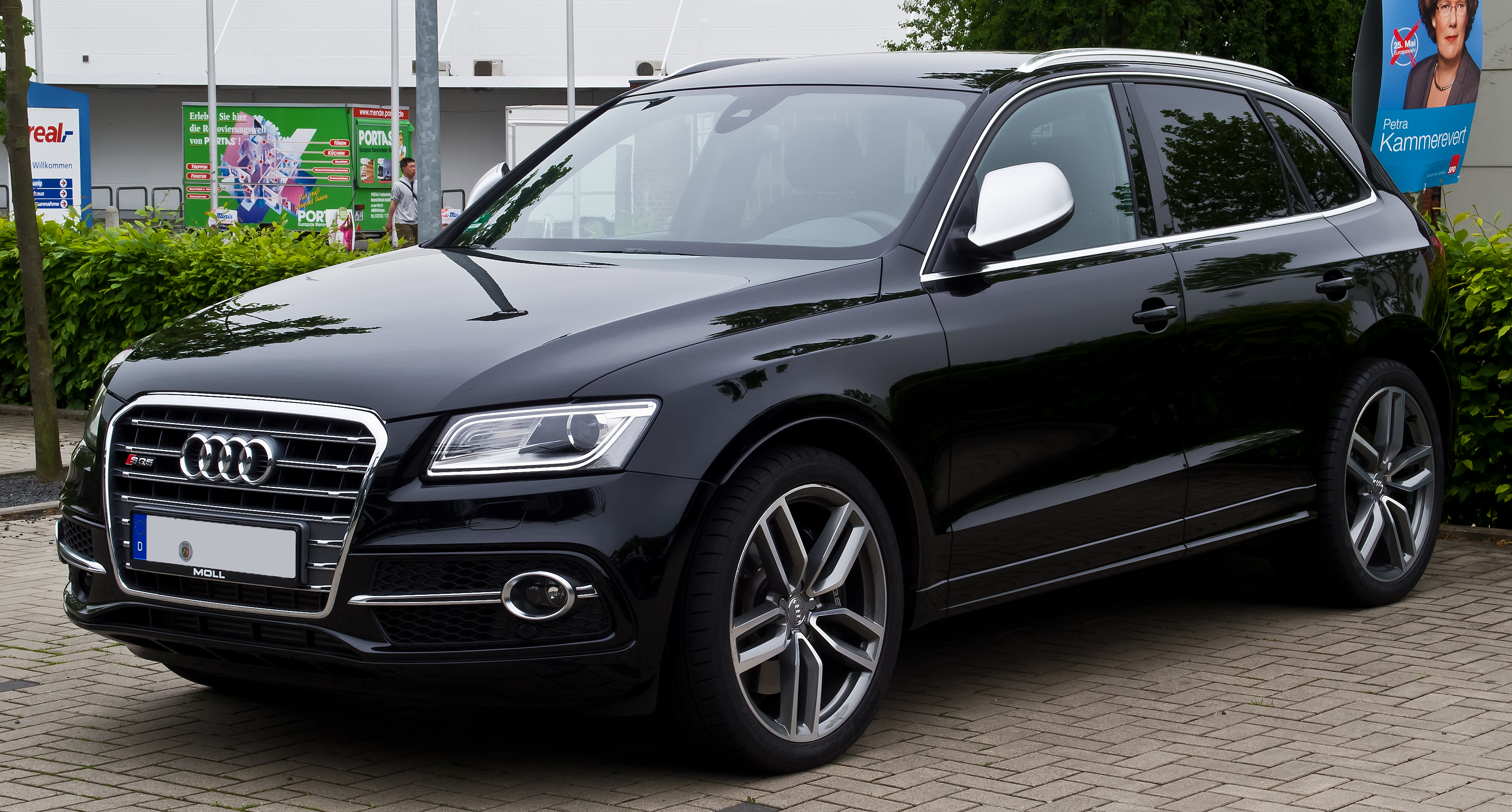
Audi SQ5 TDI

The SQ5 performance crossover SUV is the first Audi S model vehicle to feature a diesel engine. The primary power plant is a 3.0 L (2,967 cc), twin turbocharged V6 engine coupled to an 8-speed Tiptronic transmission, developing 313 PS at 3,900–4,500 rpm, and 650 N⋅m (479 lbf⋅ft) of torque at 1,450–2,800 rpm. It also features Audi's signature quattro permanent all-wheel drive system with torque vectoring transfer. Sport suspension lowers the vehicle body by 30 mm (1.18 in) and 20-inch 5 parallel-spoke wheels with 255/45 tires are fitted as standard, with the option of upgrading to 21-inch wheels. Other features of the SQ5 are black front brake callipers with Audi 'S' badges, an optional Audi drive select system, a platinum-grey single-frame grille with galvanized double bars, two SQ5 unique body colours (Estoril Blue or Panther Black), optional lunar silver headlining, Pearl Nappa leather/Alcantara power-adjustable sport seats with optional leather upholstery in a choice of four colours, brushed aluminium inlays with optional Carbon Atlas, Piano finish or Aluminium/Beaufort wood trim panels. The SQ5 TDI accelerates from 0–62 mph (100 km/h) in 5.1 secs, and is electronically limited to 155 mph. This is comparable to rival range-topping performance SUVs with diesel engines, such as the Porsche Cayenne S Diesel (0–60 mph (97 km/h): 5.7 s) and BMW X5 M50d (0–60 mph (97 km/h): 5.4 s), and also to high-performance petrol-powered SUVs, such as the Mercedes-Benz ML63 AMG (0–60 mph (97 km/h): 4.8 s), Porsche Cayenne Turbo S (0–60 mph (97 km/h): 4.1 s). These listed rivals are all larger and heavier, falling into the mid-size SUV class, and, as such, command significantly higher asking prices. A more realistic comparison may be made with the BMW X3 xDrive35d, which delivers slightly better economy (46.3 mpg to the SQ5's 41.5), though slightly lower performance (0–62 mph (100 km/h): 5.8 s, max speed: 149 mph (240 km/h)).

The SQ5 went on sale in the first quarter of 2013.

==== SQ5 TDI Audi exclusive concept (2013–) ====
It is a limited (50 units) version of the Audi SQ5 TDI with Aral Blue crystal effect body colour, black Fine Nappa leather upholstery with contrasting stitching in snow white, black sport seats covered in Fine Nappa leather, woven leather in the centre section of the seats, snow white Alcantara headlining, sunroof blind, inlays and applications shimmer.

The vehicle was unveiled in the 2012 Paris Motor Show, and went on sale in the first quarter of 2013. In 2015 Audi introduced a 'plus' tdi model, with 340 PS (250 kW) and 700 N⋅m (516 lbf⋅ft), quilted nappa leather seats, external black details and 21-inch wheels as standard equipment.

==== SQ5 3.0 TFSI quattro (2013–) ====
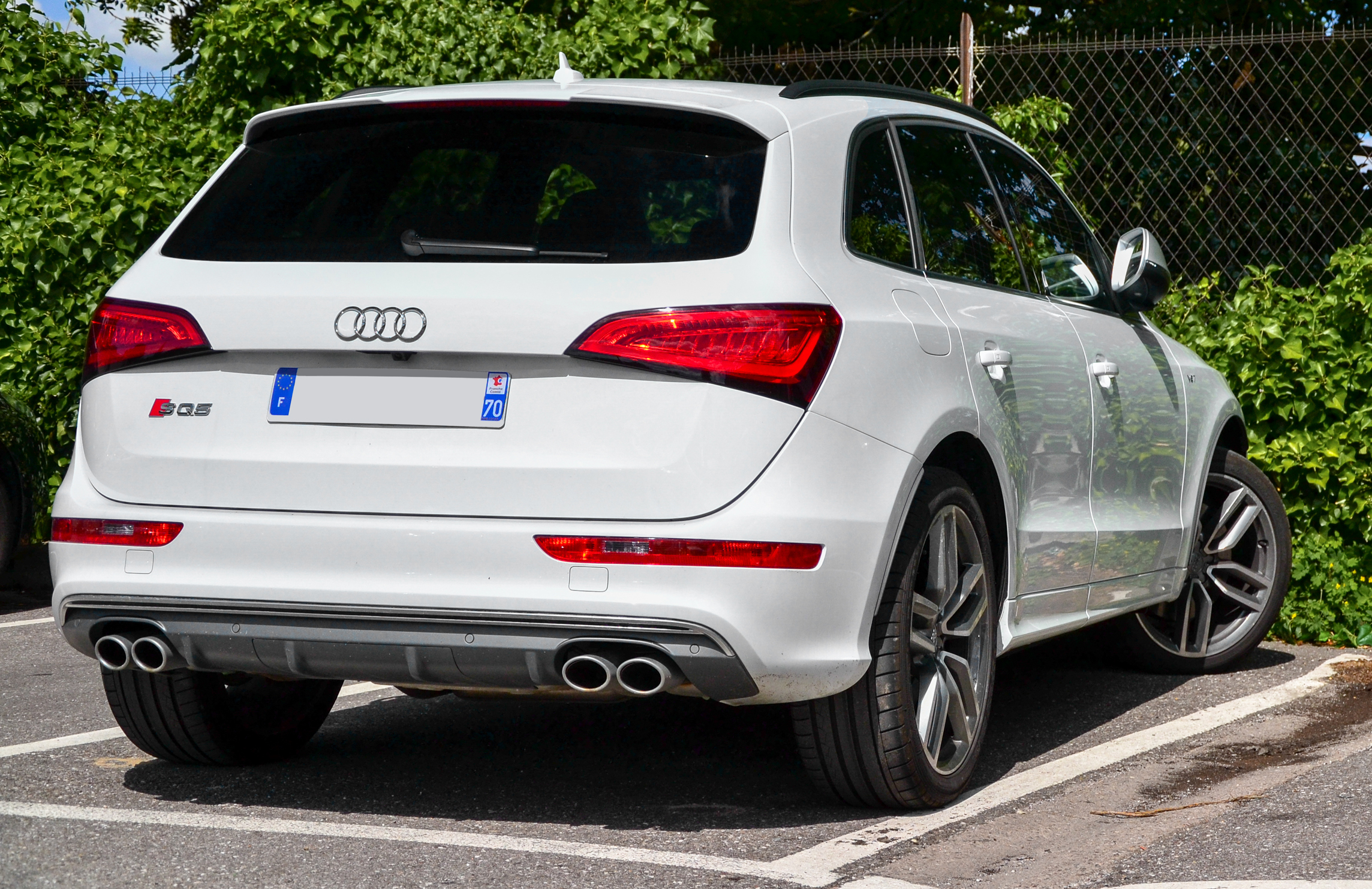
Audi SQ5 TDI

It is a petrol version of the SQ5 with 3.0 TFSI engine rated 354 PS (260 kW; 349 hp) at 6,000–6,500 rpm and 470 N⋅m (346.65 lbf⋅ft) at 4,000–4,500 rpm, eight-speed tiptronic transmission, quattro permanent all-wheel drive with torque vectoring, 20-inch wheels with 255/45-series tires (optional 21-inch wheels), platinum grey radiator grille with horizontal double bars in aluminium look, choice of 2 crystal-effect body colours (Estoril Blue, Panther Black), instruments feature grey dials and white numerals, pedals and shift paddles in shiny aluminium-look finish, black interior with headlining optionally available in Moon Silver, power-adjustable sport seats upholstered in Pearl Nappa leather and Alcantara (option four different colours of leather), standard brushed aluminium inlays (optional Carbon Atlas, Piano finish or layered aluminium and wood in Beaufort black). The vehicle was unveiled in 2013 Detroit Auto Show.

The vehicle was designed for United States, Canada, Russia, China, Japan, Singapore, South Korea, South Africa, Mexico, Brazil, Argentina, Chile and Ukraine markets.

US model was set to arrive at U.S. dealerships in the third quarter of 2013 as 2014 model year vehicle.

==== Engines ====
Petrol engines
Model	Year	Engine type	Power, torque at rpm
Q5 2.0 TFSI hybrid quattro	2012–	1,984 cc (1.984 L; 121.1 cu in) I4 turbo (CHJA)	211 PS (155 kW; 208 hp) at 4,300–6,000, 350 N⋅m (258.15 lbf⋅ft) at 1,500–4,200
Q5 2.0 TFSI hybrid quattro	2012–	electric motor, 266V, 1.3kWh battery pack	54 PS (40 kW; 53 hp) at ?, 210 N⋅m (154.89 lbf⋅ft) at ?
Q5 2.0 TFSI hybrid quattro	2012–	combined	245 PS (180 kW; 242 hp) at ?, 480 N⋅m (354.03 lbf⋅ft) at ?
Q5 2.0 TFSI quattro (180PS)	2012–	1,984 cc (1.984 L; 121.1 cu in) I4 turbo (CDNB)	180 PS (132 kW; 178 hp) at 4,000–6,000, 320 N⋅m (236.02 lbf⋅ft) at 1,500–3,800
Q5 2.0 TFSI quattro (225PS)	2012–	1,984 cc (1.984 L; 121.1 cu in) I4 turbo (CDNC)	225 PS (165 kW; 222 hp) at 4,500–6,250, 350 N⋅m (258.15 lbf⋅ft) at 1,500–4,500
Q5 3.0 TFSI quattro (272PS)	2012–	2,995 cc (2.995 L; 182.8 cu in) V6 supercharged (CTUC/CTVA)	272 PS (200 kW; 268 hp) at 4,780–6,500, 400 N⋅m (295.02 lbf⋅ft) at 2,150–4,780/2,500–4,780
SQ5 3.0 TFSI quattro (354PS)	2013–	2,995 cc (2.995 L; 182.8 cu in) V6 supercharged ()	354 PS (260 kW; 349 hp) at 5,500–6,500, 470 N⋅m (346.65 lbf⋅ft) at 4,000-4,500

Diesel engines
Model	Year	Engine type	Power, torque at rpm
Q5 2.0 TDI (143PS)	2012–	1,968 cc (1.968 L; 120.1 cu in) I4 turbo common rail (CAGA)	143 PS (105 kW; 141 hp) at 4,200, 320 N⋅m (236.02 lbf⋅ft) at 1,750–2,500
Q5 2.0 TDI (150PS)	2013–	1,968 cc (1.968 L; 120.1 cu in) I4 turbo common rail (CJCD)	150 PS (110 kW; 148 hp) at 4,200, 320 N⋅m (236.02 lbf⋅ft) at 1,750–2,500
Q5 2.0 TDI quattro (150PS)	2013–	1,968 cc (1.968 L; 120.1 cu in) I4 turbo common rail (CJCD)	150 PS (110 kW; 148 hp) at 4,200, 320 N⋅m (236.02 lbf⋅ft) at 1,750–2,500
Q5 2.0 TDI quattro (177PS)	2012–	1,968 cc (1.968 L; 120.1 cu in) I4 turbo common rail (CGLC)	177 PS (130 kW; 175 hp) at 4,200, 380 N⋅m (280.27 lbf⋅ft) at 1,750–2,500
Q5 3.0 TDI quattro (245PS)	2012–	2,967 cc (2.967 L; 181.1 cu in) V6 turbo common rail (CDUD)	245 PS (180 kW; 242 hp) at 4,000–4,500, 580 N⋅m (427.79 lbf⋅ft) at 1,750–2750
Q5 3.0 TDI clean diesel quattro (258PS)	2013–	2,967 cc (2.967 L; 181.1 cu in) V6 turbo common rail ()	258 PS (190 kW; 254 hp) at 4,000–4,500, 580 N⋅m (427.79 lbf⋅ft) at 1,750–2,500
SQ5 3.0 TDI quattro (313PS)	2013–	2,967 cc (2.967 L; 181.1 cu in) V6 twin turbo common rail (CGQB)	313 PS (230 kW; 309 hp) at 3,900–4,500, 650 N⋅m (479.42 lbf⋅ft) at 1,450–2,800

All engines include start-stop system. 3.0 TFSI quattro (272PS) replaced 3.2 FSI quattro.

==== Transmissions ====
Petrol engines
Model	Year	Types
Q5 2.0 TFSI hybrid quattro	2012–	8-speed Tiptronic
Q5 2.0 TFSI quattro (180PS)	2012–	6-speed manual
Q5 2.0 TFSI quattro (225PS)	2012–	6-speed manual, 8-speed Tiptronic
Q5 3.0 TFSI quattro (272PS)	2012–	8-speed Tiptronic
SQ5 3.0 TFSI quattro (354PS)	2013–	8-speed Tiptronic

Diesel engines
Model	Year	Types
Q5 2.0 TDI (143PS)	2012–	6-speed manual
Q5 2.0 TDI (150PS)	2013–	6-speed manual
Q5 2.0 TDI quattro (150PS)	2013–	6-speed manual
Q5 2.0 TDI quattro (177PS)	2012–	6-speed manual, 7-speed S tronic
Q5 3.0 TDI quattro (245PS)	2012–	7-speed S tronic
Q5 3.0 TDI clean diesel quattro (258PS)	2013–	7-speed S tronic
SQ5 TDI 3.0 TDI quattro (313PS)	2013–	8-speed Tiptronic with DSP and Sport mode
SQ5 TDI 3.0 TDI quattro (326PS)	2016–	8-speed Tiptronic with DSP and Sport mode
SQ5 plus TDI 3.0 TDI quattro (340PS)	2016–	8-speed Tiptronic with DSP and Sport mode

=== Safety ===
ANCAP test results* Audi Q5 (2009)
Test	Score
Overall	5 /5 stars
Frontal offset	15.21/16
Side impact	16/16
Pole	2/2
Seat belt reminders	2/3
Whiplash protection	Not Assessed
Pedestrian protection	Marginal
Electronic stability control	Standard

An NHTSA-tested 2014 Q5. Full frontal-width test at 56 km/h (35 mph)

NHTSA tested a 2016 Q5. Euro NCAP tested a 2009 Audi Q5, 5-door SUV with front airbags, side airbags, seatbelt pretensioners and load limiters as standard and scored it accordingly:

NHTSA		Euro NCAP	
Overall:	4/5 stars	Overall:	5/5 stars
Frontal – Driver:	4/5 stars	Adult occupant:	33 pts / 92%
Frontal – Passenger:	5/5 stars	Child occupant:	41 pts / 84%
Side – Driver:	5/5 stars	Pedestrian:	12 pts / 32%
Side – Passenger:	5/5 stars	Driver assist:	5 pts / 71%
Side Pole – Driver:	5/5 stars		
Rollover:	/ 15.1%		

The Insurance Institute for Highway Safety also crash-tested the Q5, and presented the following results (ratings from 'poor' to 'good'):

Category	Rating
Moderate overlap front	Good
Side	Good
Roof strength	Good
Head restraints and seats	Good

=== Emissions concerns ===
On the 19 August 2020, tagesschau.de reported that "turning the steering wheel changes exhaust emissions" significantly under test conditions.

The first generation 3.2L FSI engine is extremely prone to carbon buildup in the secondary air injection system, resulting in an extremely costly and necessary repair—which often rears its head following the warranty period.

== Second generation (Typ FY; 2016) ==
Second generation
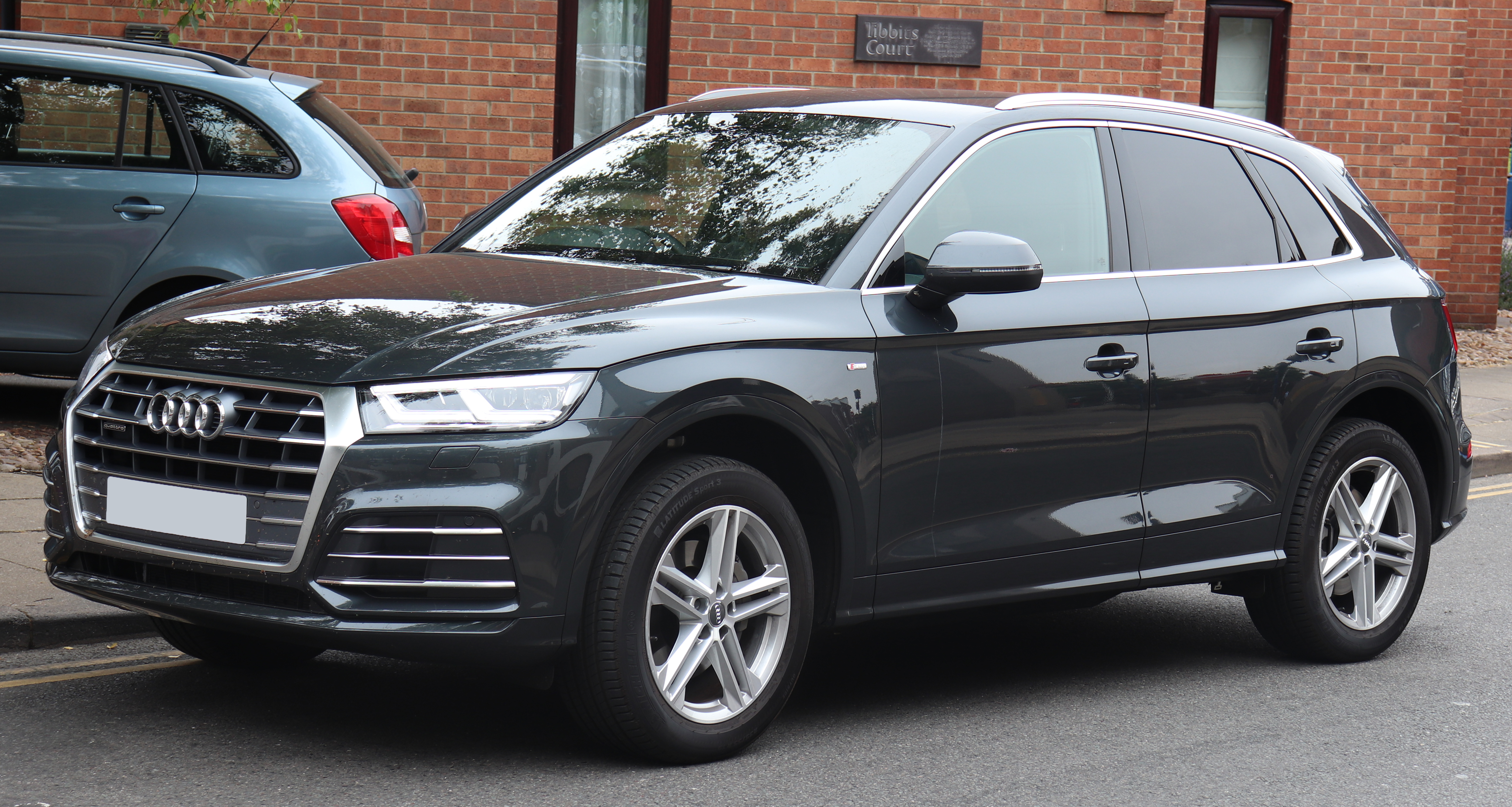

Overview
- Model code: FY
- Production: September 2016 – February 2025; August 2019 — April 2025 (PHEV)
- Assembly: Mexico: San José Chiapa (Audi México, S.A. de C.V.); China: Changchun (Q5L, FAW-VW); India: Aurangabad (Audi and Skoda Auto India Pvt Ltd)
- Designer: Wolfgang Egger

Body and chassis
- Body style: 5-door SUV; 5-door coupé SUV (Sportback)
- Platform: MLB evo

Powertrain
- Engine: petrol: 2.0 L TFSI I4; 2.0 L TFSI MHEV I4; 2.0 L TFSIe PHEV; 3.0 L TFSI V6 (SQ5, outside Europe); diesel: 2.0 L TDI I4; 2.0 L TDI MHEV I4; 3.0 L TDI V6
- Electric motor: 48-volt main electrical system (MHEV); Permanent-magnet electric motor (PHEV)
- Transmission: 7-speed DSG (4-cylinder variants); 8-speed ZF 8HP automatic (SQ5 & 3.0 TDI models)
- Hybrid drivetrain: Mild Hybrid 48V (Q5 45 TFSI quattro / 40 TDI Quattro); PHEV (Q5 55 TFSIe)
- Battery: Lithium-ion

Dimensions
- Wheelbase: 2,819 mm (111.0 in); Q5L: 2,907 mm (114.4 in)
- Length: 4,682 mm (184.3 in); Q5L: 4,751 mm (187.0 in)
- Width: 1,893 mm (74.5 in)
- Height: 1,662 mm (65.4 in)

The second generation Q5 (Typ FY) was revealed at the 2016 Paris Motor Show. Production began at the Audi Mexico plant on 30 September 2016, for the 2017 model year.

=== Long wheelbase version (Q5L), (2018–2025) ===
A long wheelbase version was unveiled at the Beijing Auto Show, with 88 mm (3.5 in) added to the car, resulting in 23 percent more legroom.

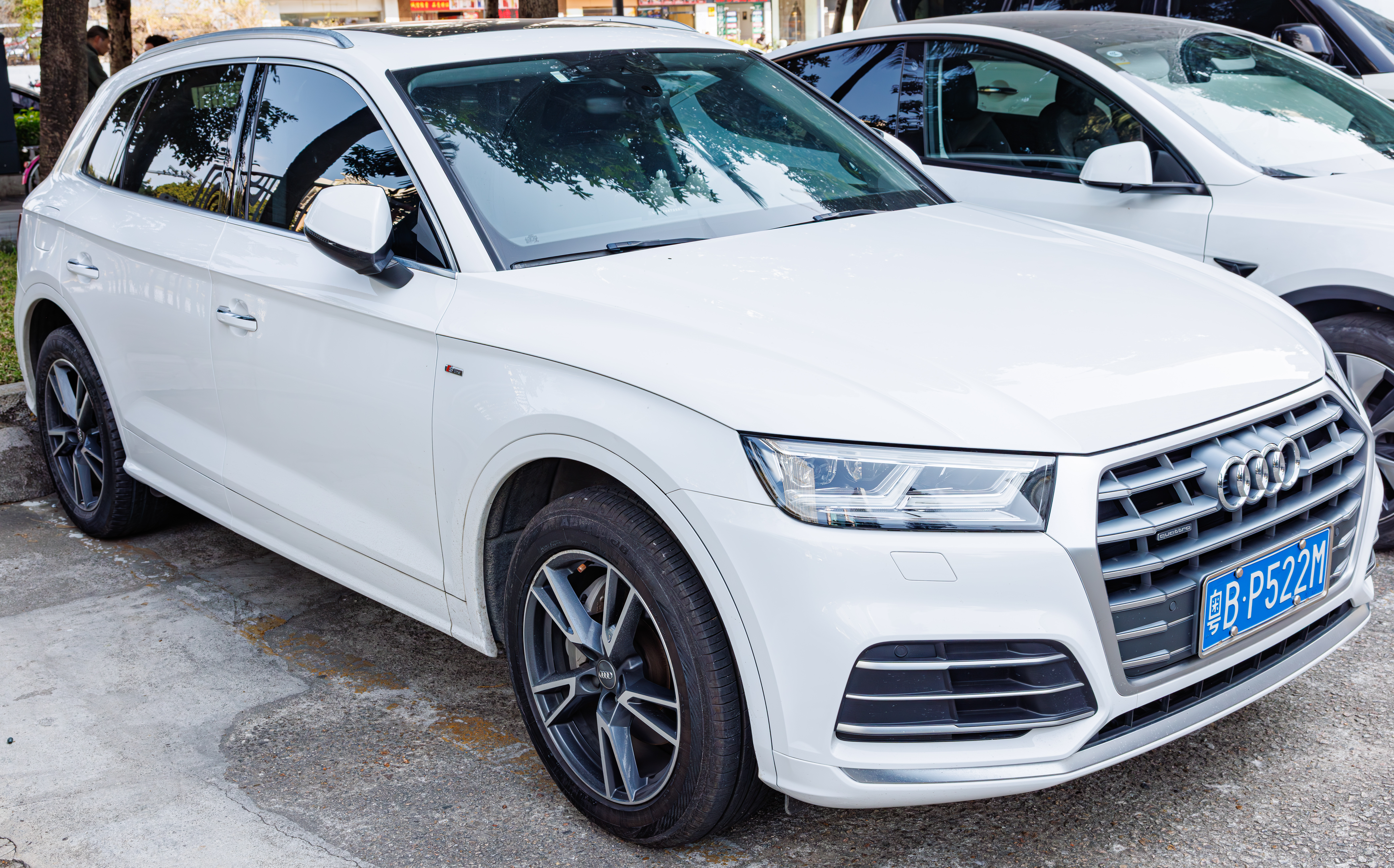
Q5L

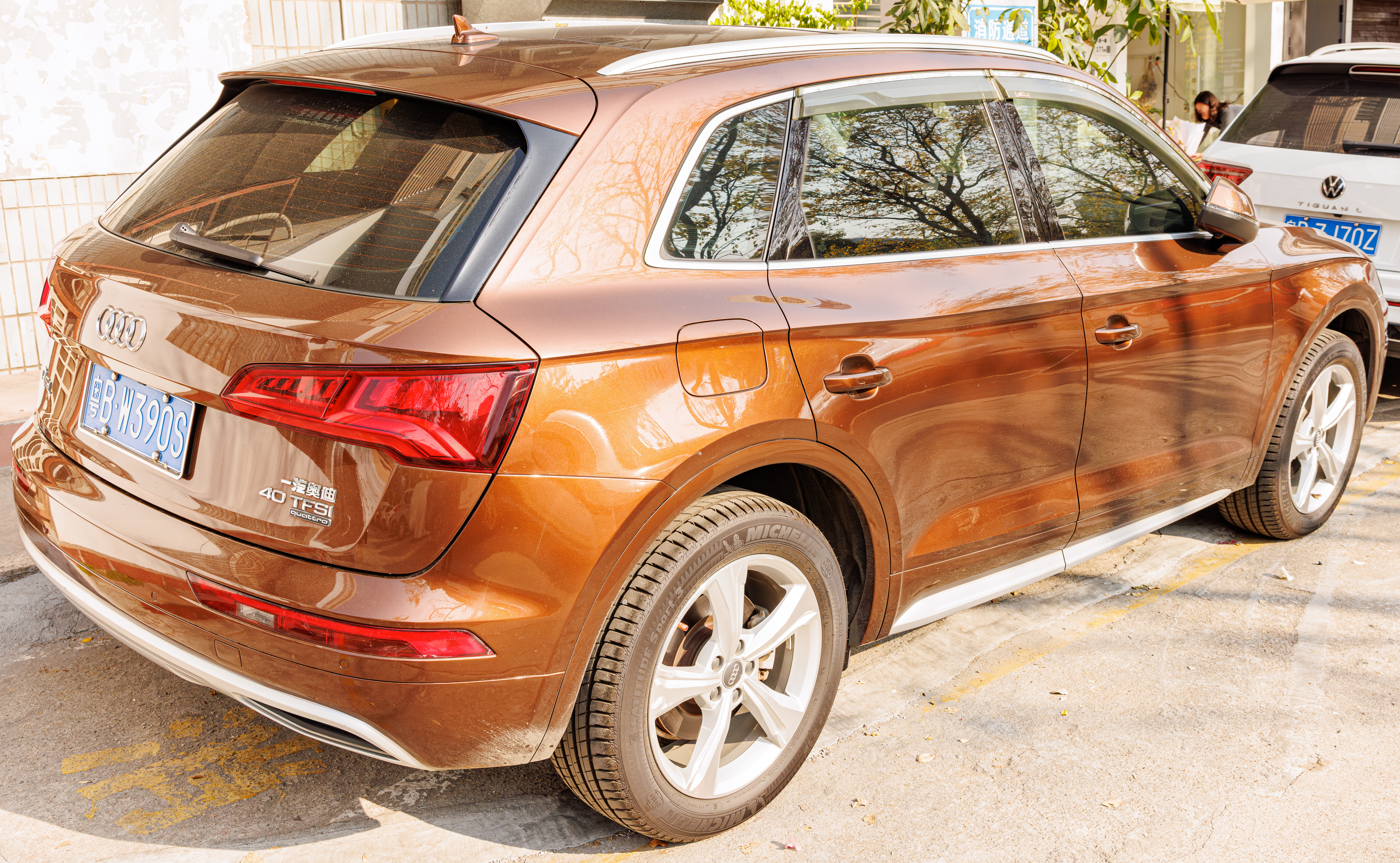
Q5L

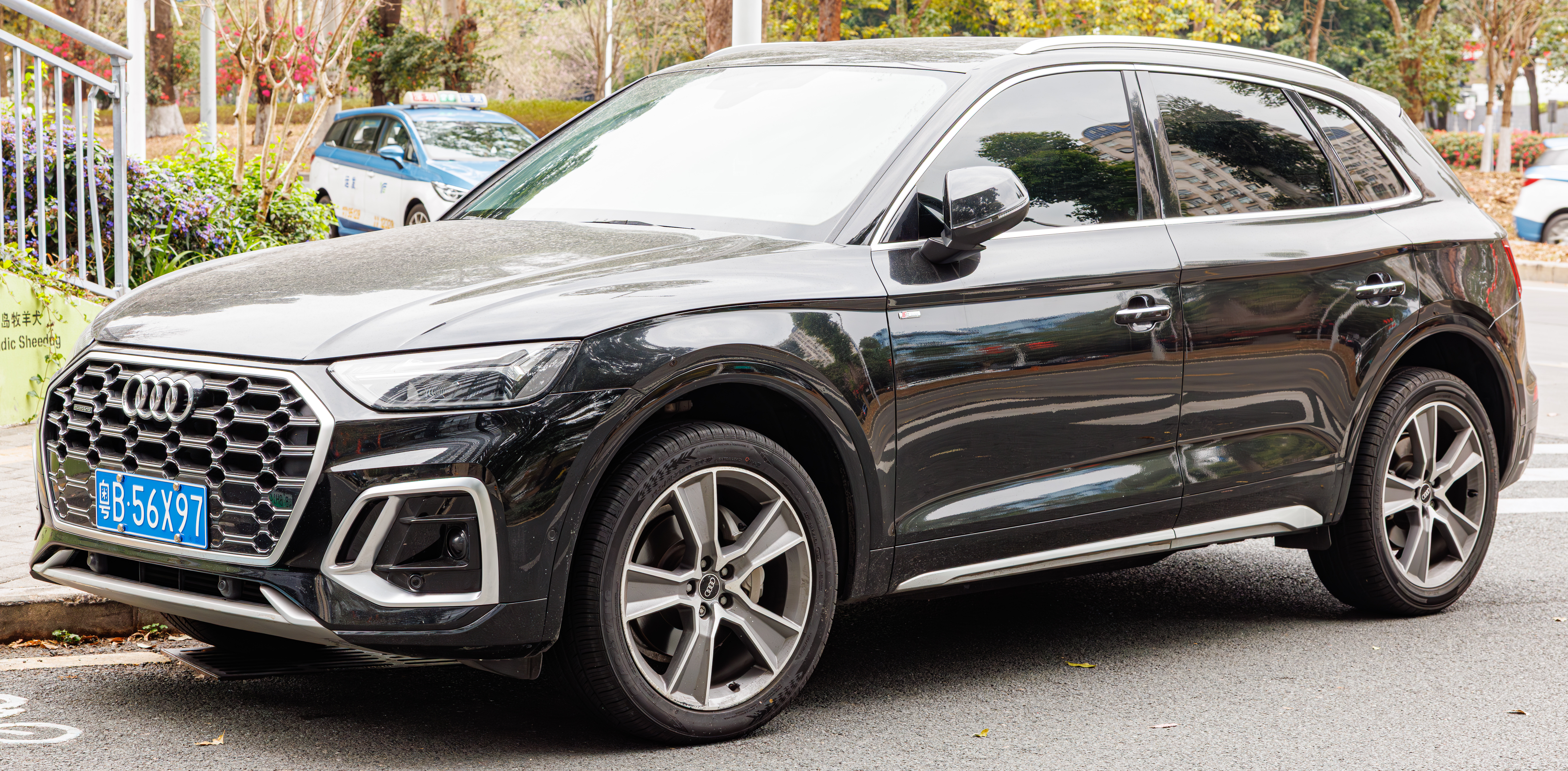
Q5L facelift

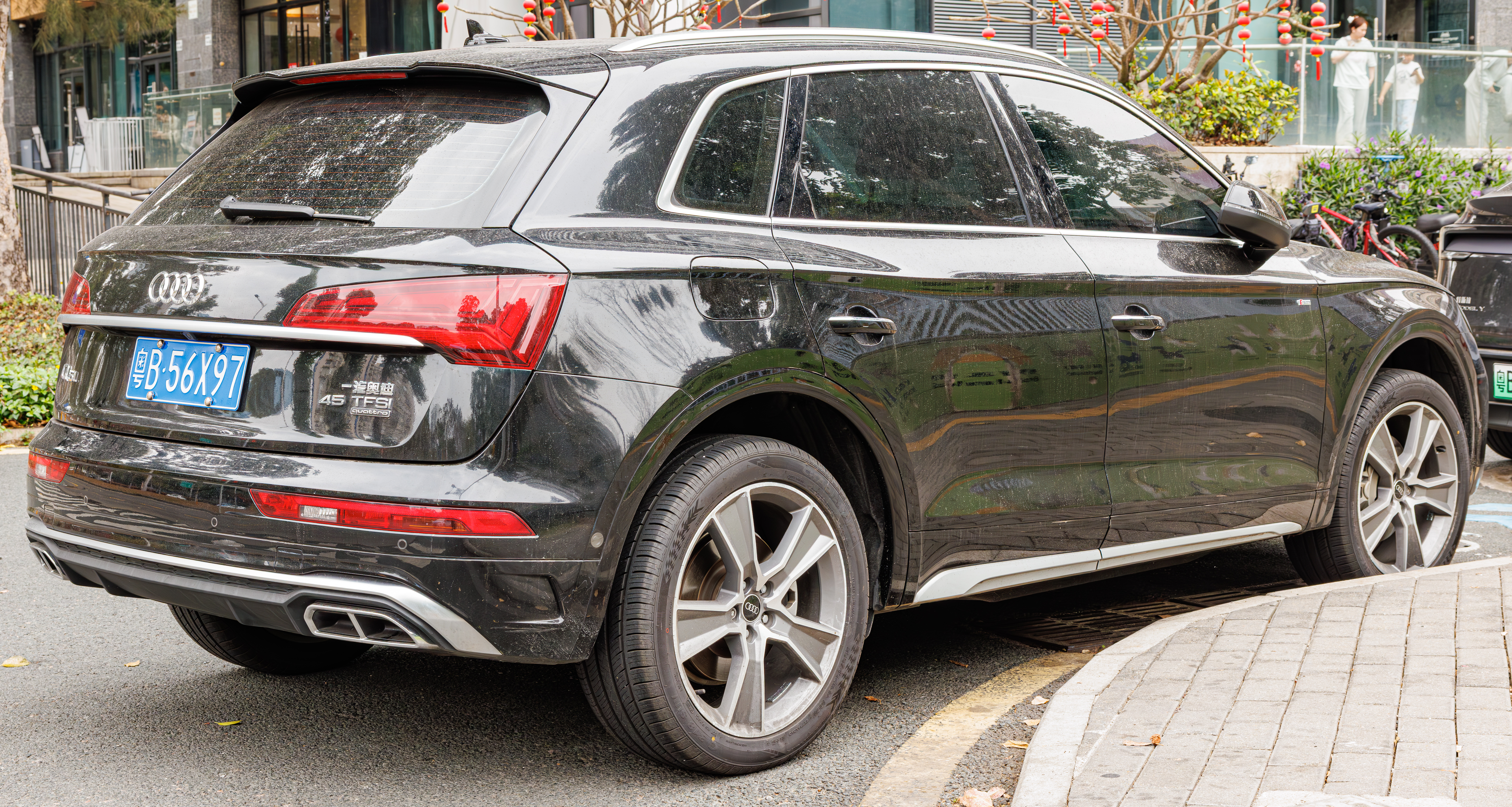
Q5L facelift

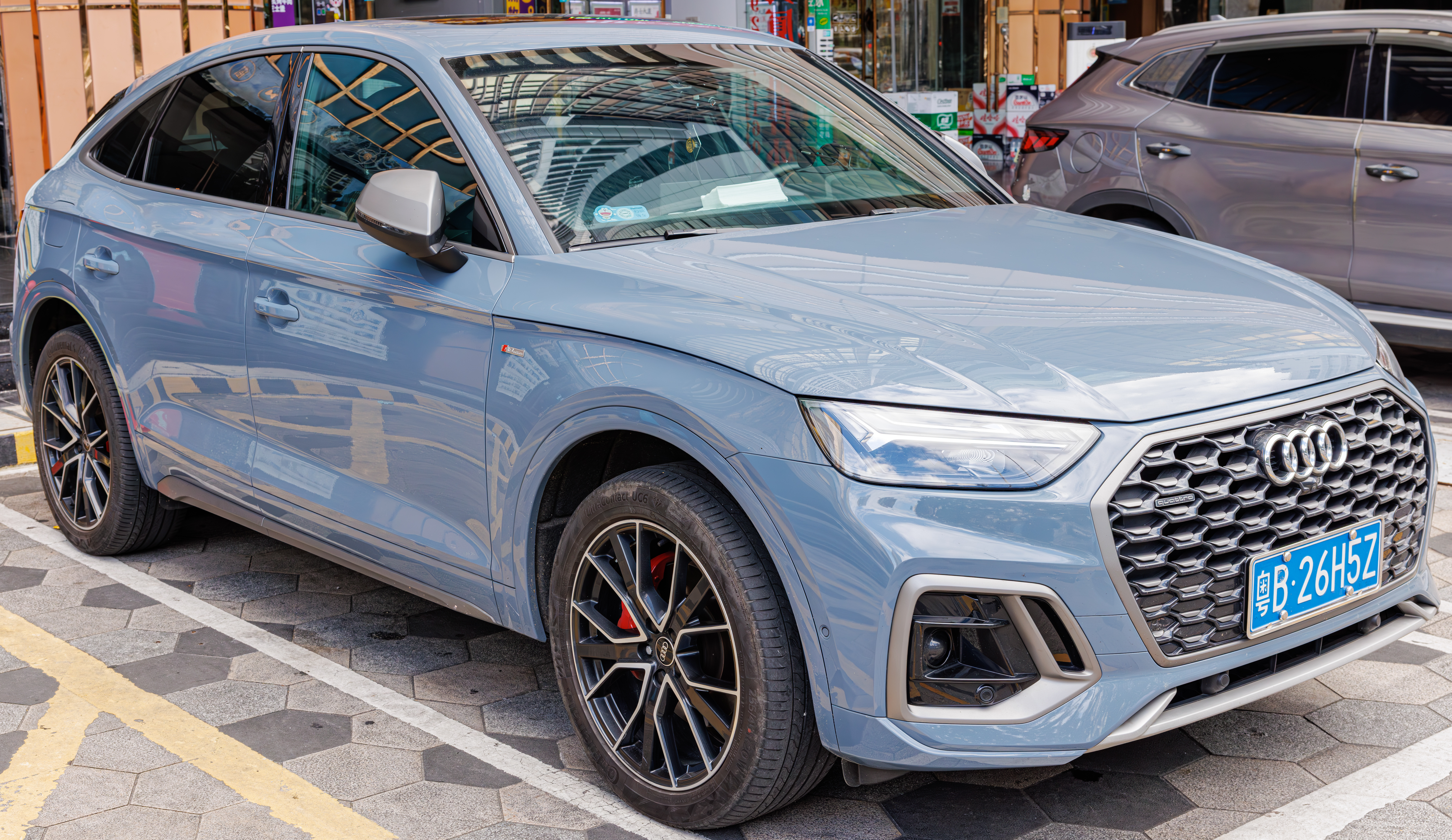
Q5L Sportback

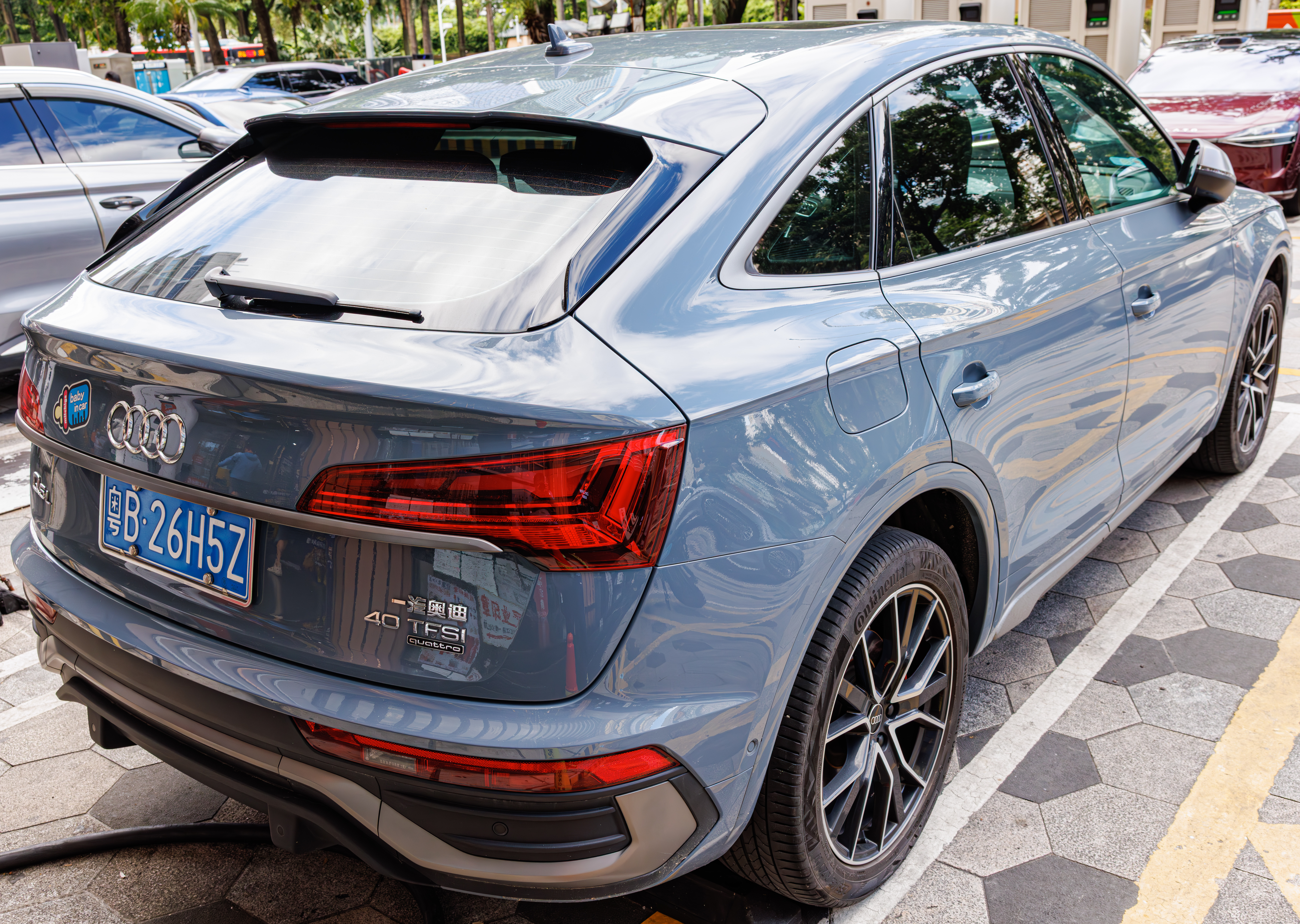
Q5L Sportback

=== Markets ===
==== Asia ====
The second generation of the Q5 will be the first generation of the Q5 to be sold in Bangladesh.

The Q5 was launched in Thailand in August 2017, where a sole S-line powered by a 2.0 TFSI engine (45 TFSI) and 2.0 TDI engine (40 TDI) with a Quattro all wheel drive system is available.

The Q5 was launched in Malaysia in March 2019, where a sole Sport trim line powered by a 2.0 TFSI engine with a Quattro all wheel drive system is available.

In August 2021, the facelifted Q5 was launched in Malaysia, with the sports-oriented S-Line trim package. It gets a 2.0 TFSI engine with mild-hybrid tech, Quattro AWD and the S Tronic dual-clutch transmission. Not long after, the Q5 Sportback also made its local debut in Malaysia.

==== North America ====
The second generation Q5 was launched in North America in 2018. Production shifted from Germany to the new Audi México, S.A. de C.V. factory in San José Chiapa, Puebla, México. The Q5 was launched with a 2.0 TFSI petrol engine. Power output was 252 hp (188 kW; 255 PS) and 273 lb⋅ft (370 N⋅m). Audi's Quattro all-wheel drive system is standard, however it uses ‘Quattro with Ultra Technology’. According to Audi, Ultra technology improves efficiency by decoupling the driveshaft to the rear wheels when all-wheel drive is not needed. Essentially the vehicle becomes front wheel drive when cruising, or in other driving situations where the vehicle's computers determine all-wheel traction is not needed. Audi claims the system is able to re-engage power to the rear wheels within milliseconds of the system detecting or predicting slip or the driver accelerating aggressively.

Unlike in the previous 8R generation Q5, US vehicles are only offered with the 2.0T TFSI I-4 engine. The 2.0T ‘45 TFSI’ model offers acceleration similar to the previous generation's 3.0 TFSI Supercharged V6 (face-lifted Q5 8R, 2013–2017) while using less fuel and reduced emissions. No TDI version will be offered in North America due to the fallout from the diesel emissions scandal. Bucking an industry-wide trend of moving away from dual clutch transmissions for the latest generation of conventional torque converter automatics, Audi actually replaced the previous generation's ZF 8HP 8-speed automatic transmission for their own 7-speed S-Tronic dual clutch gearbox.

The SQ5 is offered as a performance variant of the Q5. In North American spec, it uses a 3.0L DOHC direct-injected Miller Cycle-capable 90° V6 with a single twin-scroll turbocharger. This engine, dubbed EA839, is a substantially reworked version of the previous-generation supercharged V6 (EA837) that was used in the first generation Q5 3.0T and SQ5. Power output for the turbocharged engines remains at 264 kW (354 hp), however torque increases to 500 N⋅m (369 lb⋅ft) at only 1370 rpm. Unlike the lesser powered Q5 ‘45 TFSI’ 2.0T, Audi retained ZF's 8HP transmission for the SQ5, and it also utilizes the full-time rear-biased quattro AWD system. Utilizing the Torsen CSM self-locking center differential, default power distribution is 40% front/60% rear. The center differential can instantaneously divert up to 70% of available engine power to the front wheels or up to 85% to the rear wheels. This permanent version of the Quattro AWD system is also available with the torque-vectoring rear "sport differential".

For the 2019 model year, heated front seats, rear electric child locks, 7-inch infotainment screen, and roof crossbars became standard equipment. For the Premium Plus trim, rear USB charge ports and wireless charging became standard while for Prestige trims, park assist was made standard. The Convenience Package was expanded to include the Audi side assist and Audi pre sense rear safety systems. In addition, Audi introduced a "black optic" package for the Q5, featuring black exterior trim and unique wheels. The SQ5 also became available in the Premium trim.

In 2020, Audi introduced the Q5 TFSI e plug-in hybrid variant. It featured a 14.1 kWh lithium-ion battery, giving an EPA estimated 20 miles (32 km) of range. A heat pump was implemented into the climate control system, providing for greater heating efficiency. The plug-in variant also received the Turbo Blue and Daytona Gray colors, available only on the plug-in variant and SQ5 models. It produced 362 hp (270 kW; 367 PS) and 369 lb⋅ft (500 N⋅m) of torque and had a 0–60 mph (0–97 km/h) time of 5.0 seconds, nearly a second faster than the standard Q5. For the 2022 model year, the battery size was increased to 17.9 kWh, increasing the EPA range to 23 miles (37 km).

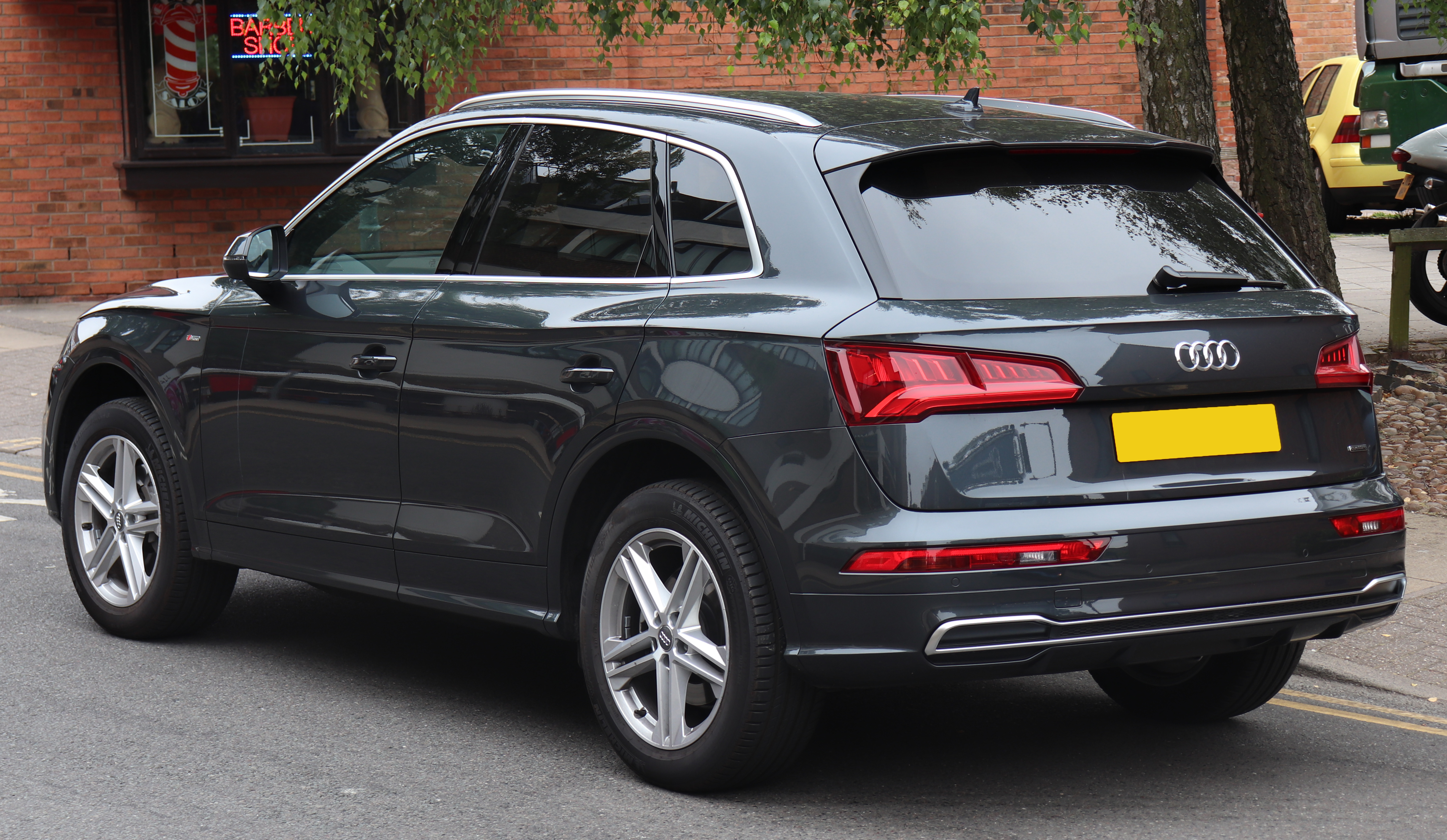
Q5 S-Line TDI quattro

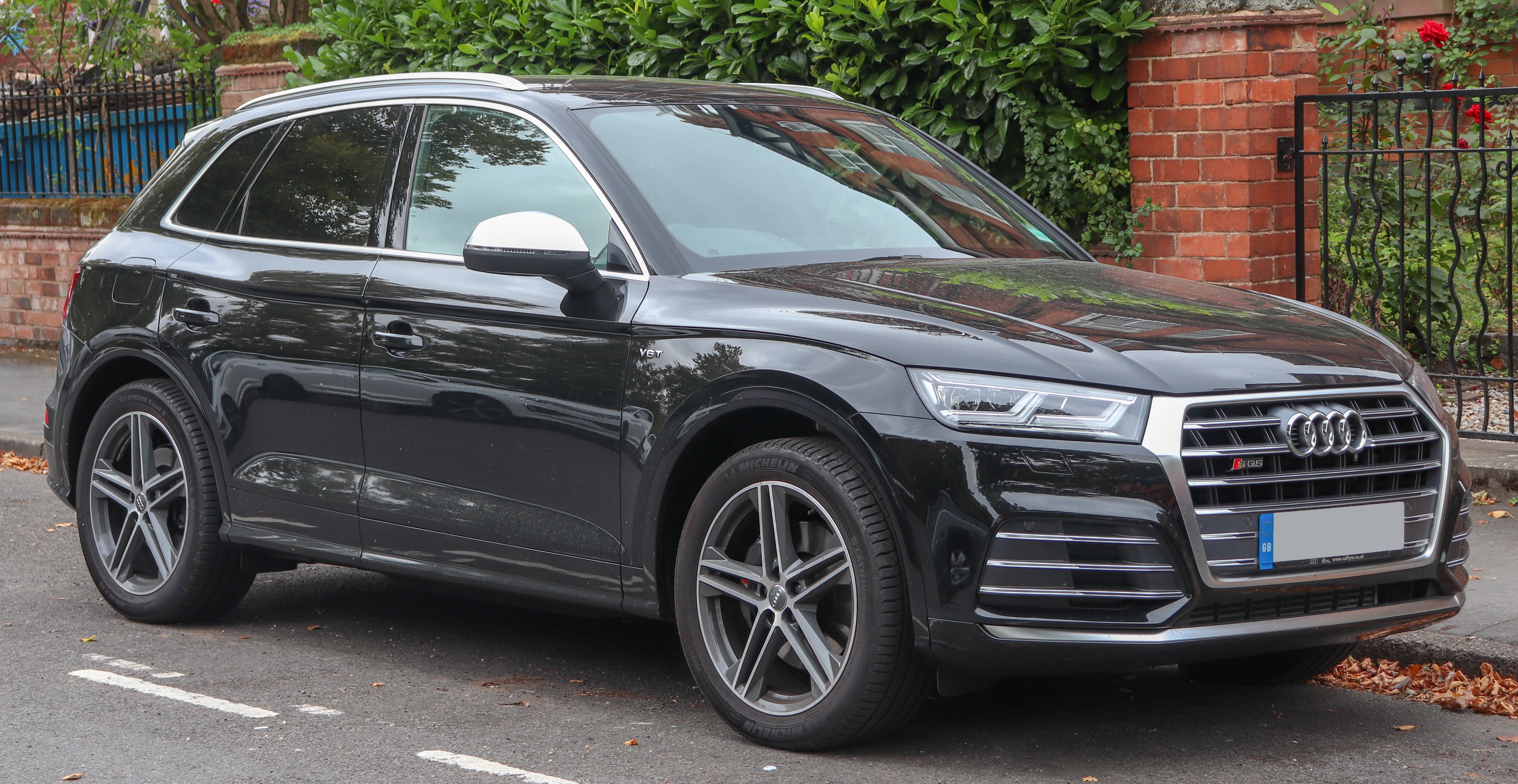
SQ5 TFSi quattro

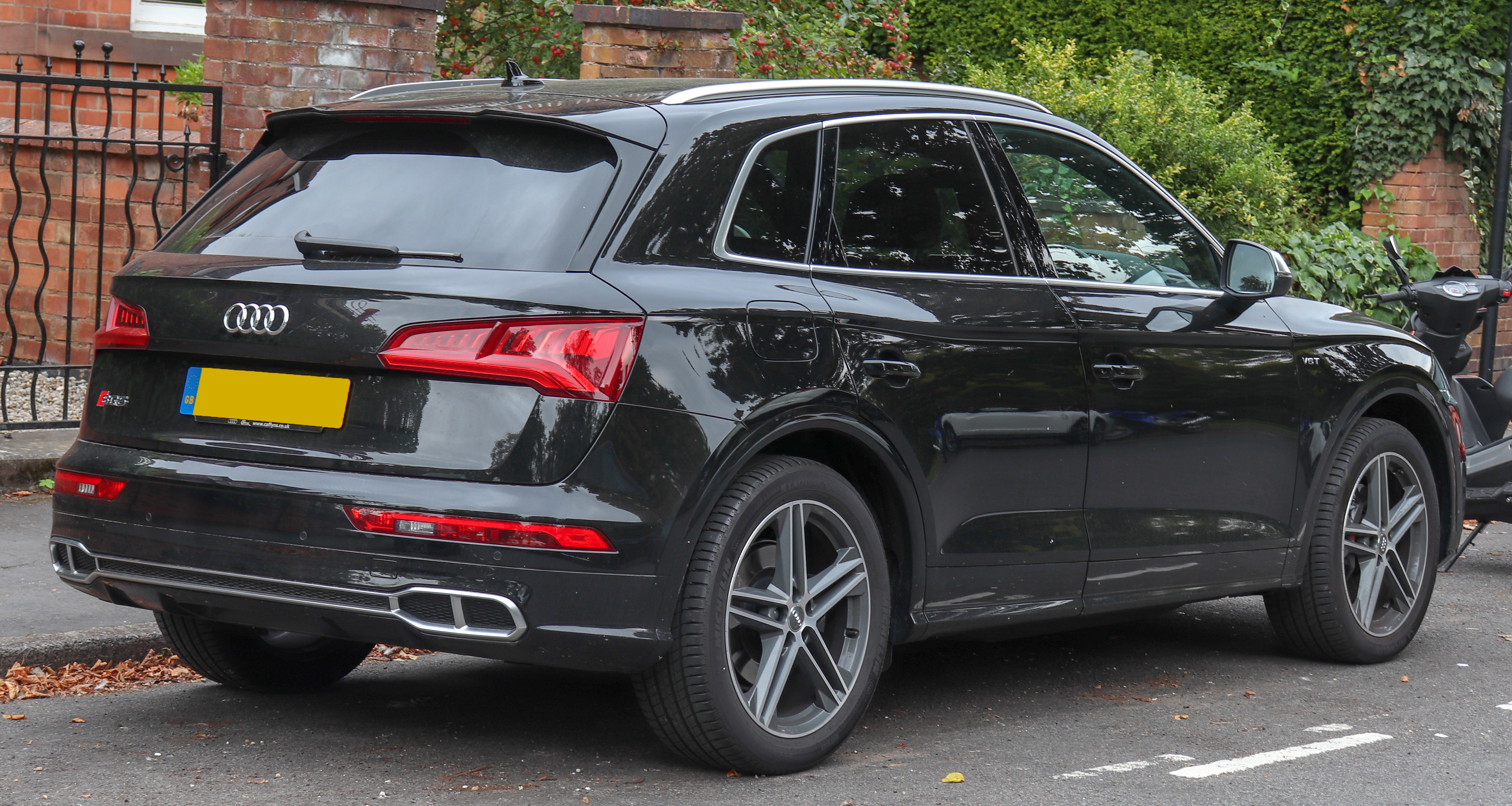
SQ5 TFSi quattro

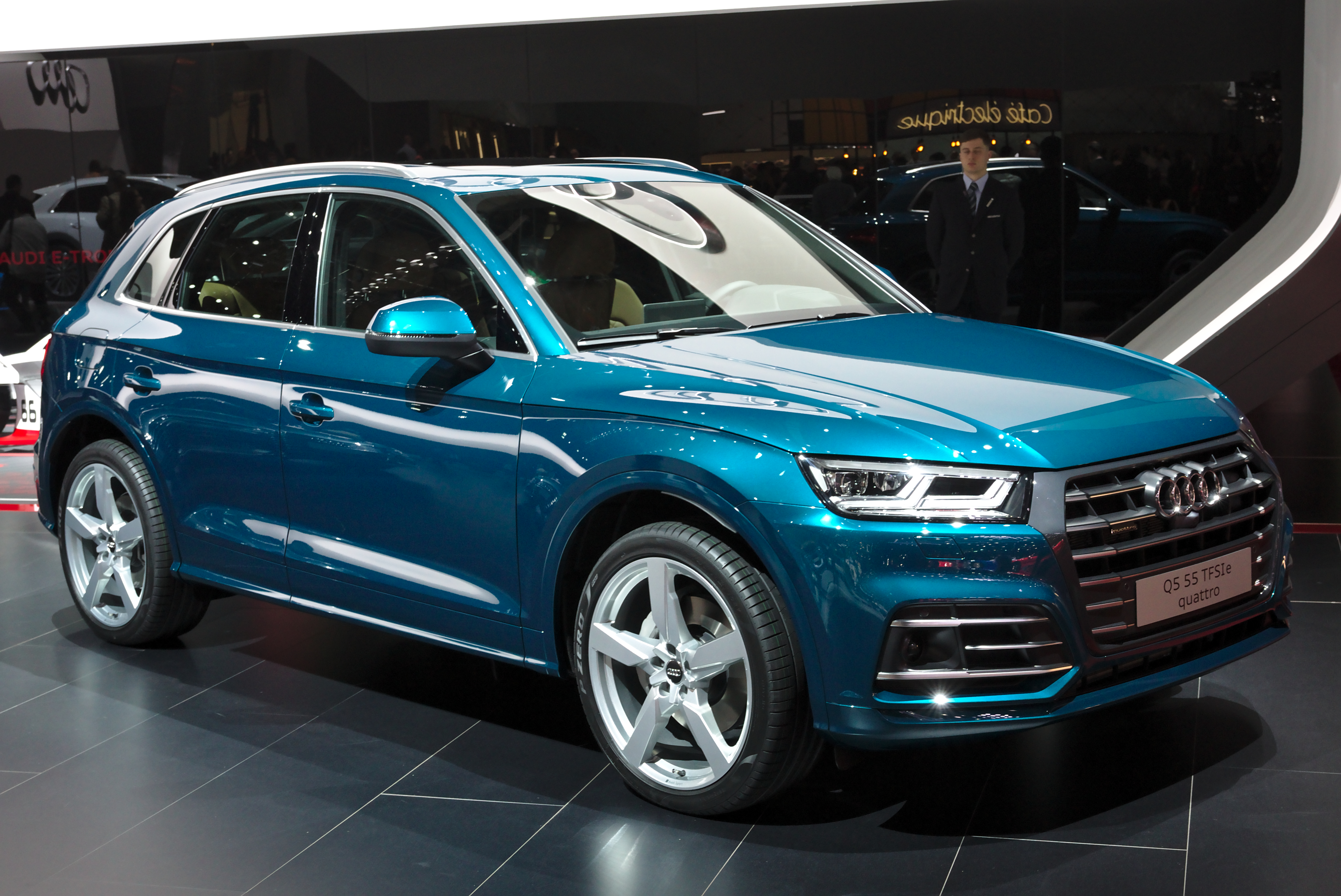
Q5 55 TFSi e quattro

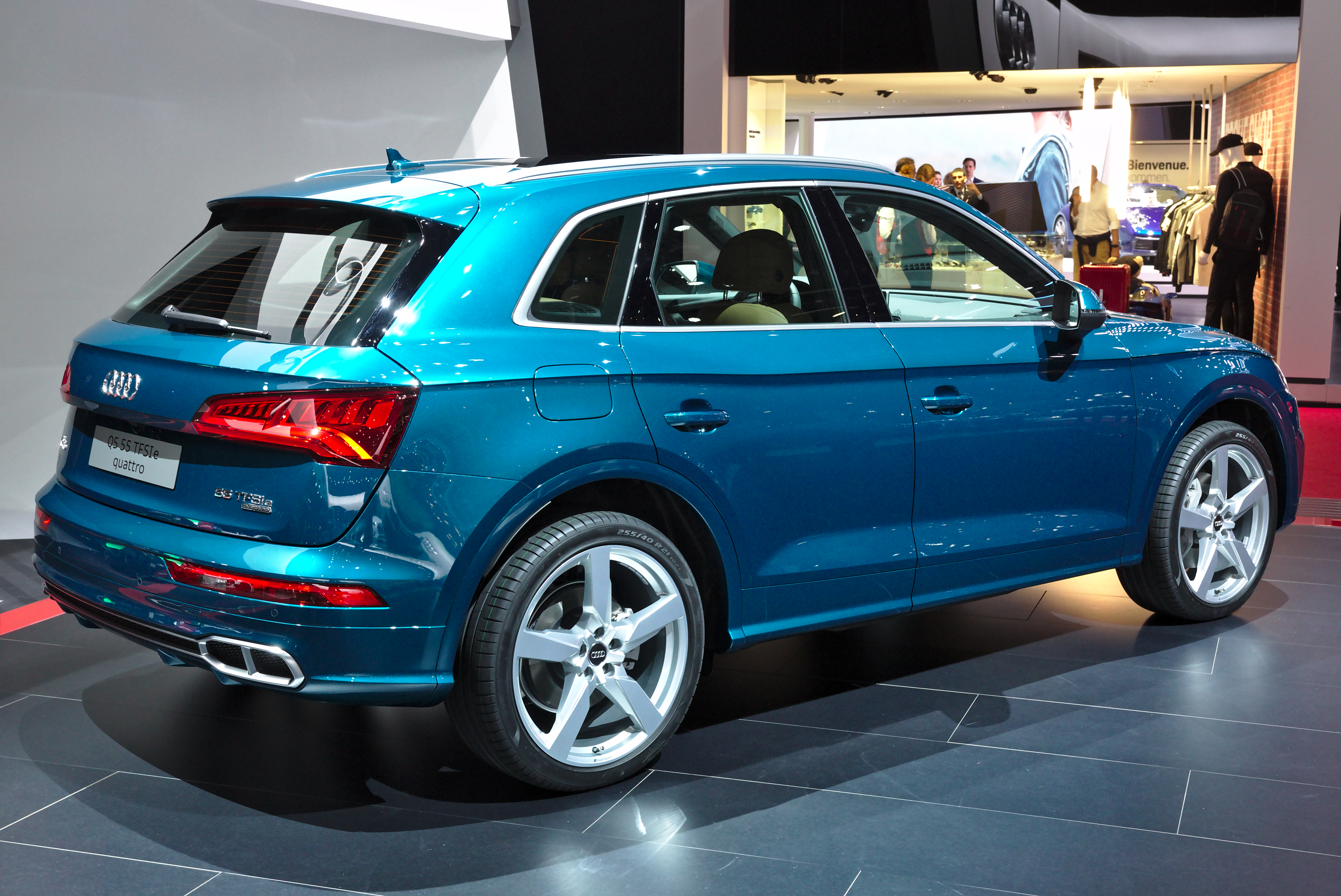
Q5 55 TFSi e quattro

=== 2021 facelift ===
The 2021 Model Year includes the Generation 3 infotainment technologies. This includes a digital marketplace in the myAudi app to add Audi Connect plans and SiriusXM with 360L. Exterior facelift revisions include updates to the grille, bumper side air intakes, side sill, and rear trim. In addition, District Green and Ultra Blue were new paint colors available on the PHEV and SQ5 variants.

The 2021 Q5 was announced at the end of June 2020 and entered production in July with expected first deliveries at the end of 2020. In January 2021, Audi expanded the Q5 lineup by introducing a Sportback variant of the Q5 and SQ5.

The Q5 was launched in India on 23 November 2021 offering two variants - Premium Plus and Technology.

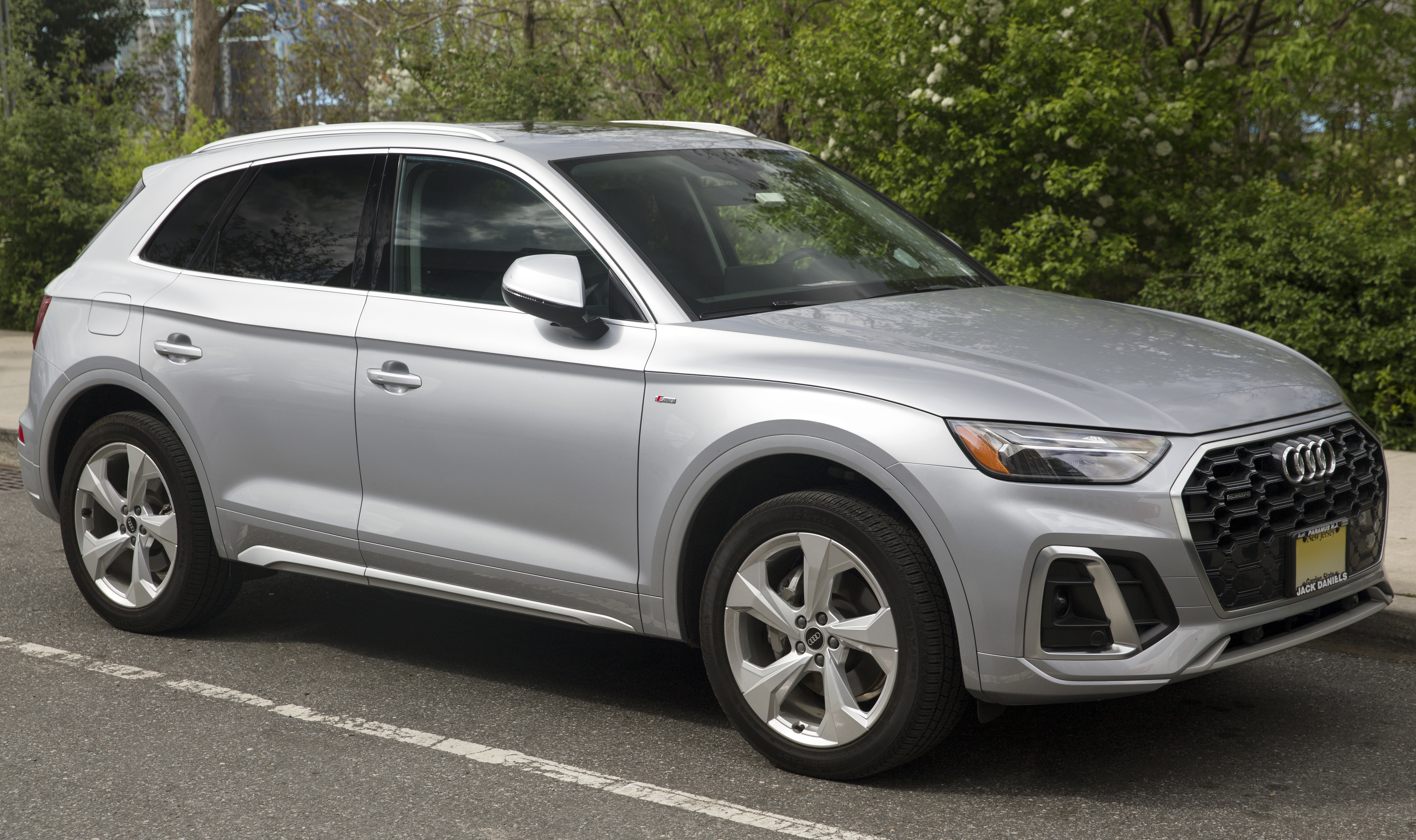
Post-facelift (US)

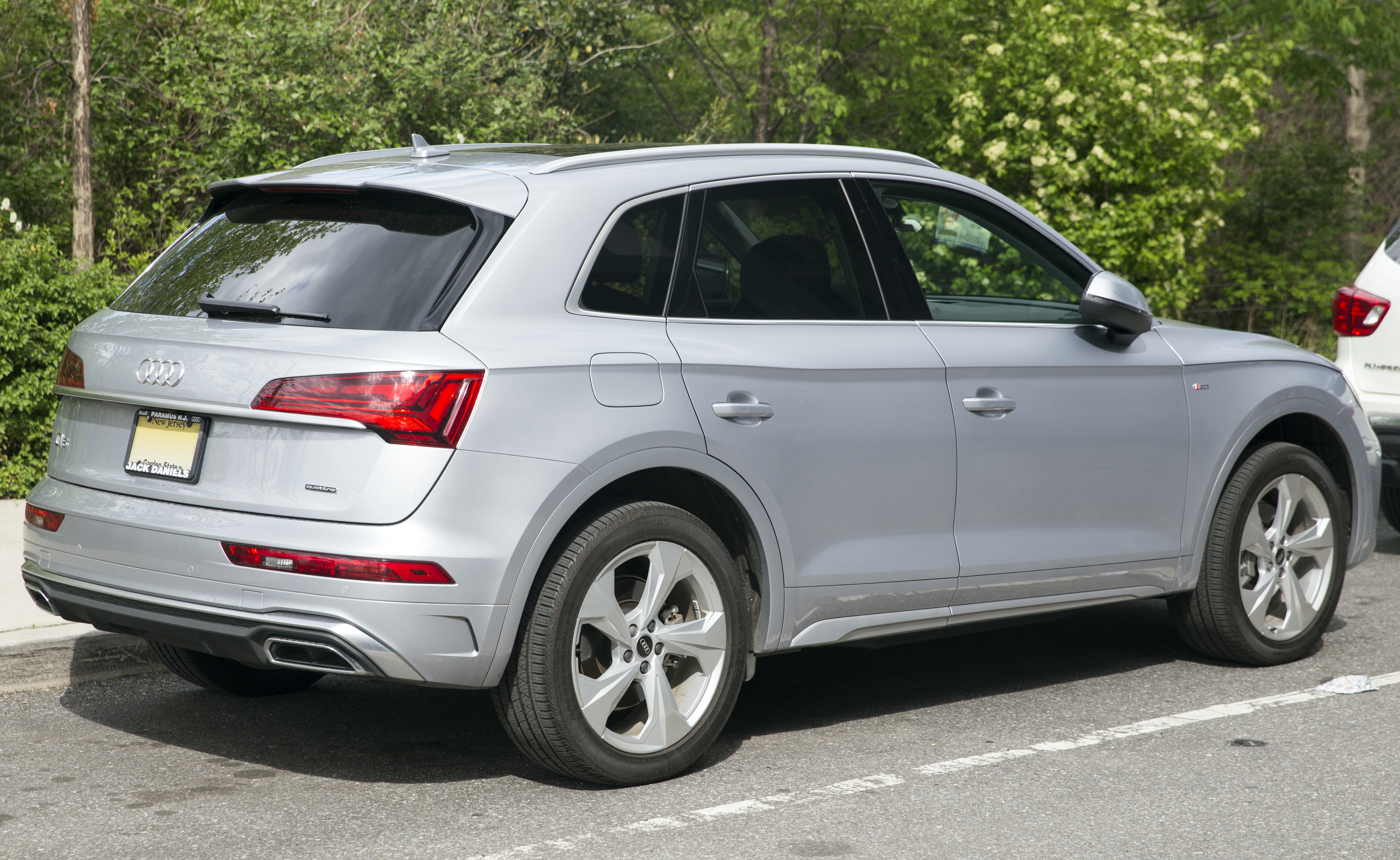
Post-facelift (US)

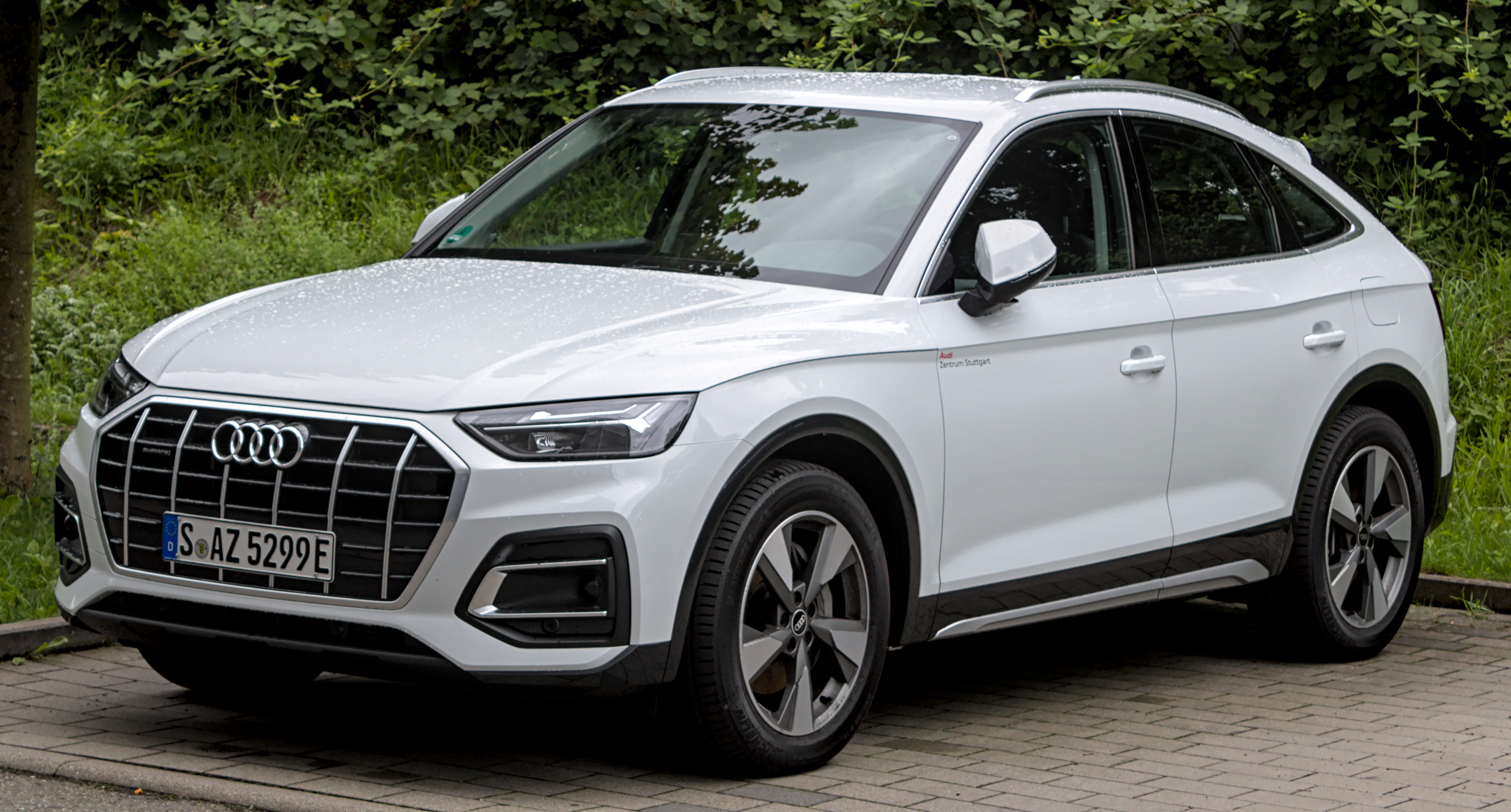
Q5 Sportback (Europe)

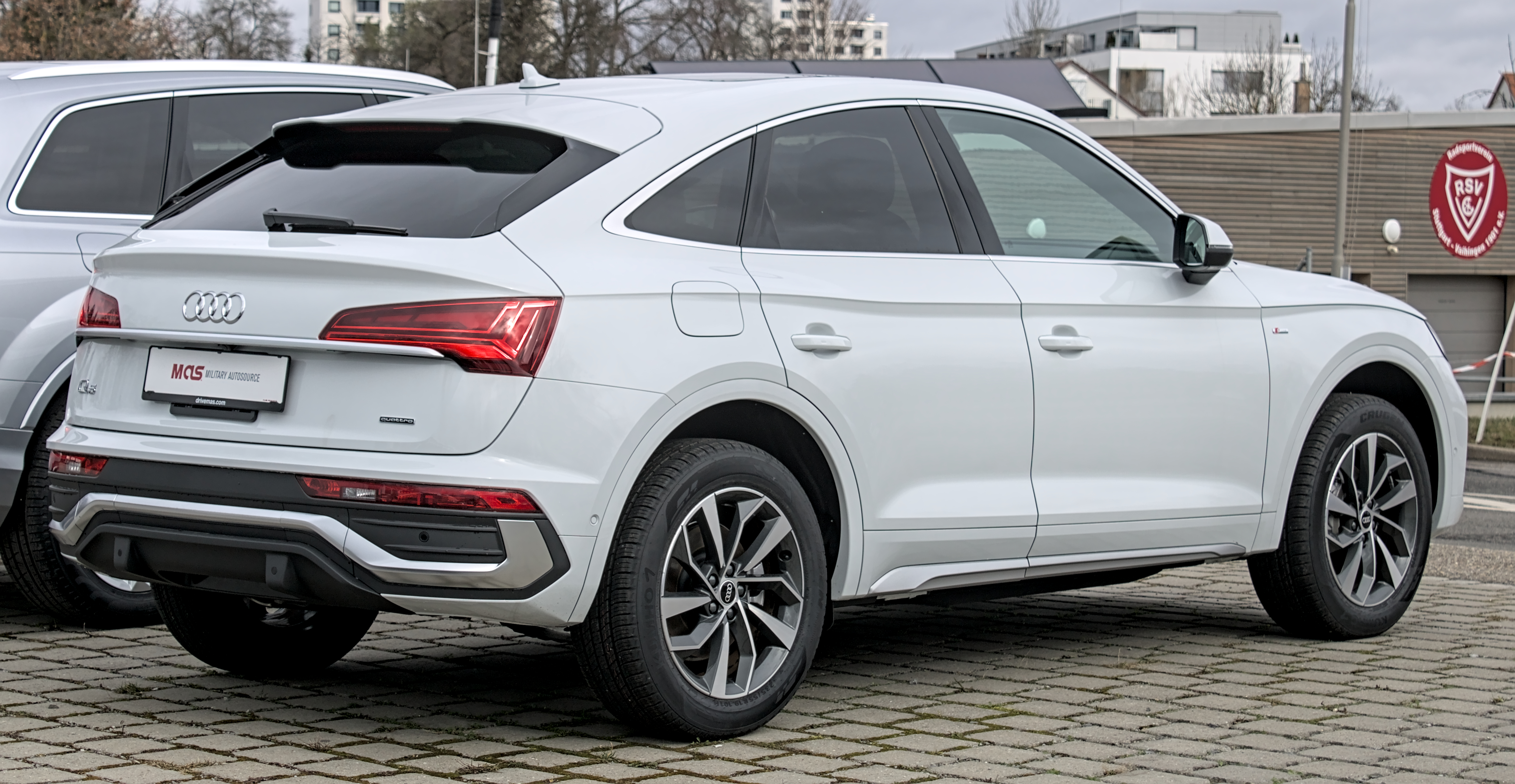
Q5 Sportback (Europe)

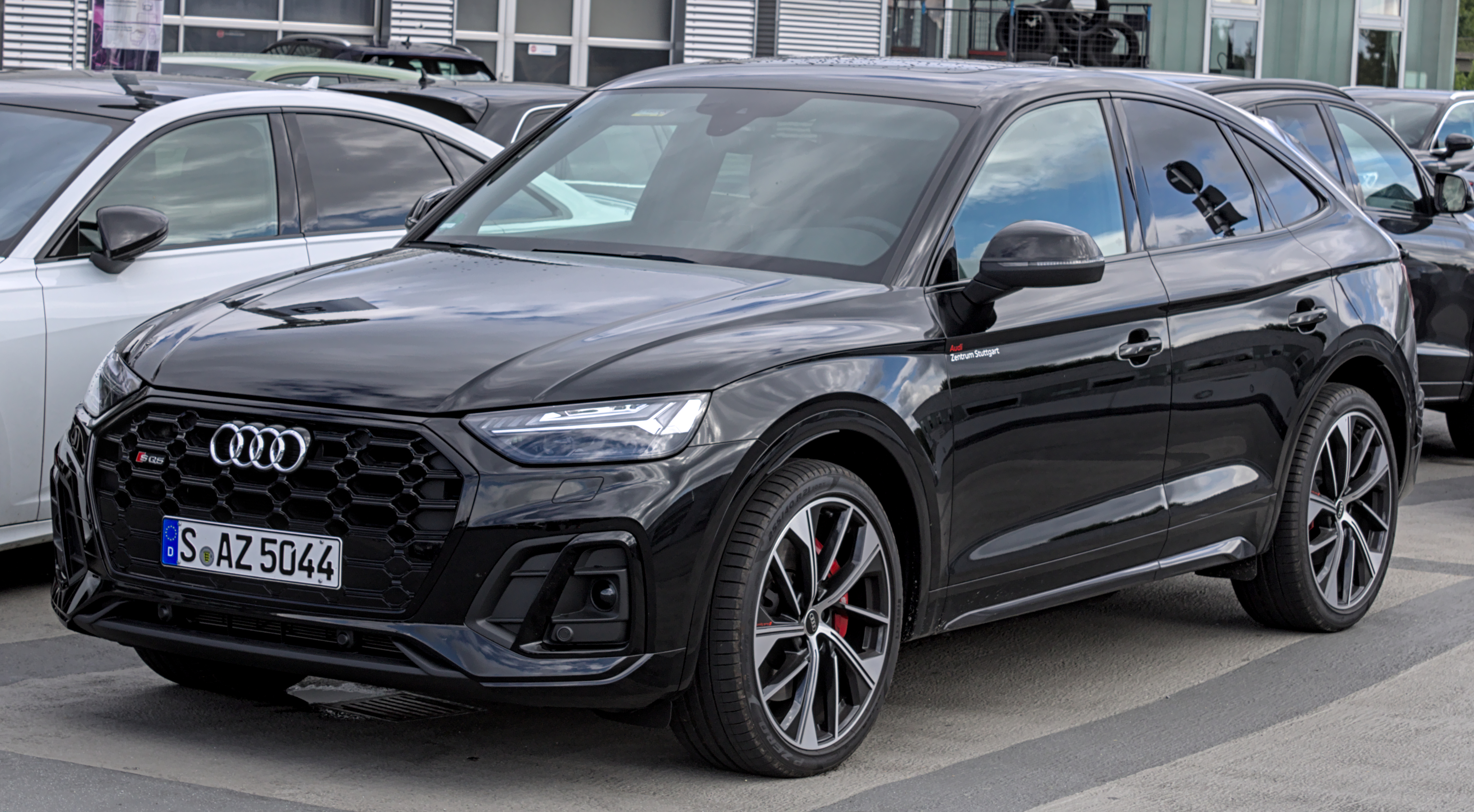
SQ5 Sportback TDI (Europe)

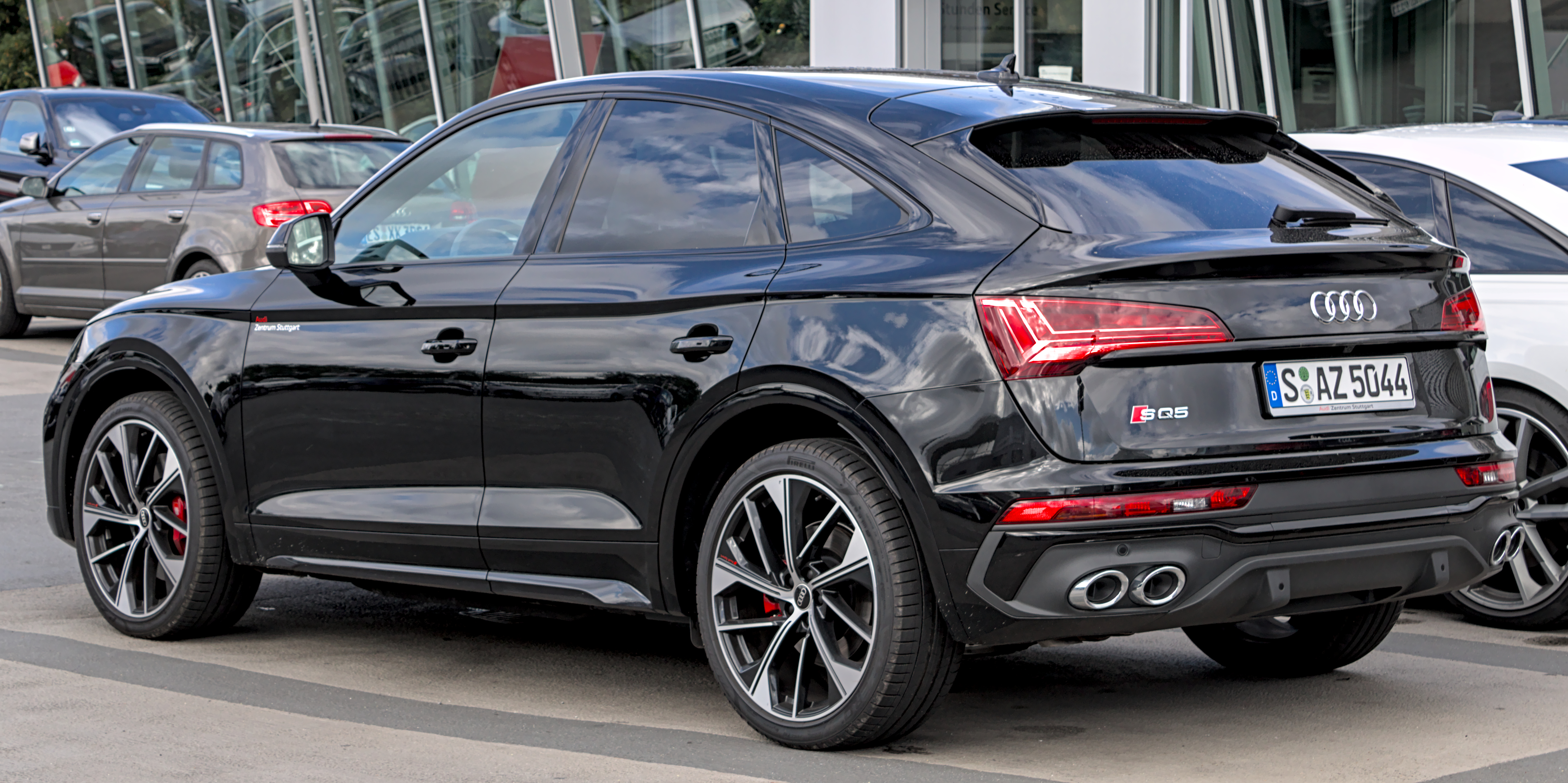
SQ5 Sportback TDI (Europe)

=== Safety ===
==== ANCAP ====
ANCAP test results* Audi Q5 all variants excluding Q5 PHEV (2017)
Test	Score
Overall	5 /5 stars
Frontal offset	
Side impact	
Pole	
Seat belt reminders	
Whiplash protection	
Pedestrian protection	
Electronic stability control	

==== Euro NCAP ====
Euro NCAP test results* Audi Q5 2.0 TDI S tronic (140 kW) (LHD) (2017)
Test	Points	%
Overall:	5 /5 stars	
Adult occupant:	35.7	93%
Child occupant:	42.3	86%
Pedestrian:	31	73%
Safety assist:	7	58%

==== IIHS ====
The 2022 Q5 was awarded the "Top Safety Pick+" by the Insurance Institute for Highway Safety.

IIHS scores
Small overlap front (Driver)	Good	
Small overlap front (Passenger)	Good	
Moderate overlap front	Good	
Side (original test)	Good	
Roof strength	Good	
Head restraints and seats	Good	
Headlights	Good / Acceptable	varies by trim/option
Front crash prevention (Vehicle-to-Vehicle)	Superior	optional
Front crash prevention (Vehicle-to-Vehicle)	Superior	standard
Front crash prevention (Vehicle-to-Pedestrian, day)	Advanced	
Child seat anchors (LATCH) ease of use	Good	

== Third generation (Type GU; 2025) ==
Third generation
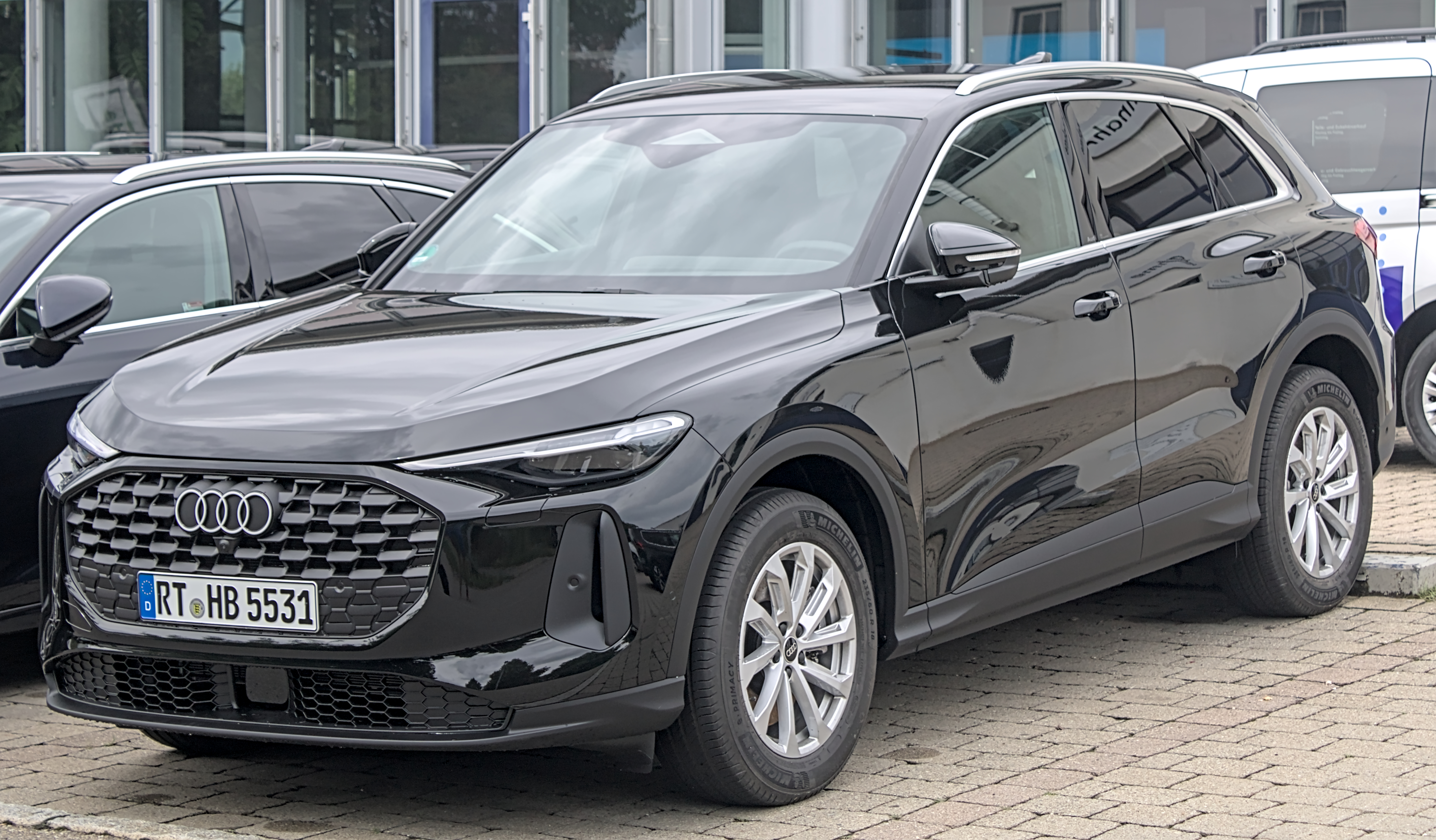

Overview
- Model code: GU
- Production: November 2024–present; April 2025–present (Sportback)
- Model years: 2025–present
- Assembly: Mexico: San José Chiapa (Audi México, S.A. de C.V.); China: Changchun (Q5L, FAW-VW)
- Designer: Marc Lichte

Body and chassis
- Body style: 5-door SUV; 5-door coupé SUV (Sportback)
- Platform: Premium Platform Combustion (PPC)

Powertrain
- Engine: Petrol: 2.0 L TFSI I4; 3.0 L TFSI V6 (SQ5); Diesel: 2.0 L TDI I4
- Electric motor: 48-volt main electrical system (MHEV)
- Transmission: 7-speed S Tronic

Dimensions
- Wheelbase: 2,819 mm (111.0 in); Q5L: 2,945 mm (115.9 in)
- Length: 4,717 mm (185.7 in); Q5L: 4,842 mm (190.6 in)
- Width: 1,900 mm (74.8 in)
- Height: 1,647 mm (64.8 in); Q5L: 1,660 mm (65.4 in)

Audi officially unveiled the third generation of the Q5 SUV on 2 September 2024. The coupé SUV model, marketed as the Sportback, was unveiled on 26 November 2024. Unusually, it was launched in April 2025 as the “All-New” 2025 Audi Q5 alongside the previous generation 2025 model year in North America.

The third-generation Audi Q5 represents the first major redesign since 2018 and is built on Volkswagen Group's new Premium Platform Combustion (PPC) architecture shared with the redesigned Audi A5. The exterior styling features a raked silhouette inspired by the larger Q7, with a specific visual ratio between the greenhouse and body creating a clear SUV shoulder with a clean beltline running from front to rear. New lighting signatures can be customized to eight different patterns for both front and rear, with available IQ.Light LED matrix headlamps providing illumination range up to 500 m (2,000 ft). The redesign marks a departure from the previous generation by eliminating fake exhaust finishers in favor of functional exhaust tips, with dual rectangular outlets on the Q5 and quad tips on the SQ5.

The base Q5 is powered by a 2.0-liter turbocharged inline-four engine producing 268 horsepower and 295 lb-ft of torque, representing a 7-horsepower increase over the previous 45 TFSI powertrain. All Q5 variants feature Audi's new 48-volt Mild Hybrid Plus system producing 18 kW and 230 N⋅m, capable of operating on pure electric power at low speeds. Power is transmitted through a seven-speed dual-clutch automatic transmission with standard all-wheel drive, achieving 0-60 mph acceleration in 5.8 seconds. The performance-oriented SQ5 features a 3.0-liter turbocharged V6 engine generating 362 horsepower and 406 lb-ft of torque, an increase from the previous model's 349 horsepower. Maximum towing capacity for both models is rated at 4,400 lb (2,000 kg), with cargo space of 1,473 L (52.0 cu ft) for the Q5 and 1,388 L (49.0 cu ft)for the SQ5 Sportback.

The interior features an 11.9 in (30 cm) digital instrument cluster and a 14.5 in (37 cm) touchscreen for the infotainment system, with an optional 10.9 in (28 cm) passenger display available on Prestige trim levels. All displays utilize bright panels with quick response times and deep black contrast, though the instrument cluster offers reduced customization compared to the previous generation. Climate controls have been relocated to a dedicated section at the bottom of the center touchscreen, though physical buttons remain absent despite criticism from reviewers. An available Bang & Olufsen audio system features 16 speakers with noise canceling technology, while Dynamic Interaction Light spans the width of the cabin displaying welcome, locking, and turn signal animations. The Q5 Prestige and all SQ5 trim levels come standard with air suspension featuring active adaptive dampers.

Plug-in hybrid e-hybrid variants were revealed in June 2025, featuring the same 2.0-liter turbocharged four-cylinder engine paired with an electric motor and a 25.9 kWh battery pack (20.7 kWh usable). Two power levels are offered: 295 horsepower and 362 horsepower, with the higher output matching the SQ5's power rating. The battery capacity represents a 45 percent increase over the previous generation, providing approximately 62 mi (100 km) of electric range on the WLTP cycle, up from 38 mi (61 km). Base pricing for the 2026 Q5 starts at approximately $54,000, positioning it competitively against rivals such as the BMW X3 and Mercedes-Benz GLC.

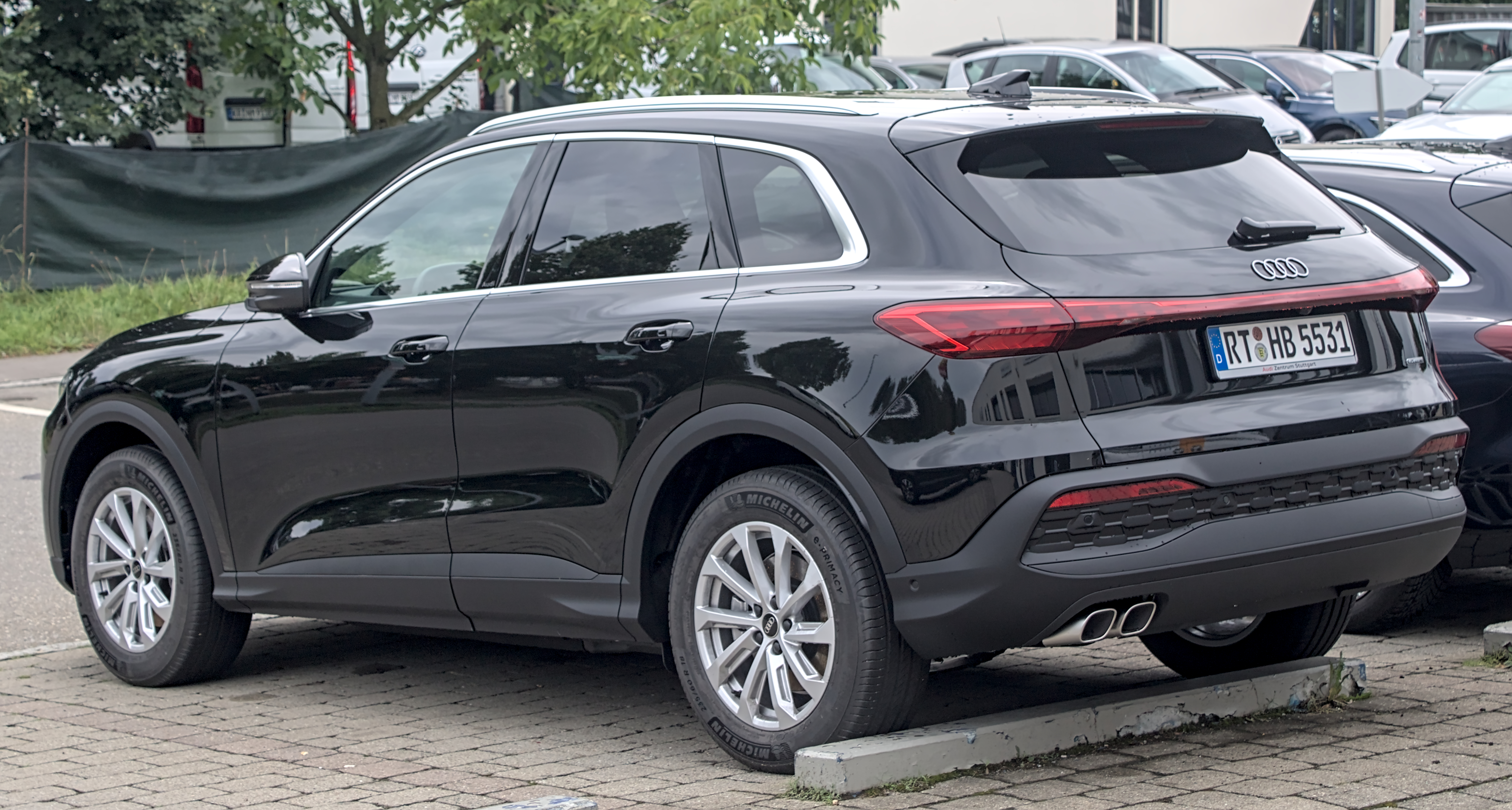
Rear

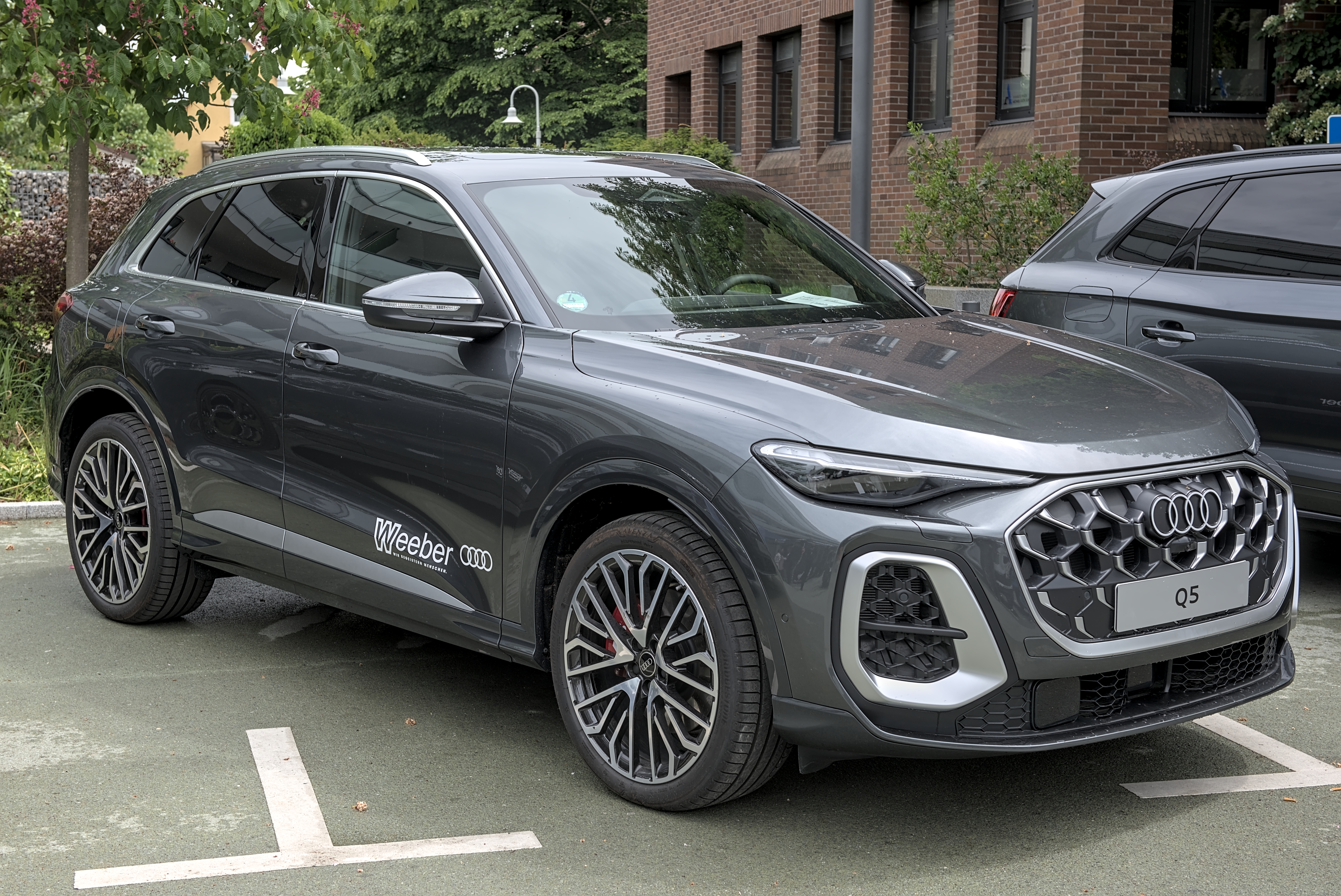
Audi SQ5

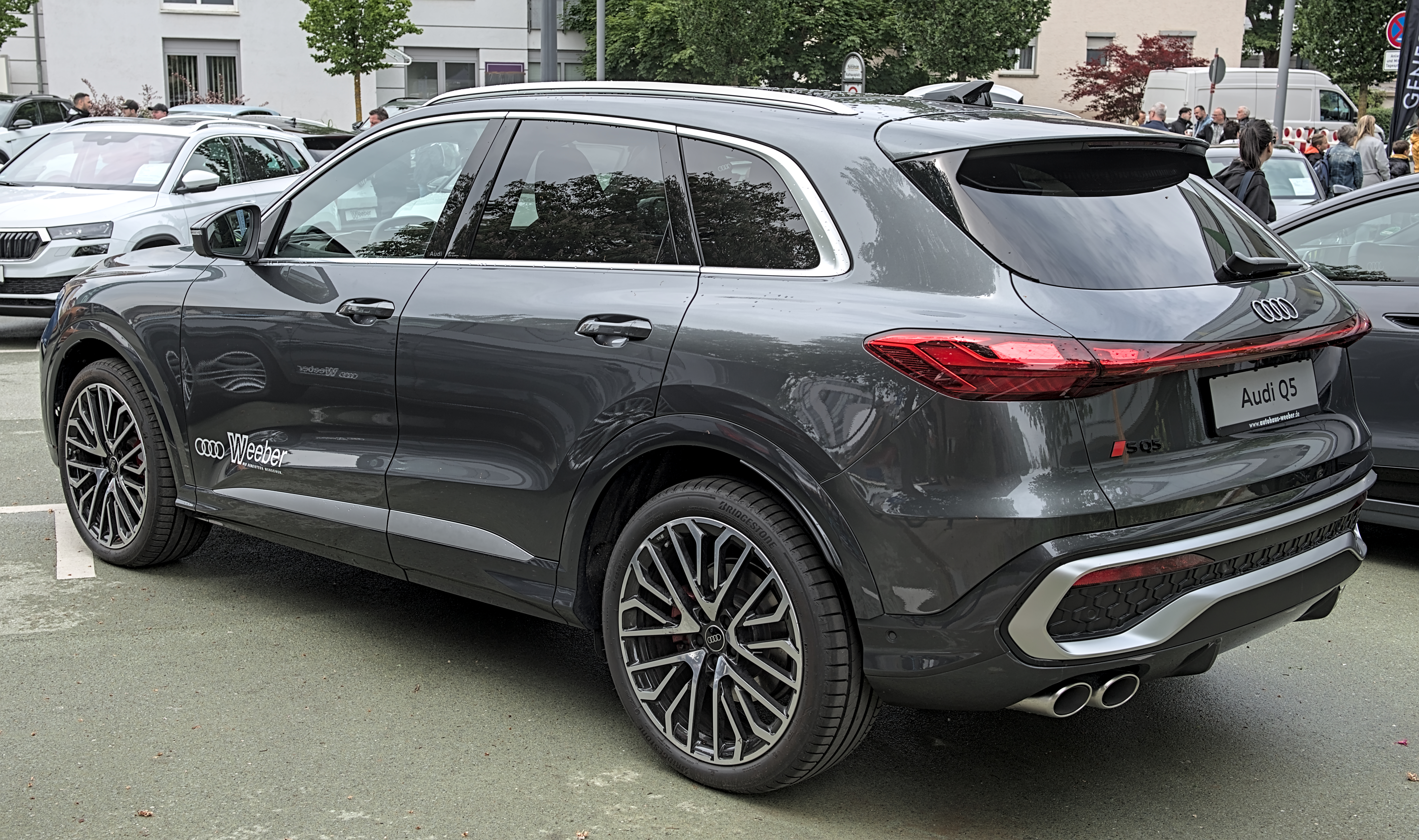
Rear

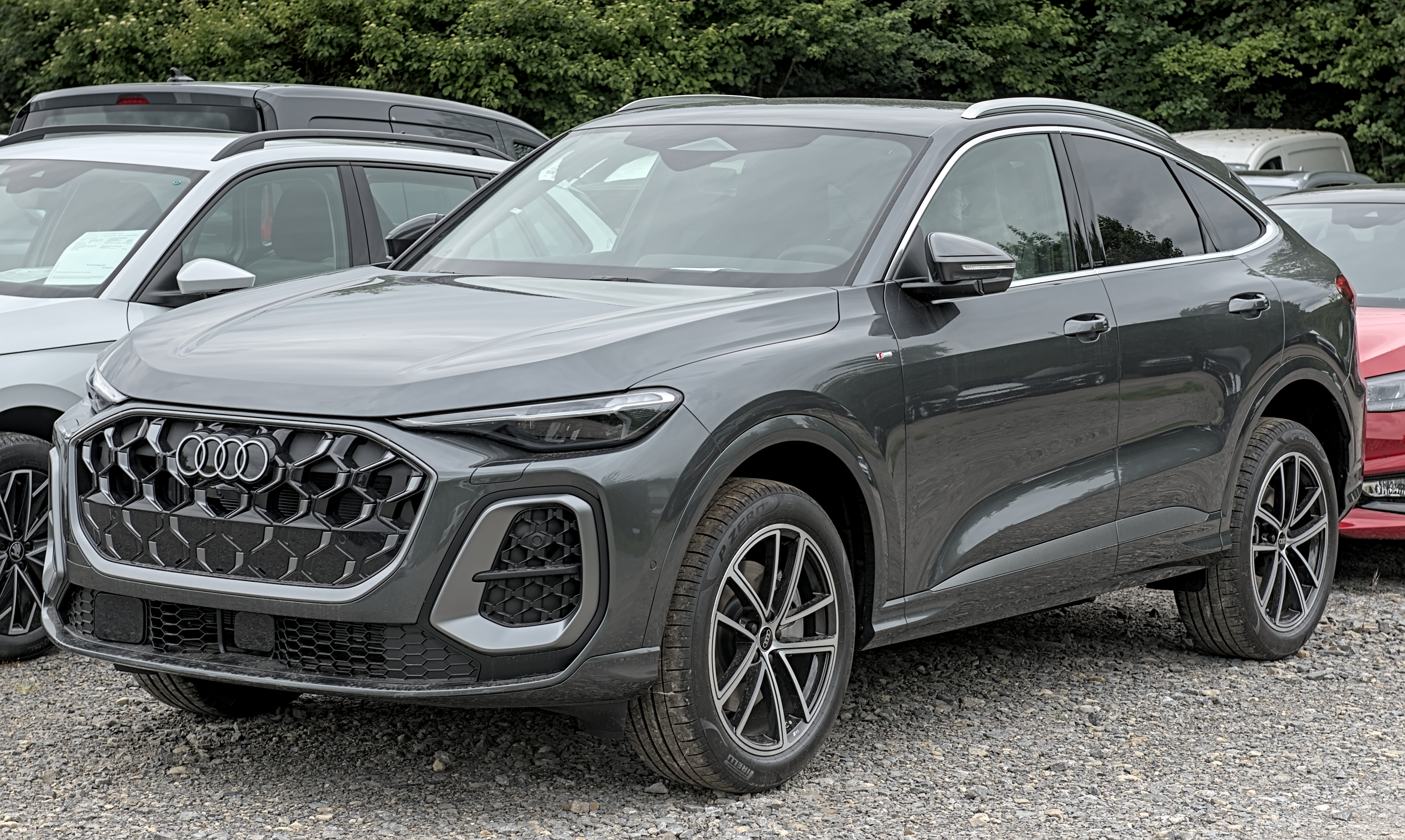
Audi Q5 Sportback

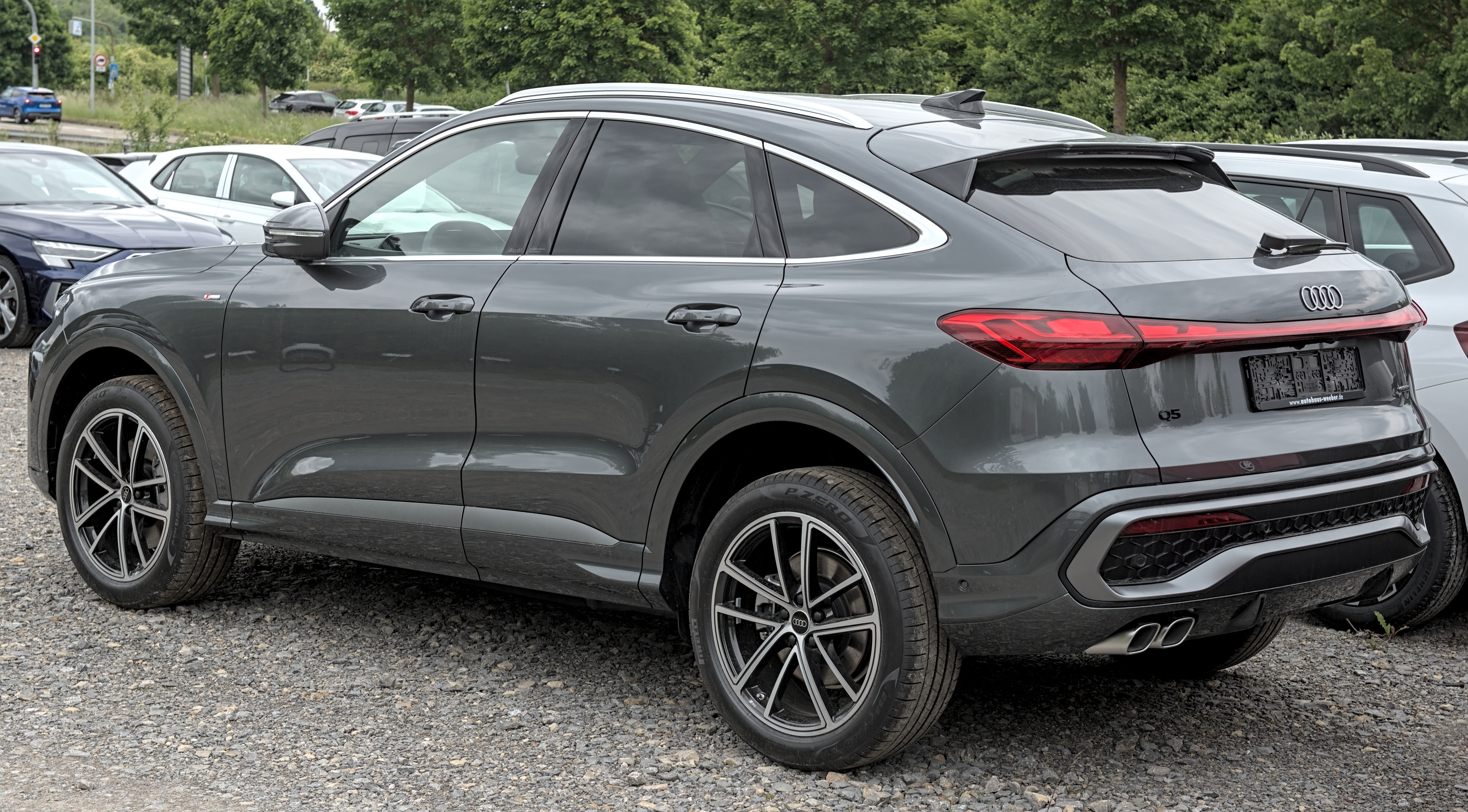
Rear

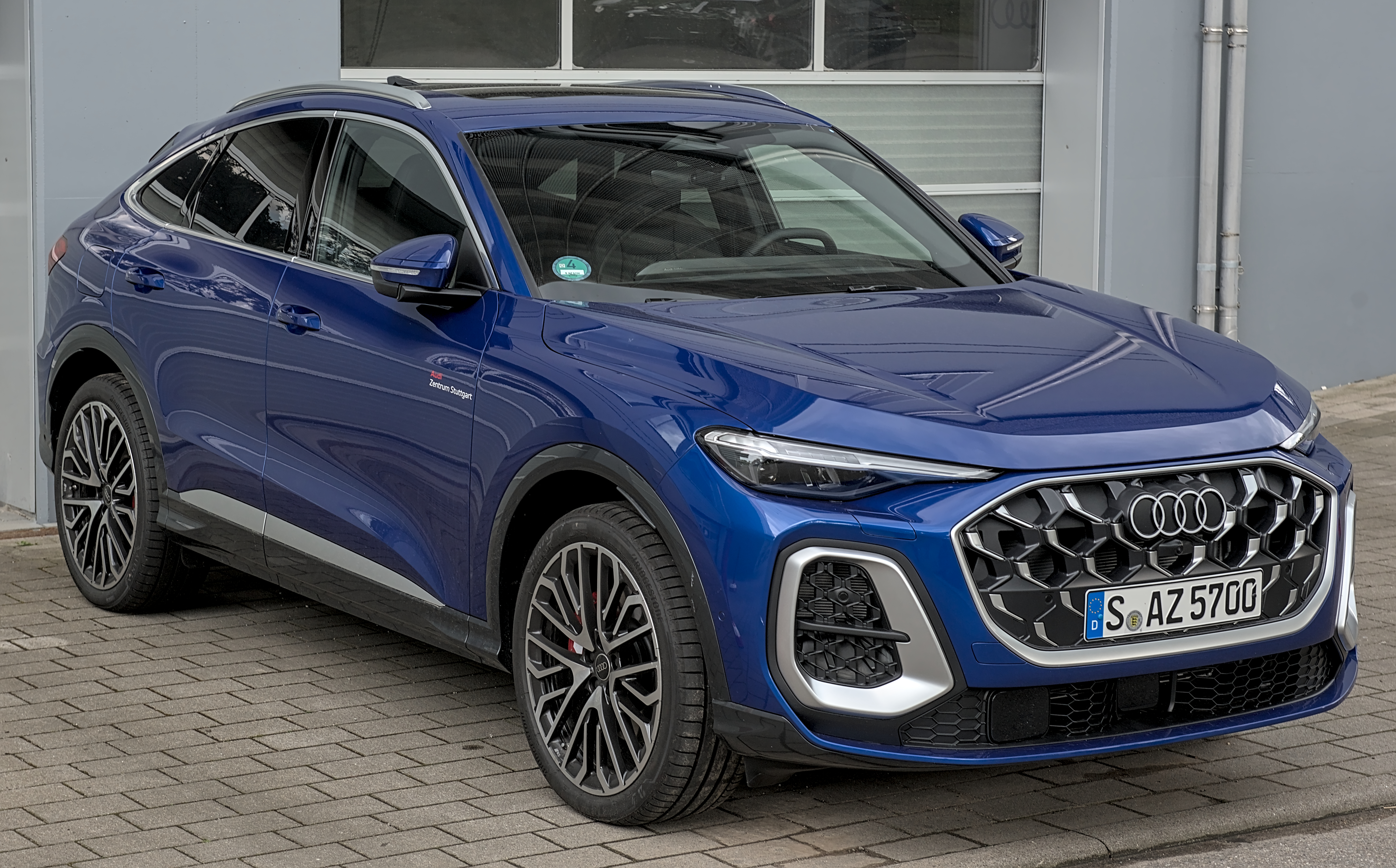
Audi SQ5 Sportback

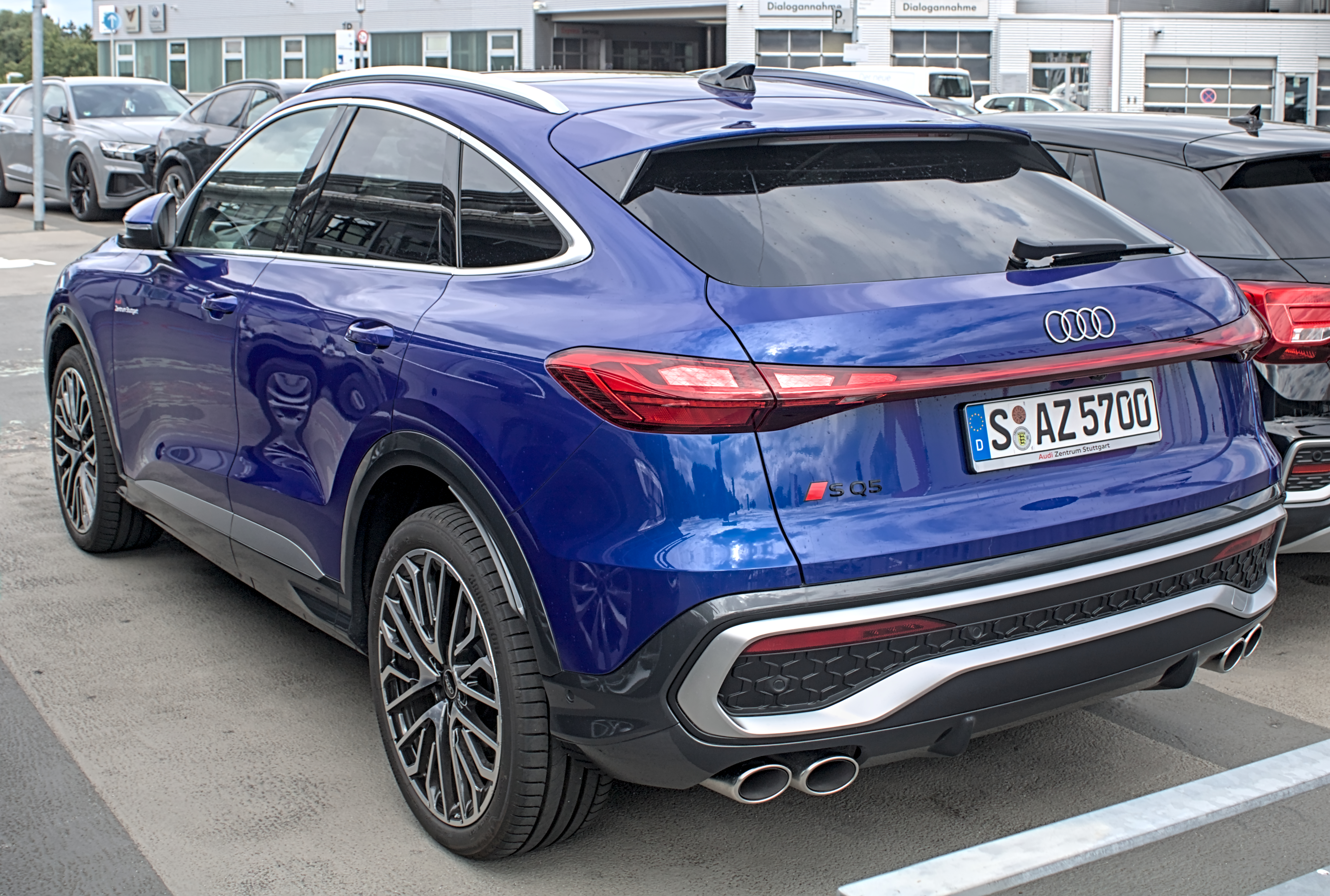
Rear

=== Q5L ===
The Q5L was released on 23 April 2025 by FAW-Audi at Auto Shanghai 2025, with preorders opening on 22 December 2025 and went on sale on 15 January 2026. has a height of 1,660 mm (65 in), length of 4,842 mm (190.6 in), and wheelbase of 2,945 mm (115.9 in).

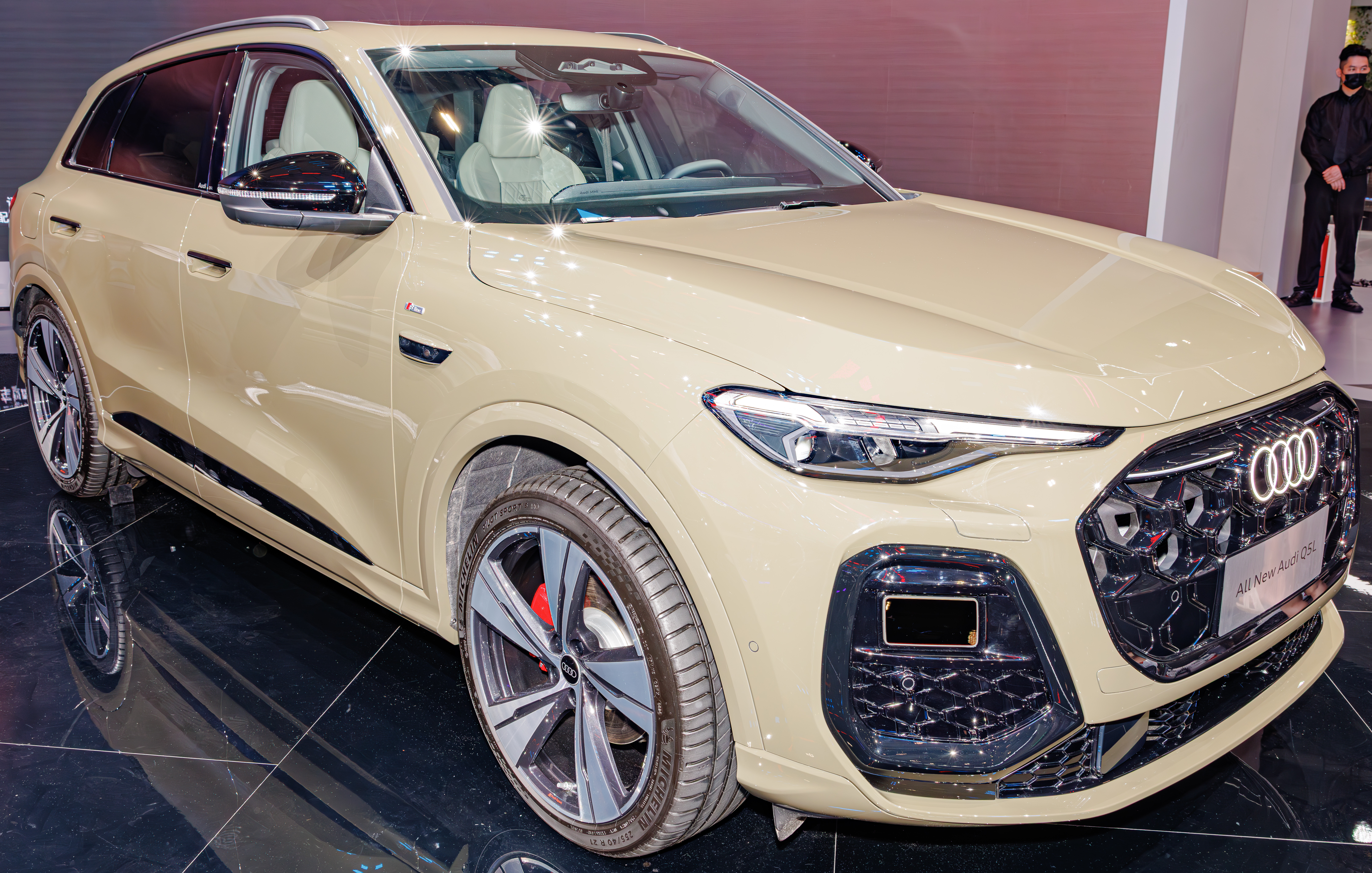
Audi Q5L

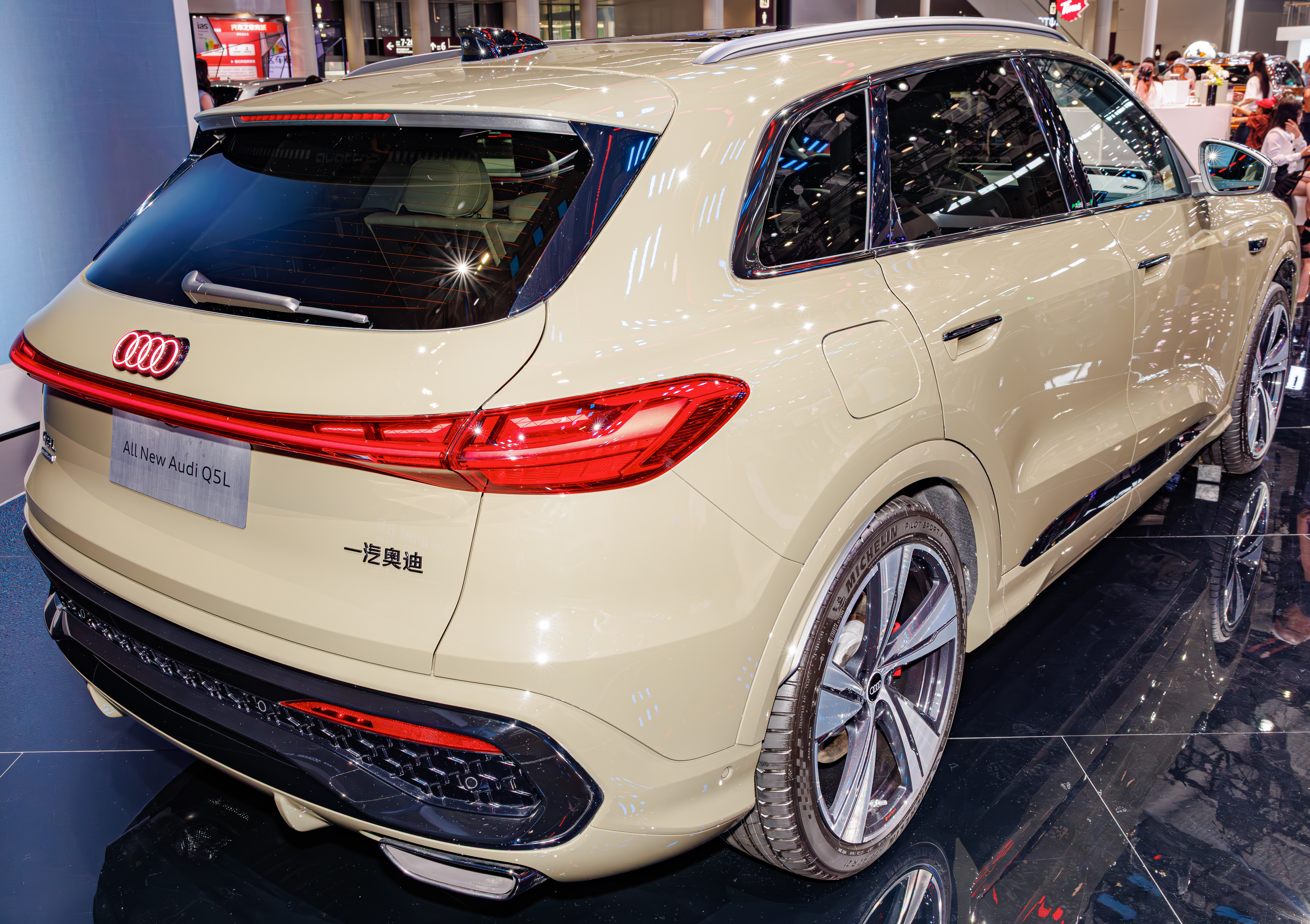
Rear view

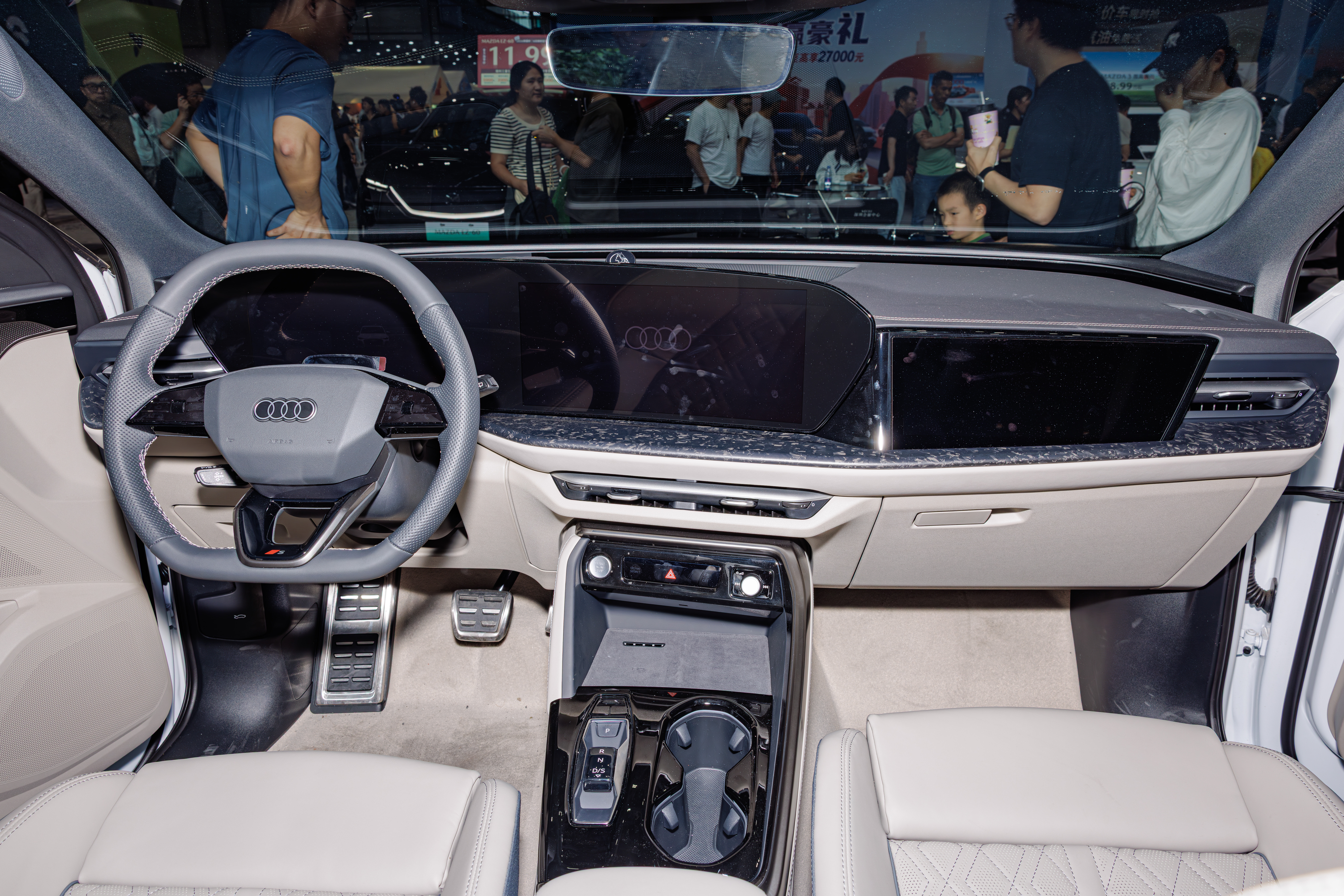
Interior

=== Powertrains ===
Petrol engines
Model	Codename	Engine	Power	Torque	Top speed	0–100 km/h (0–62 mph)
2.0 TFSI	VW EA888	2.0 L (1,984 cc)	272 PS (200 kW; 268 hp)	400 N⋅m (295 lb⋅ft)	226 km/h (140 mph)	8.6 s
2.0 TFSI quattro	VW EA888	2.0 L (1,984 cc)	272 PS (200 kW; 268 hp)	400 N⋅m (295 lb⋅ft)	226 km/h (140 mph)	7.2 s
SQ5 3.0 V6 TFSI	VW EA839	3.0 L (2,995 cc)	367 PS (270 kW; 362 hp)	550 N⋅m (406 lb⋅ft)	250 km/h (155 mph)	4.5 s
Diesel engines
2.0 TDI quattro	VW EA288	2.0 L (1,986 cc)	204 PS (150 kW; 201 hp)	400 N⋅m (295 lb⋅ft)	226 km/h (140 mph)	7.4 s

=== Safety ===
ANCAP test results* Audi Q5 all variants (2017)
Test	Score
Overall	5 /5 stars
Frontal offset	
Side impact	
Pole	
Seat belt reminders	
Whiplash protection	
Pedestrian protection	
Electronic stability control	

Euro NCAP test results Audi Q5 R4 2.0 TDI MHEV 4x4 (LHD) (2025)
Test	Points	%
Overall:	5 /5 stars	
Adult occupant:	32.4	85%
Child occupant:	42.3	86%
Pedestrian:	50.3	79%
Safety assist:	14	77%

== Production and sales ==
Production
Year	Units
2007	162
2008	20,324
2009	109,117
2010	155,052
2011	183,768
2012	209,799
2013	231,466
2014	260,832
2015	267,651
2016	297,750
2017	289,892
2018	298,793
2019	286,365
2020	276,015
2021	279,712
2022	319,162
2023	334,480
2024	298,000

Sales
Year	China				US
Year	Q5L	Sportback	SQ5	Total	US
2023	130,307	13,097	701	144,105	74,145
2024	153,975	2,730	418	157,123	56,799
2025	130,084	4,319	227	134,630	46,215

== See also ==
- List of fuel cell vehicles
- Audi Q5 e-tron
- Audi Q4 e-tron
