= Multi Media Interface =

Audi in-car entertainment system

The Multi Media Interface (MMI) system is an in-car user interface media system developed by Audi, and was launched at the 2001 Frankfurt Motor Show on the Audi-Avantissimo concept car. Production MMI was introduced in the second generation Audi A8 D3 in late 2002 and implemented in majority of its latest series of automobiles.

== Concept ==
MMI consists of a single integrated interface, which controls a variety of devices and functions of the car. The system consists of the MMI terminal and the MMI display screen.

The central element of the MMI terminal is the control dial. This dial can be rotated to navigate up and down through menus, and pressed to activate a selected function. Starting with the MMI 3G system, an integrated joystick in the main control dial can be used to (for example) navigate the map. Depending on the MMI generation and configuration, four to eight function buttons surround the control dial, which launch the various features. The MMI screen is a five-inch monochrome black-and-red or seven-inch 16:9 full-color display, depending on the variation of MMI fitted in the car. MMI uses Media Oriented Systems Transport (MOST) technology to interconnect the various systems. Harman Becker Automotive Systems manufactures the MMI system, utilizing QNX Neutrino's Real Time Operating System (RTOS) software.

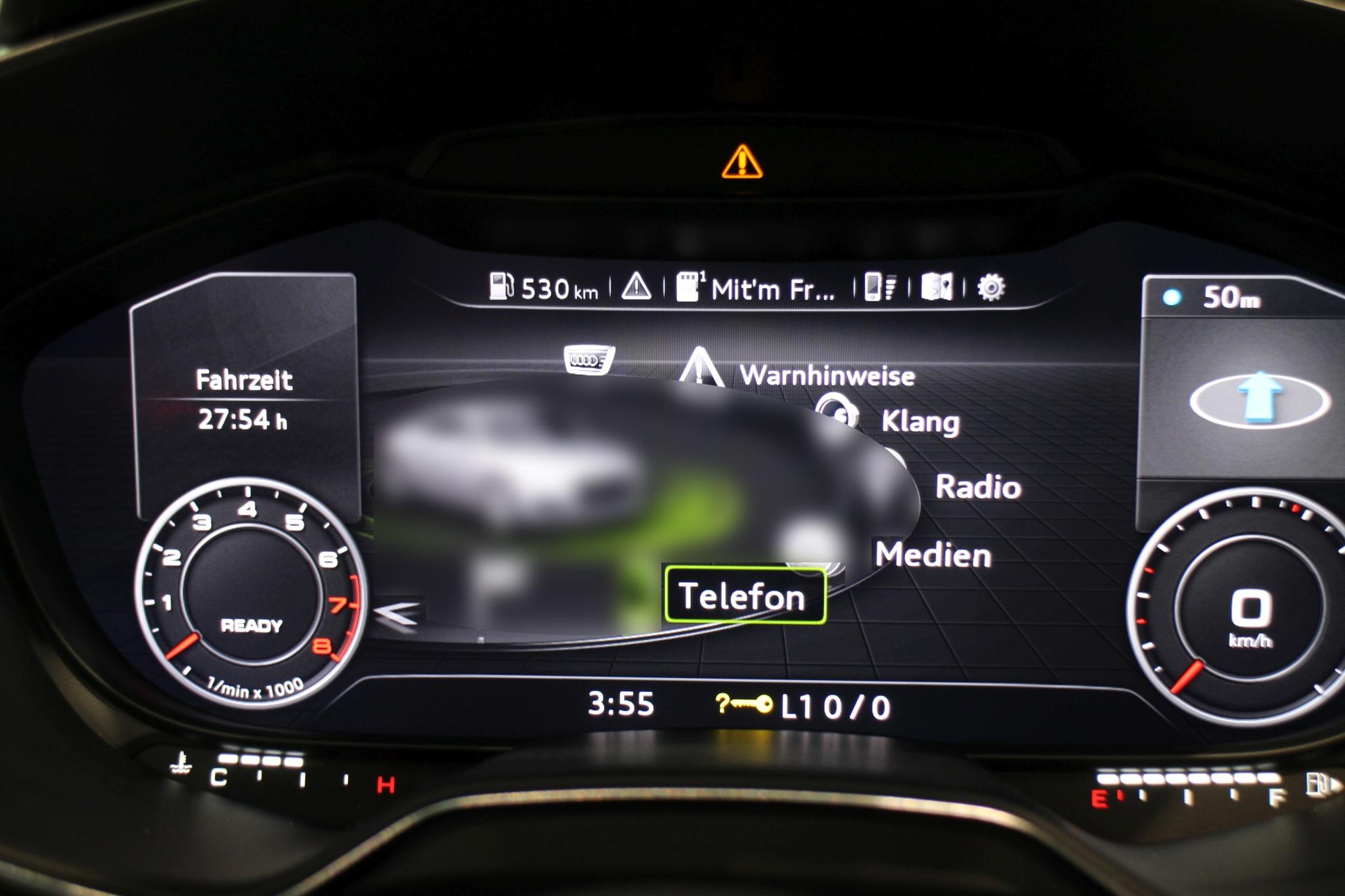
MMI-Menu on Audi virtual cockpit, Audi TT 8S

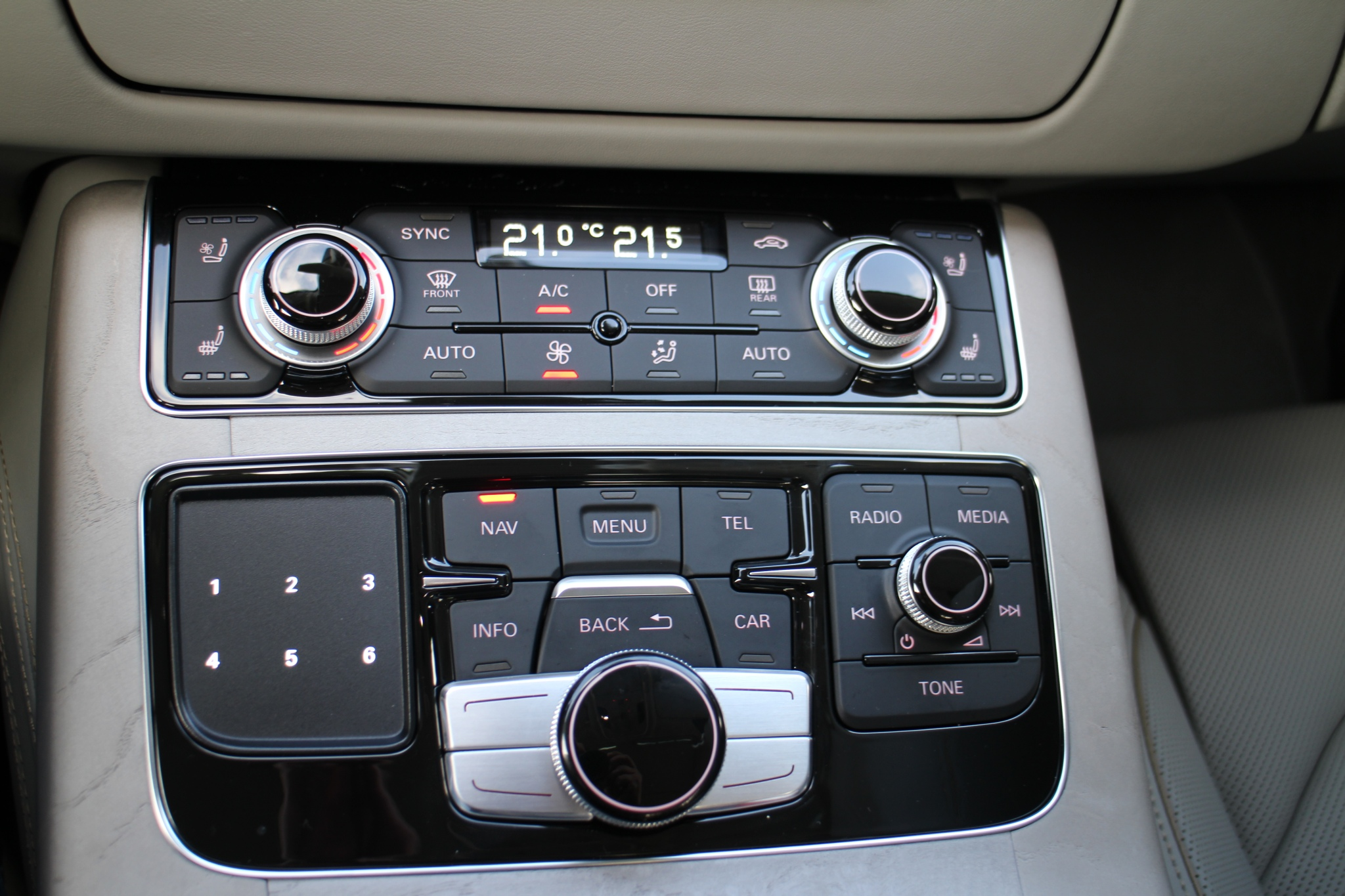
A left-hand drive 2014 Audi A8 (D4), showing the MMI controls

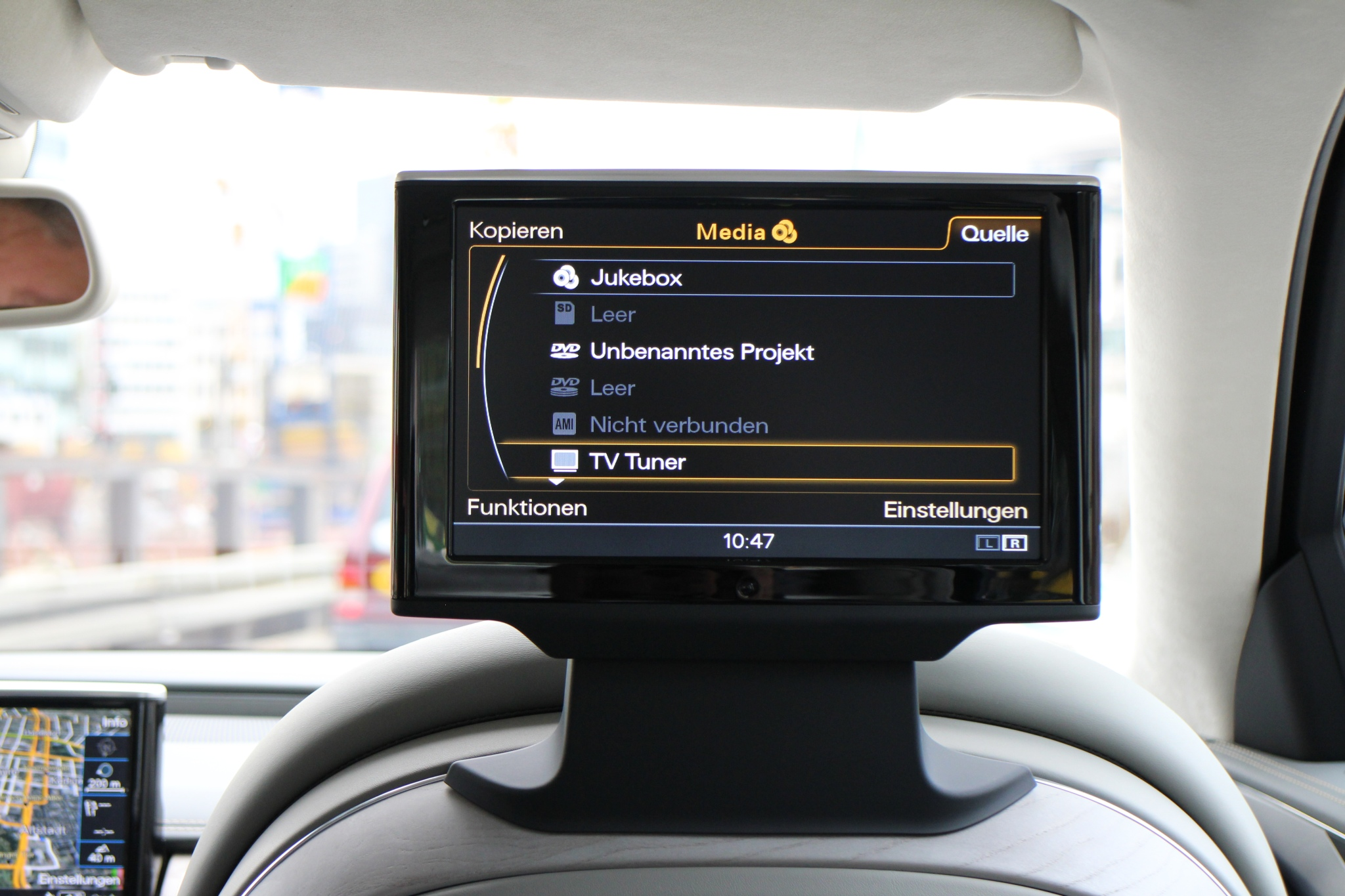
MMI interface, music section, display integrated in front right side seat, view from rear seat, 2014 Audi A8

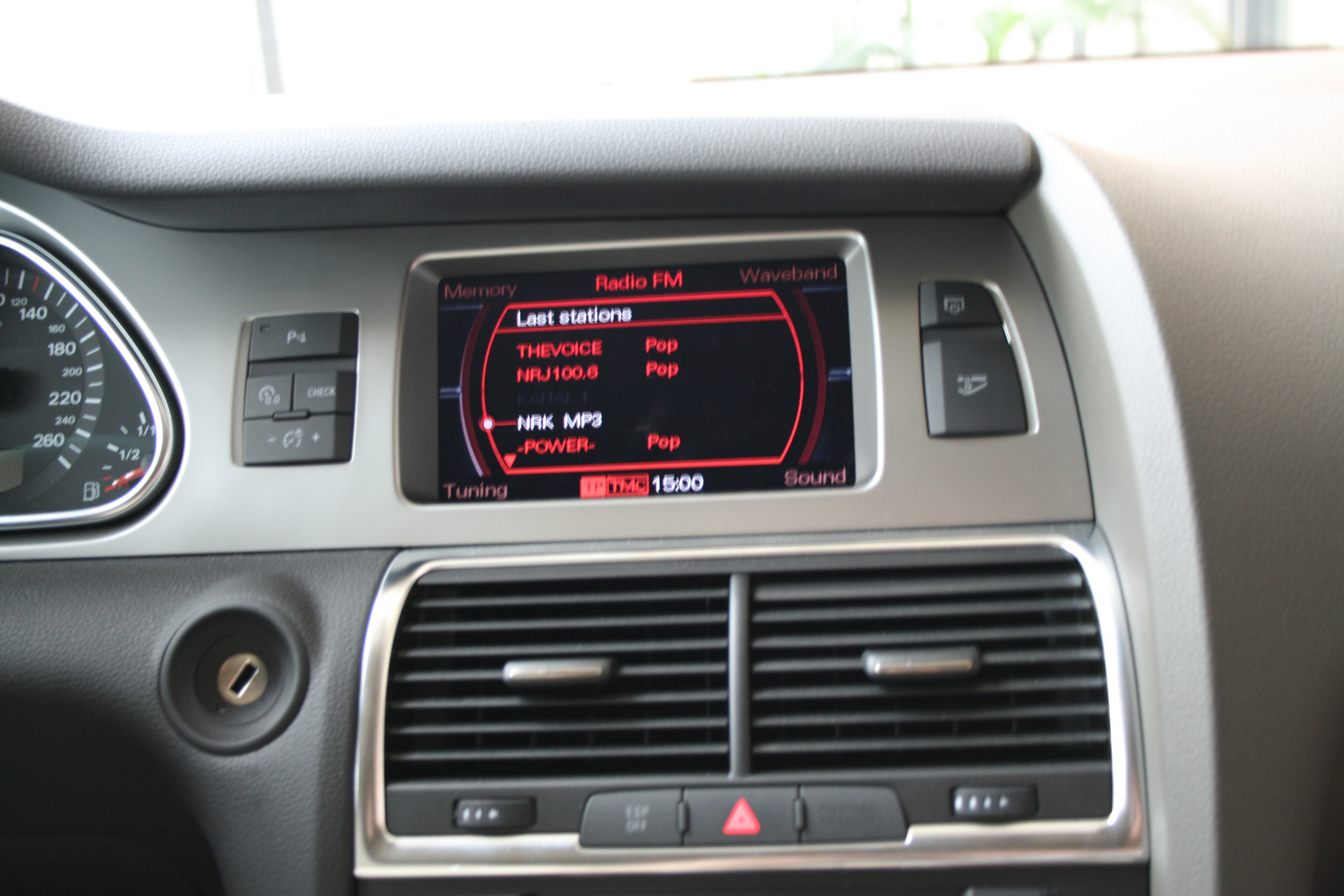
Older generation MMI menu on Audi Q7

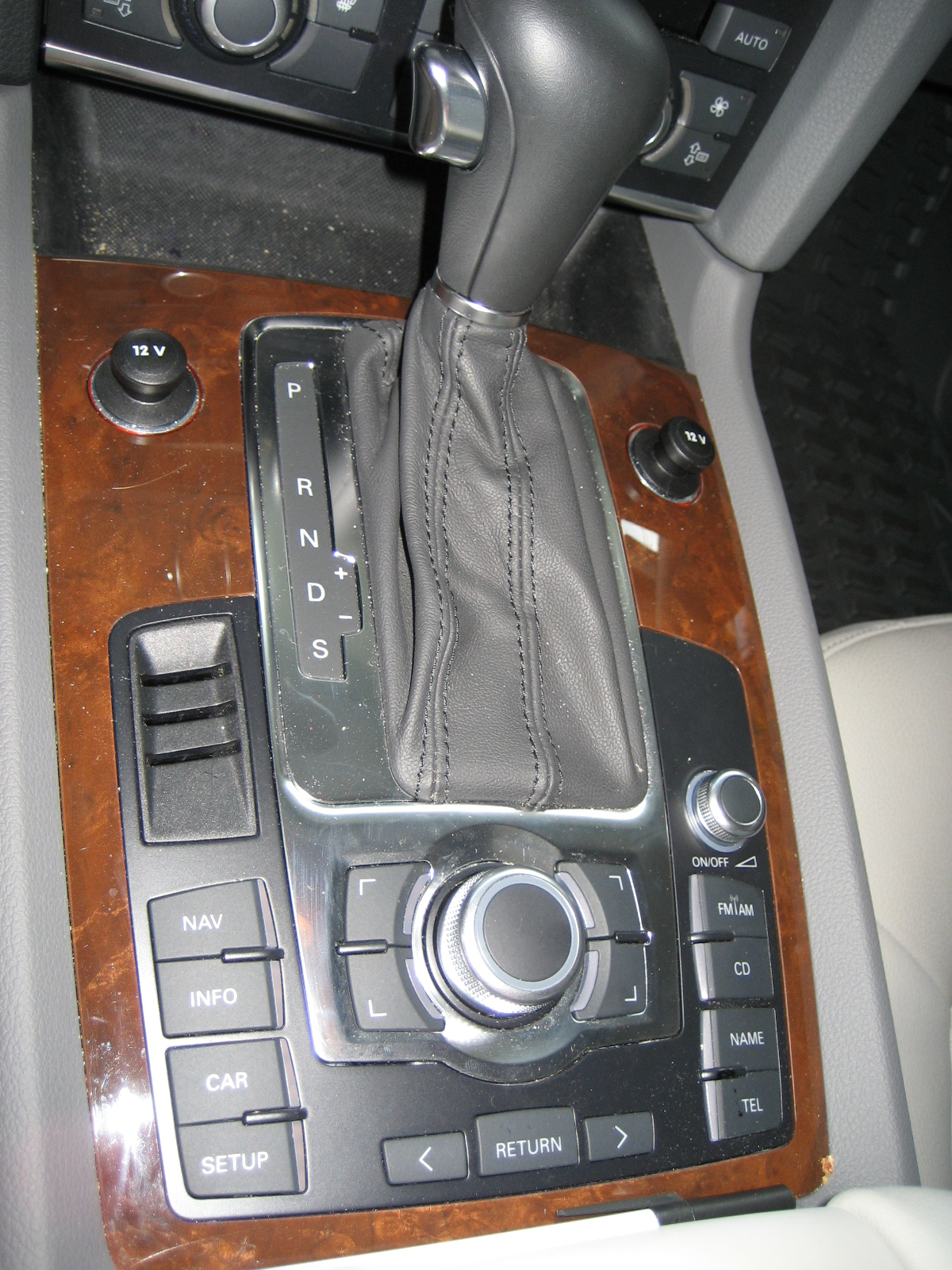
The MMI controls (to the rear of the gear lever) on a left-hand drive Audi Q7

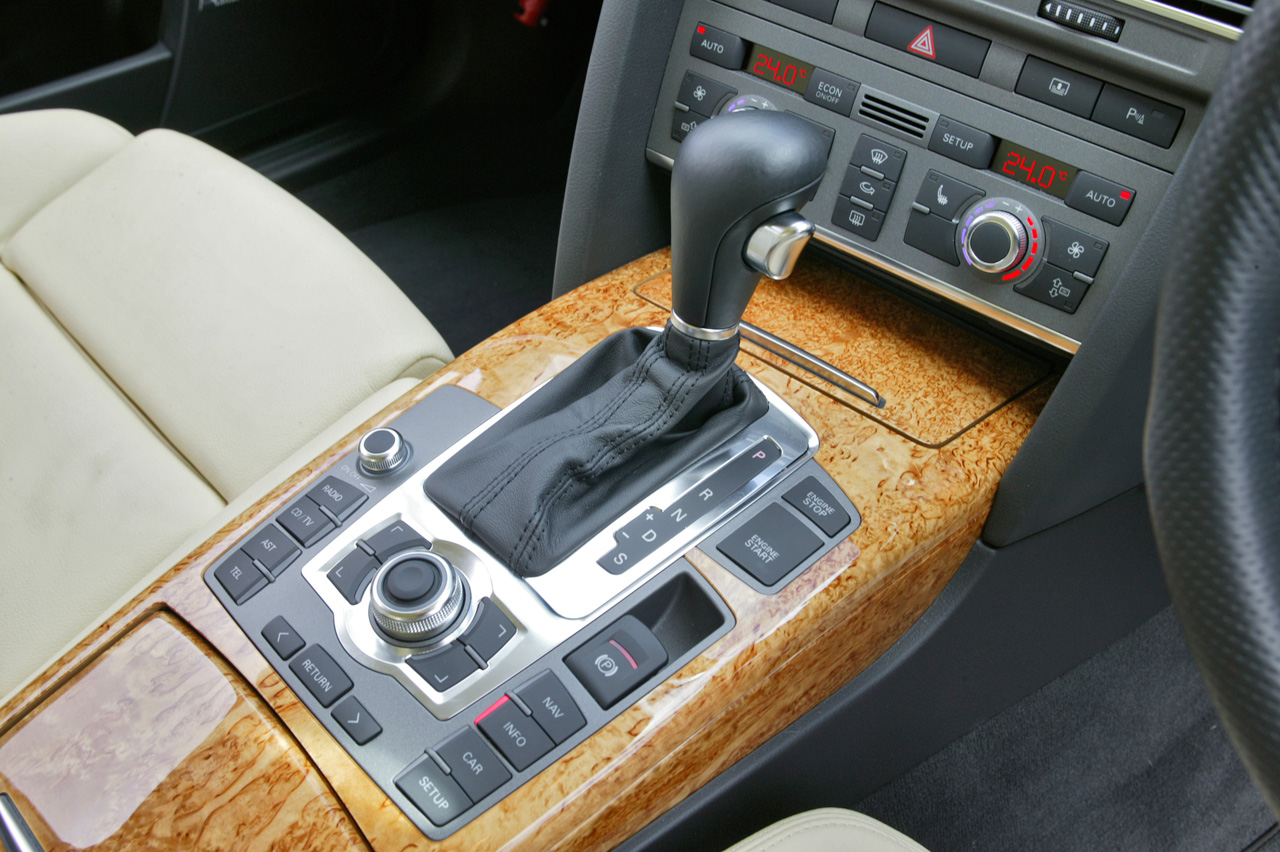
A right-hand drive 2005 Audi A6 (C6), showing the Multi Media Interface (MMI) controls

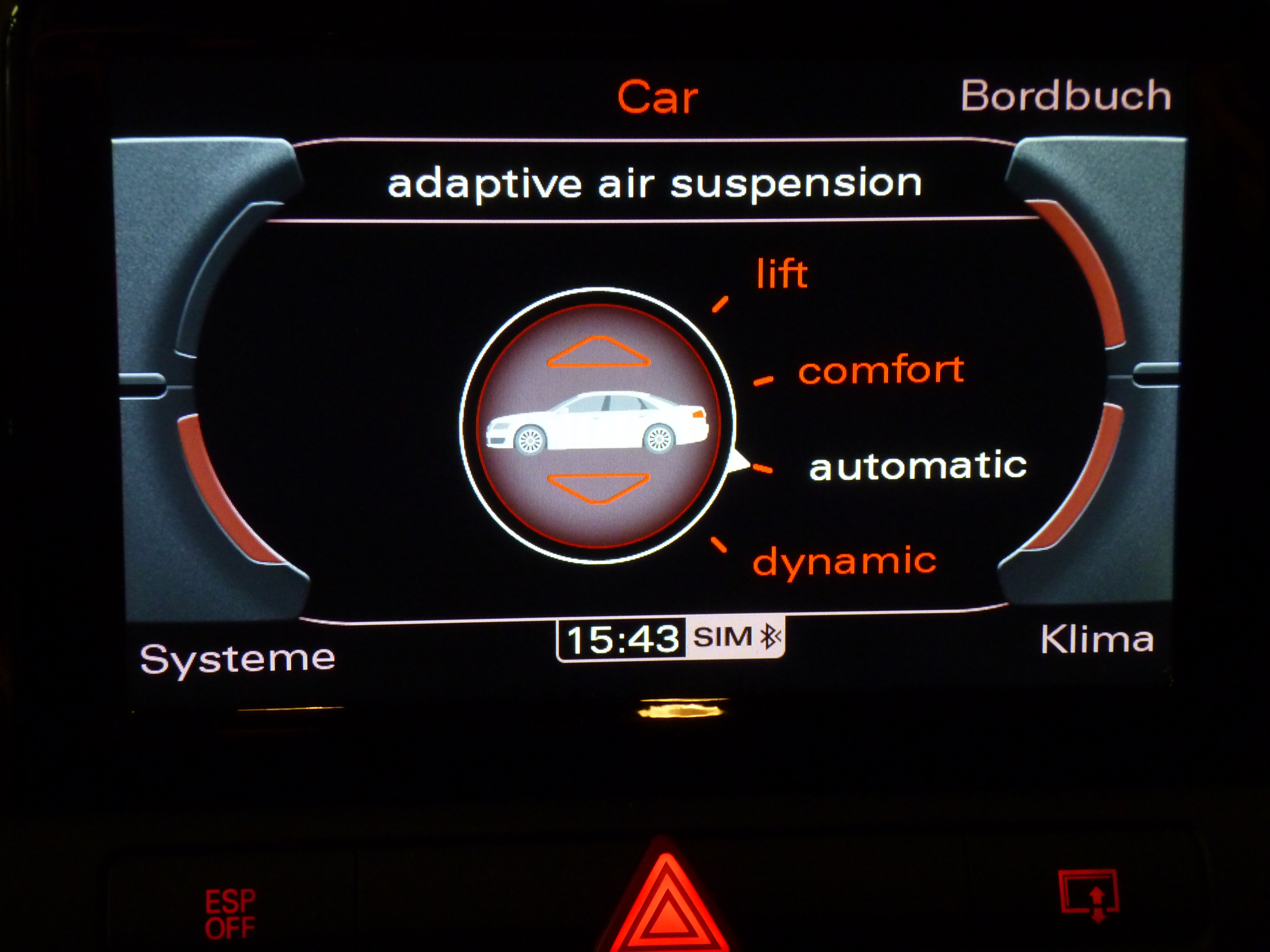
An Audi A8 Multi Media Interface control screen for its Adaptive Air Suspension

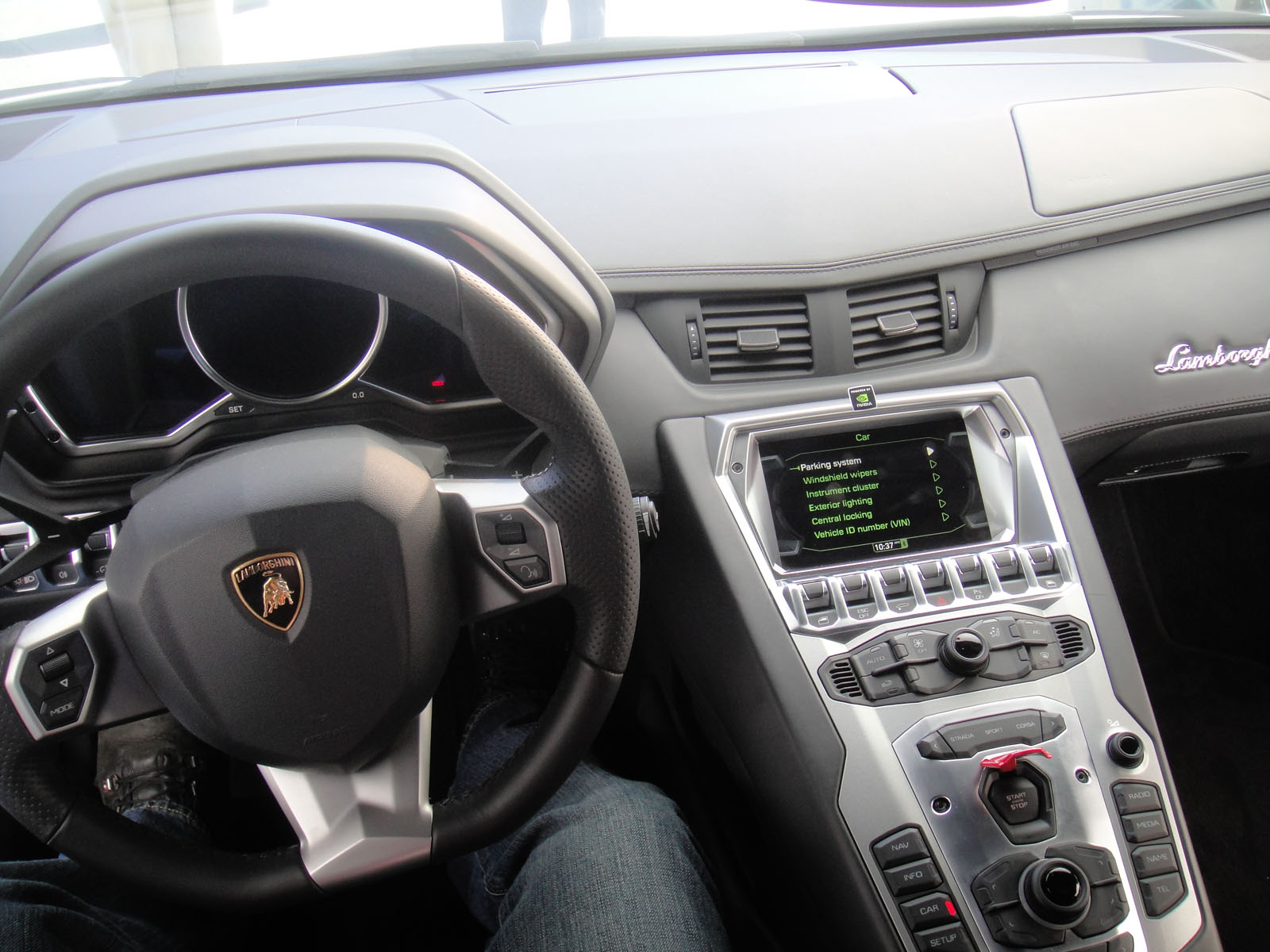
Nvidia-based Multi Media Interface control screen in a Lamborghini at Consumer Electronics Show

== Functions ==
MMI operates in car entertainment components, car electronics, and other functions. Depending on the actual car model, along with which version was specified (MMI Basic, MMI High, etc.), only some, and not all functions will be applicable or available.

- Satellite navigation, including traffic management (TMC)
- Radio tuner
- Media sources (CD changer, Audi Music Interface, aux audio port, TV tuner, two external AV sources)
- Telephone and directory
- Heating, ventilation, air conditioning, climate control, and seat heating
- Car setup (e.g. central locking and convenience function (coming home/leaving home, power sunroof and windows) options, global audio settings, suspension settings, interior lighting, Audi Side Assist settings etc.)
- Rear view camera and parking sensors
- Driver information (e.g. fuel economy statistics (often encompassed by "trip computer" functions), battery level, oil level, tire-pressure monitoring, etc.)
- User manual (full on-board car user manual, displayed on screen)
- Apple CarPlay and Android Auto for 2014 and later model.

== Cars ==
Audi models for which MMI is available:

== MMI Generation RNS-E ==
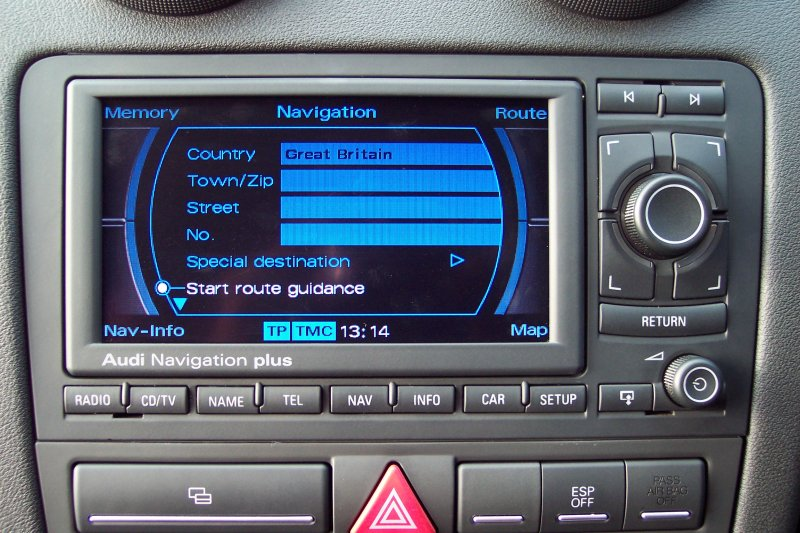
Navigation system (RNS-E) with MMI control logic in an Audi A3 8P

Certain cars have a "pseudo" type of MMI. These are the Audi A3 (8P), A4 (B6 and B7), A6 (C5), TT (8J), the R8, SEAT Exeo, and Lamborghini Gallardo - when fitted with the RNS-E DVD-based "Audi Navigation Plus" system. While appearing to be a similar layout, and operating similarly, these two systems are very different, are unable to share mapping disks or software, and are not able to control non-ICE functions (such as climate, convenience or suspension settings).

On members of the B8 family of vehicles (the A4 (TYP 8K), A5 (TYP 8T), and Q5 (TYP 8R)) without full navigation capability, Audi does not describe this infotainment system as MMI. However, an MMI-esque control dial and function keys is provided on the radio/CD head unit.

== MMI Generations 2G through 3G+ ==
The MMI system has been improved over the years and now features internet connectivity through MMI Connect introduced in recent models.

| | MMI Generation | | | | |
| Feature | MMI High 2G (DVD-Rom;7Q2) | MMI 3G Basic (DVD-Rom;7T2) | MMI 3G HIGH (HD;7T6) | MMI 3G Plus (HD; 7T6) | MMI 3G+ (Connect) |
|---|---|---|---|---|---|
| Display | 6.5-inch TFT color display with a resolution of 480x240 | 6.5-inch TFT color display with a resolution of 480x240 | 7-inch TFT color display WVGA resolution (800x480) | 7-inch TFT color display WVGA resolution (800x480) | 7-inch TFT color display WVGA resolution (800x480) |
| Input | | | Total number of function keys reduced from eight to four. MMI dial now incorporates a joystick functionality. | A touchpad feature was introduced in the 2011 A8 which enables handwriting recognition which allows input multimedia, navigation and communications commands. | MMI TouchPad or dial |
| Radio | Sirius/HD-Radio/FM/AM/DAB | Sirius/HD-Radio/FM/AM/DAB | Sirius/HD-Radio/FM/AM/DAB | Sirius/HD Radio/FM/AM/DAB+ | Sirius/HD Radio/FM/AM/DAB+ |
| Media | MP3 from CD, iPod (MDI), USB, Aux-In, Bluetooth streaming through separate accessory | MP3 from CD, SD Card, iPod (MDI), USB, Aux-In, Bluetooth streaming through separate accessory | MP3 from CD, SD Card, DVD Audio/video, built-in Hard disk, DVD drive, iPod (MDI), USB, Aux-in, Bluetooth streaming available through aftermarket solutions | MP3 from CD, SD Card, DVD Audio/video, built-in Hard disk, DVD drive, iPod (MDI), USB, Aux-in, Bluetooth Streaming | MP3 from CD, SD Card, DVD Audio/video, built-in Hard disk, DVD drive, iPod (MDI), USB, Aux-in, Bluetooth Streaming, WiFi hotspot |
| Vehicles | A6 (4F) Lim. Week 05/2004>Week 44/2008; A6 Avant (4F) Week 02/2005>Week 44/2008; A6 Allroad (4FH) Week 12/2006>Week 44/2008; A8 (4E) Week 26/2002>Week 36/2008; Q7 Week 06/2006>Week 21/2009; A5 Week 08/2007>Week 35/2008; A4(8K) Lim. Week 36/2007>Week 21/2009; A4(8K) Avant Week 03/2008>Week 21/2009 | A4 Week 22/2009> A4 Allroad Week 22/2010> A5 Week 22/2009> A5 Sportback+Cabriolet Week 45/2008> A6 (C6) Week 45/2008> Q5 Week 22/2009>Week 24/2012; Q7 Week 22/2009> | A1 Week 34/2010> A1 Sportback Week 45/2011> A4 Lim.+ Avant Week 22/2009> A4 Allroad Week 22/2010> A5 Week 36/2008> A5 Sportback+Cabriolet Week 45/2008> A6 (4F) Week 41/2008> A6 (4G); A7; A8(4E) Week 36/2008> A8 (4H); Q3> Q5 2009>2012; Q5 Hybrid Week 26/2011>2012; Q7 Week 22/2009> | Audi A8 (4H) Week 45/2010> A4 Lim.+ Avant Week 2011> | Audi Q5 2013> Audi A8 (4H) Week 45/2010> A4 Lim.+ Avant Week 2011> |
| Maps | 2D Maps (3D from software version 3460) | 2D Maps | 3D Maps | 3D Maps | 3D Maps enhanced with Google Earth, Google Local Search, Google Voice Local Search and myAudi Destinations |
| Latest Navigation Database | 2018 4E0 060 884 FF | 2023 4G0 060 884 AN | 2023 8R0 060 884 KL (needs activation SD Card) | 2023 8R0 060 884 KL (needs activation SD Card) | 2023 8R0 060 884 KL (needs activation SD Card) |

=== Issues ===
While seemingly intuitive and user-friendly, MMI can be difficult to operate when driving. Attempts have been made to improve access: the MMI 3G features a new Joystick on the central knob to make it easier to, for example, input a destination using the navigation map. However, the issues remain. The Audi Q5's MMI infotainment control system is difficult to navigate, partly due to the location of its controls low down on the center console.

=== Software updates ===
MMI 3G and 3G+ systems have to be updated by an Audi dealer. The MMI 2G firmware can be updated by car owners.

- MMI 2G systems can be updated via a CD containing the firmware update. Navigation maps are read in real time from DVD drive located in the trunk.
- MMI 3G and 3G+ systems can be updated by using a SD Card/USB/CD/DVD containing the software. The total update process can take approximately 1 hour and 45 minutes. Once the updated software is applied it requires a PIN to re-activate the navigation system.
- To enter the MMI software update menu, the [Setup] and [Return] buttons have to be pressed simultaneously for 5 seconds. This menu also enables import/export settings to USB or SD Card, the settings are saved as an AES encrypted zip file.
- Software version format varies by MMI system type:
  - MMI 2G: SW: XX-XX XX.X.X XXXX
  - MMI 3G Basic: BNAV_XX_XXXXX
  - MMI 3G High: HNAV_XX_XXXXX
  - MMI 3G+: HN+_XX_XXXXX [A1 A4 A5 Q5 Q7] HN+R_XX_XXXXX [A6 A7 A8 Q3]
  - MMI RMC: RMC_XX_XXXXX
  - MMI MIB1: MHIG_XX_XXXX
  - MMI MIB2: MHI2_XX_XXXX
  - MMI MSTD: MSTD_XX_XXXX
  - MMI MIB3: MHI3_XX_XXX

MMI 2G software version history

| Partnumber | Firmware Version | Region | Details |
|---|---|---|---|
| 4E0 906 961 B | 0770 (07.7.0) | Europe / Rest of the World | Note: Other earlier versions exist (290,350,500) but no part numbers available. [Possibly only installed in cars and never available as update CDs]. |
| | 0890 (08.9.0) | Europe / Rest of the World | It's possible to update direct to 5150 from this level. |
| 4E0 906 961 E | 0900 (09.9.0) | Europe / Rest of the World | |
| 4E0 906 961 H | 1110 (11.1.0) | Europe / Rest of the World | This level believed to be needed to upgrade to 5150 from versions before 0890. [It includes an intermediate level U385]! |
| 4E0 906 961 L | 2120 (21.2.0) | Europe / Rest of the World | |
| 4E0 906 961 N | 2830 (28.3.0) | Europe / Rest of the World | |
| 4E0 906 961 T | 3460 (34.6.0) | Europe / Rest of the World | Brings 3D view in GPS navigation |
| 4E0 906 961 AA | 4220 (42.2.0) | Europe / Rest of the World | |
| 4F0 906 961 AB | 5150 (51.5.0) | Europe / Rest of the World | To update from (0600–2750) to 3360 |
| | 5170 (51.7.0) | Europe / Rest of the World | |
| 4L0 998 961 | 5570 (55.7.0) | Europe | (A6/A8/Q7) 3-CD set (SVM-Code: MMIEUK1006) |
| 8K0 998 961 | 5570 (55.7.0) | Europe / Rest of the World | (A4/B8/A5) 3-CD set |
| | 0600 (06.0.0) | North-America | |
| | 1070 (10.7.0) | North-America | |
| | 1190 (11.9.0) | North-America | |
| | 2750 (27.5.0) | North-America | |
| | 3310 (33.1.0) | North-America | |
| 4F0 906 961 AB | 3360 (33.6.0) | North-America | Versions below 1070 must be updated 3360 before any newer versions can be installed. Navigation DVD ver. 5 is also required |
| 4L0 906 961 H | 4140 (41.4.0) | North-America | Update to 3360 before attempting to update to 4140. Updating from earlier versions can corrupt the MMI controller. |
| 4F0 998 961 | 4610 (46.1.0) | North-America | Versions 1070 and newer can be updated directly to 4610. Some <2005 build cars also require a newer version CAN-Bus gateway module to maintain full audiopilot function. |

MMI 3G and 3G+ MMI software version history

All 3G systems are on HDD; P=Shipped with car; K=Installed by Update

BBT seems to be for Basic without Navigation, BNAV for 3G Basic, HNAV for 3G High, HN+/HN+R for 3GPlus

| Software Version | Region | Details |
|---|---|---|
| BBT_EU_P0054_D1 | Europe | Shipped with 2011 Q7 / aka MMI 3G LowII |
| BNav_EU_P0029_D1 | Europe | Shipped with 2009 A4(B8) Basic |
| BNav_EU_P0054_D1 | Europe | Basic |
| BNav_EU_P0206_D1 | Europe | 2013 MMI 3G basic plus (non HDD, 3D, Joystick) |
| BNav_EU_K0031_2_D1 | Europe | Basic |
| BNav_EU_K0070_2_D1 | Europe | 2011 MMI 3G basic plus (non HDD, 3D, Joystick) |
| BNav_EU_K0206_2_D1 | Europe | 2012 MMI 3G basic plus (non HDD, 3D, Joystick) |
| BNav_EU_K_0256 EU | Europe | 2013 MMI 3G basic plus (non HDD, 3D, Joystick) |
| BNav_EU_K_0257 EU | Europe | 2014 MMI 3G basic plus (non HDD, 3D, Joystick) |
| BNav_EU_K_0260 EU | Europe | 2016 MMI 3G basic plus (non HDD, 3D, Joystick) |
| HNav_EU_P0014_D1 | Europe | |
| HNav_EU_P0022_D1 | Europe | |
| HNav_EU_K0022_1_D1 | Europe | |
| HNav_EU_K0022_2_D1 | Europe | |
| HNAV_EU_P0029_D1 | Europe | Installed on 2010 Q5 |
| HNav_EU_K0031_3_D1 | Europe | 2010 |
| HNav_EU_K0054_2_D1 | Europe | |
| HNav_EU_P0072_1_D1 | Europe | 2011 |
| HNav_EU_K0206_3_D1 | Europe | 2012 |
| HNav_EU_K0253_D1 | Europe | 2013 |
| HNav_EU_K0257_5_D1 | Europe | 2014 |
| HNav_EU_K0257_6_D1 | Europe | 2016 |
| HN+_EU_AU3G_P0467 | Europe | 2012 |
| HN+_EU_AU3G_P0485 | Europe | |
| HN+_EU_AU3G_P0612 | Europe | Shipped with 2013 Q5 Models |
| HN+_EU_AU3G_K0767 | Europe | In software 8R0906961DH |
| HN+_EU_AU210_P0532 | Europe | Shipped with 2012 A1 Sportsback |
| HNav_US_K0110_1_D1 | North-America | Shipped with 2009 Q5 Models |
| HNav_US_P0110_D1 | North-America | Shipped with 2010 A4-A5-A6-Q5-Q7 Models |
| HNav_US_P0114_D1 | North-America | Shipped with 2011 A4-A5-A6-Q5-Q7 Models |
| HNav_US_P0118_D1 | North-America | Shipped with 2012 A4-A5-A6-Q5 Models. Fixes issue with punctuations and hyphens in street names |
| HNav_US_K0133_3_D1 | North-America | Latest 3G HIGH update. Available for download by Audi dealer beginning May, 2014 (8R0906961CP). Fixes issues with MMI system periodically being inoperative/freezing, no audio, bluetooth being inoperative or losing connection, bluetooth phone not downloading contacts, satellite radio band not being available in band selection screen, satellite radio presets sporadically disappear. |
| HN+_US_AU_P0110 | North-America | Shipped with end of 2011 A8 Models (Without RSE) |
| HN+R_US_AU_P0409 | North-America | Shipped with end of 2012 A6/A8 Models |
| HN+_US_AU3G_P0467 | North-America | Shipped with 2012 Q7 Model |
| HN+_US_AU3G_P0487 | North-America | Shipped with 2012 Q7 Model |
| HN+_US_AU3G_P0566 | North-America | Shipped with 2013 A4-A5-Q5-Q7 Models |
| HN+_US_AU3G_P0609 | North-America | Shipped with 2013 A4-A5-Q5-Q7 Models |
| HN+R_US_AU_P0609 | North America | Shipped with 2013 Audi Q3-A6-A7-A8 |
| HN+_US_AU3G_P0715 | North-America | Shipped with 2014 A4-A5-Q5-Q7 Models |
| HN+_US_AU3G_P0726 | North-America | Shipped with 2014 A4-A5-Q5-Q7 Models |
| HN+_US_AU3G_P0733 | North-America | Shipped with 2014/2015 A4-A5-Q5-Q7 Models |
| HN+_US_AU3G_P0814 | North-America | Shipped with 2015 A4-A5-Q5-Q7 Models |
| HN+_US_AU3G_P0900 | North-America | Shipped with early 2016 A4-A5-Q5-Q7 Models |
| HN+_US_AU3G_P0925 | North-America | Shipped with 2016 A4-A5-Q5-Q7 Models |
| HN+_US_AU3G_P0942 | North-America | Shipped with 2016/2017 A4-A5-Q5-Q7 Models |

MMI 3G and 3G+ navigation database versions

| P/N Nav. Database | P/N Activation | Nav. Database Version | Region | Details |
|---|---|---|---|---|
3G Basic [BNAV_...]
| 4G0 919 884 A | | ECE 5.6.8 | Europe | 2009 Edition |
| 4G0 919 884 D | | ECE 5.8.4 | Europe | 2009/2010 Edition |
| 4G0 919 884 F | | ECE 5.10.5 | Europe | 2010 Edition |
| 4G0 919 884 G | | ECE 5.11.8 | Europe | 2010/2011 Edition |
| 4G0 919 884 J | | ECE 5.12.4 | Europe | 2011 Edition |
| 4G0 919 884 K | | ECE 5.13.8 | Europe | 2012 Edition |
| 4G0 919 884 L | | ECE 5.15.3 | Europe | 2013 Edition |
| 4G0 919 884 N | | ECE 5.17.2 | Europe | 2014 Edition |
| 4G0 919 884 Q | | ECE 5.20.4 | Europe | 2015 Edition |
| 4G0 919 884 R | | ECE 5.21.2 | Europe | 2015/2016 Edition |
| 4G0 919 884 S | | ECE 5.22.3 | Europe | 2016 Edition |
| 4G0 919 884 AA | | ECE 5.24.2 | Europe | 2017 Edition |
| 4G0 060 884 AB | | ECE 5.25.2 | Europe | 2017/2018 Edition |
| 4G0 060 884 AC | | ECE 5.26.2 | Europe | 2018 Edition |
| 4G0 060 884 AD | | ECE 5.27.2 | Europe | 2018/2019 Edition |
| 4G0 060 884 AE | | ECE 5.28.2 | Europe | 2019 Edition |
| 4G0 060 884 AF | | ECE 5.29.2 | Europe | 2019/2020 Edition |
| 4G0 060 884 AG | | ECE 5.30.2 | Europe | 2020 Edition |
| 4G0 060 884 AH | | ECE 5.31.2 | Europe | 2020/2021 Edition |
| 4G0 060 884 AJ | | ECE 5.32.2 | Europe | 2021 Edition |
| 4G0 060 884 AK | | ECE 5.33.2 | Europe | 2021/2022 Edition |
| 4G0 060 884 AL | | ECE 5.34.2 | Europe | 2022 Edition |
| 4G0 060 884 AM | | ECE 5.35.2 | Europe | 2022/2023 Edition |
| 4G0 060 884 AN | | ECE 5.36.2 | Europe | 2023 Edition |
3G+/3G High [HN....]
| 8R0 051 884 A | | NAR 5.2.3 | North America | 2009/2010 Edition (Factory installed) |
| 8R0 051 884 F | | NAR 5.3.4 | North America | 2010 Edition (Factory installed) |
| 8R0 051 884 P | | NAR 5.4.7 | North America | 2011 Edition (Factory installed) |
| 8R0 051 884 AC | | NAR 5.5.3 | North America | 2011/2012 Edition (Factory installed) |
| 8R0 051 884 AD | | NAR 5.5.5 | North America | 2012 Edition |
| 8R0 051 884 AL | | NAR 5.5.6 | North America | 2012 Edition. (Dealer installed). Same as 5.5.5 |
| 8R0 051 884 AM | | NAR 5.6.5 | North America | 2012/2013 Edition (Factory installed) |
| 8R0 051 884 BA | | NAR 5.7.3 | North America | 2013 Edition (Factory installed) |
| 8R0 051 884 BD | | NAR 6.8.2 | North America | 2013/2014 Edition (Dealer Installed) |
| 8R0 051 884 BL | | NAR 6.9.2 | North America | 2014 Edition (Factory installed) |
| 8R0 051 884 CA | | NAR 6.10.2 | North America | 2014/2015 Edition (Dealer Installed) |
| 8R0 051 884 CJ | | NAR 6.11.2 | North America | 2015 Edition (Factory installed) |
| 8R0 051 884 CS | 8R0 060 884 CS | NAR 6.12.1 | North America | 2015/2016 Edition (Dealer installed) |
| 8R0 051 884 DG | 8R0 060 884 DG | NAR 6.13.2 | North America | 2016 Edition (Factory installed) |
| 8R0 051 884 DQ | 8R0 060 884 DQ | NAR 6.14.? | North America | 2016/2017 Edition (Dealer installed) *Release Cancelled* |
| 8R0 051 884 EE | 8R0 060 884 EE | NAR 6.15.? | North America | 2017 Edition (Factory installed) |
| 8R0 051 884 EN | 8R0 060 884 EN | NAR 6.16.2 | North America | 2017/2018 Edition |
| 8R0 051 884 FD | 8R0 060 884 FD | NAR 6.17.? | North America | 2018 Edition |
| 8R0 051 884 FL | 8R0 060 884 FL | NAR 6.18.? | North America | 2018/2019 Edition |
| 8R0 051 884 GB | 8R0 060 884 GB | NAR 6.19.? | North America | 2019 Edition |
| 8R0 051 884 GJ | 8R0 060 884 GJ | NAR 6.20.1 | North America | 2019/2020 Edition |
| 8R0 051 884 HG | 8R0 060 884 HG | NAR 6.22.1 | North America | 2020/2021 Edition |
| 8R0 051 884 JE | 8R0 060 884 JE | NAR 6.23.? | North America | 2021/2022 Edition [part no suffix corrected from JH] |
| 8R0 051 884 | | ECE 5.5.5 | Europe | 2008 Edition |
| 8R0 051 884 C | 8R0 060 884 C | ECE 5.6.8 | Europe | 2008/2009 Edition |
| 8R0 051 884 E | 8R0 060 884 E | ECE 5.8.5 | Europe | 2009 Edition |
| 8R0 051 884 J | 8R0 060 884 J | ECE 5.10.5 | Europe | 2009/2010 Edition |
| 8R0 051 884 R | 8R0 060 884 R | ECE 5.11.7 | Europe | 2010 Edition |
| 8R0 051 884 N | 8R0 060 884 N | ECE 5.12.5 | Europe | 2011 Edition |
| 8R0 051 884 AH | 8R0 060 884 AH | ECE 5.13.8 | Europe | 2012 Edition |
| 8R0 051 884 AR | 8R0 060 884 AR | ECE 6.15.5 | Europe | 2013 Edition |
| 8R0 051 884 BC | 8R0 060 884 BC | ECE 6.16.3 | Europe | 2013/2014 Edition |
| 8R0 051 884 BK | 8R0 060 884 BK | ECE 6.17.3 | Europe | 2014 Edition |
| 8R0 051 884 BT | 8R0 060 884 BT | ECE 6.19.3 | Europe | 2014/2015 Edition |
| 8R0 051 884 CH | 8R0 060 884 CH | ECE 6.20.4 | Europe | 2015 Edition |
| 8R0 051 884 CR | 8R0 060 884 CR | ECE 6.21.2 | Europe | 2015/2016 Edition |
| 8R0 051 884 DF | 8R0 060 884 DF | ECE 6.22.4 | Europe | 2016 Edition |
| 8R0 051 884 DP | 8R0 060 884 DP | ECE 6.23.2 | Europe | 2016/2017 Edition |
| 8R0 051 884 ED | 8R0 060 884 ED | ECE 6.24.2 | Europe | 2017 Edition |
| 8R0 051 884 EM | 8R0 060 884 EM | ECE 6.25.3 | Europe | 2017/2018 Edition |
| 8R0 051 884 FC | 8R0 060 884 FC | ECE 6.26.1 | Europe | 2018 Edition |
| 8R0 051 884 FK | 8R0 060 884 FK | ECE 6.27.2 | Europe | 2018/2019 Edition |
| 8R0 051 884 GA | 8R0 060 884 GA | ECE 6.28.2 | Europe | 2019 Edition |
| 8R0 051 884 GH | 8R0 060 884 GH | ECE 6.29.1 | Europe | 2019/2020 Edition |
| 8R0 051 884 GS | 8R0 060 884 GS | ECE 6.30.1 | Europe | 2020 Edition |
| 8R0 051 884 HF | 8R0 060 884 HF | ECE 6.31.1 | Europe | 2020/2021 Edition |
| 8R0 051 884 HQ | 8R0 060 884 HQ | ECE 6.32.1 | Europe | 2021 Edition |
| 8R0 051 884 JD | 8R0 060 884 JD | ECE 6.33.1 | Europe | 2021/2022 Edition |
| 8R0 051 884 JN | 8R0 060 884 JN | ECE 6.34.1 | Europe | 2022 Edition |
| 8R0 051 884 KB | 8R0 060 884 KB | ECE 6.35.1 | Europe | 2022/2023 Edition |
| 8R0 051 884 KL | 8R0 060 884 KL | ECE 6.36.0 | Europe | 2023 Edition - no update anymore |

Partial list of MMI firmware updates [by Part Number] for 3G Basic, 3G High and 3G Plus:

| Part number | Navigation version | Region | Firmware version | Details |
|---|---|---|---|---|
| 8R0906961 | MMI 3G HNAV | EU | | |
| 8R0906961A | MMI 3G HNAV | | | |
| 8R0906961B | MMI 3G HNAV | EU | | -> 8R0906961D |
| 8R0906961C | MMI 3G HNAV | EU | | -> 8R0906961J |
| 8R0906961D | MMI 3G HNAV | EU | | |
| 8R0906961E | MMI 3G HNAV | | | |
| 8R0906961F | MMI 3G HNAV | EU | | |
| 8R0906961G | MMI 3G BNAV | EU | | |
| 8R0906961H | MMI 3G HNAV | AU | | |
| 8R0906961J | MMI 3G HNAV | EU | K_022 | |
| 8R0906961M | MMI 3GP HN+R | EU | K_066 | (A6/A8/A7) SVM:3GPEU066 |
| 8R0906961P | MMI 3G BNAV / HNAV | EU | | -> 8R0906961AA |
| 8R0906961R | MMI 3G HNAV | NAR | K_114 | (A6 (4F), Q7, Q5, A4, A5) SW0116 SVM:3GHUS114 |
| 8R0906961S | MMI 3G HNAV | US | | |
| 8R0906961T | MMI 3G HNAV | EU/RdW | K_031 | (A6 (4F), Q7, A8(4E), Q5, A4, A5)SW0143 SVM:3GHEU031 |
| 8R0906961AA | MMI 3G BNAV | EU | K_031 | (A6 (4F), Q7, Q5, A4, A5)SW0144 SVM:3GBEU031 |
| 8R0906961AB | MMI 3G HNAV | EU/US | | Display Update SVM:3GHDISPLAY (contains K206, K_574, K_377 & K_275) |
| 8R0906961AC | MMI 3G HNAV | CN | | |
| 8R0906961AD | MMI 3G HNAV | JP | | |
| 8R0906961AE | MMI 3G HNAV | KR | | |
| 8R0906961AF | MMI 3G HNAV | | K_054 | |
| 8R0906961AG | MMI 3G BNAV | EU | | -> 8R0906961AH - (support for 2013 maps) |
| 8R0906961AJ | MMI 3G HNAV | EU | K_072 | (A6 (4F), Q7, Q5, A4, A5) SVM:3GHEU072 |
| 8R0906961AS | MMI 3G HNAV | EU/RdW | K_0206 | (A6 (4F), Q7, A8(4E), Q5, A4, A5) SW0174 SVM:3GHEU206 |
| 8R0906961AK | MMI 3GP HN+/HN+R | | | DAB+ Update |
| 8R0906961AL | MMI 3G HNAV | EU | | DAB+ Update SVM:3GRU0098 |
| 8R0906961AM | MMI 3GP HN+R | EU | K_0485 | (A6/A8/A7) SVM:3GPEUK485 |
| 8R0906961AN | MMI 3GP HN+R | CN | K_0364 | (A6/A8/A7) |
| 8R0906961AP | MMI 3GP HN+R | JP | K_0264 | (A6/A8/A7) |
| 8R0906961BB | MMI 3G HNAV | KR | K_0574 | (A6 (4F), Q7, A8(4E), Q5, A4, A5) SW0574 SVM:3GHKR574 |
| 8R0906961BD | MMI 3G BNAV | EU | K_0206 | (A6(4F), Q7, Q5, A4, A5)SW0175 SVM:3GBEU206 |
| 8R0906961BK | MMI 3GP HN+ | EU | K_0517 | (A4/A5/Q5 hybrid/Q7) SW0482 SVM:3GPEU517 |
| 8R0906961BL | MMI 3GP HN+ | EU | K_0517 | (A1) SW0483 SVM:3GPEU517A1 |
| 8R0906961BM | MMI 3GP HN+R | EU | K_0518 | (Q3/A6/A8/A7) SW0484 SVM:3GPEU518 |
| 8R0906961BN | MMI 3G HNAV | CN | K_0377 | (A6 (4F), Q7, A8(4E), Q5, A4, A5) SW0100 SVM:3GHCN377 |
| 8R0906961BP | MMI 3G HNAV | JP | K_0275 | (A6 (4F), Q7, A8(4E), Q5, A4, A5) SW0272 SVM:3GHJP275 |
| 8R0906961BT | MMI 3GP HN+R | EU | K_0612 | (Q3/A6/A8/A7) SVM:3GPEU612 |
| 8R0906961CA | MMI 3GP HN+ | EU | K_0612 | (A4, A5, Q5, Q7) SVM:3GPEU612AU3G |
| 8R0906961CB | MMI 3GP HN+ | EU | K_0612 | (A1) SVM:3GPEU612A1 |
| 8R0906961CC | MMI 3G HNAV | EU | K_0253 | (A4, A5, Q5, A6, A8, Q7) SVM:3GHEU253 |
| 8R0906961CD | MMI 3GP HN+R | EU | K_0614 | (Q3/A6/A8/A7) SVM:3GPEU614 |
| 8R0906961CE | MMI 3GP HN+ | EU | K_0614 | (A4/A5/Q5/Q7) SVM:3GPEU614AU3G |
| 8R0906961CF | MMI 3G HNAV | US | | |
| 8R0906961CG | MMI 3G BNAV | EU | K_0256 | (A4/A5/Q5/A6/Q7) SVM:3GBEU256 |
| 8R0906961CH | MMI 3GP HN+R | JP | K_0284 | (A6/A7/A8/Q3) SVM:3GPJP284 |
| 8R0906961CJ | MMI 3GP HN+ | JP | K_0284 | (A4/A5/Q5/Q7) SVM:3GPJP283AU3G |
| 8R0906961CK | MMI 3GP HN+ | JP | K_0284 | (A1) SVM:3GPJP284A1 |
| 8R0906961CL | MMI 3GP HN+R | US | K_0715 | (A6/A7/A8/Q3) SVM:3GPUS715 |
| 8R0906961CM | MMI 3GP HN+ | US | K_0715 | (A4/A5/Q5/Q7) SVM:3GPUS715AU3G |
| 8R0906961CN | MMI 3GP HN+ | US | K_0715 | (A1) SVM:3GPUS715A1 |
| 8R0906961CP | MMI 3G HNAV | US | K_0133 | (A4, A5, Q5, A6, Q7) SVM:3GHUS133 |
| 8R0906961CQ | MMI 3GP HN+ | KR | K_0584 | (A4/A5/Q5/Q7) SVM:3GPKR584AU3G |
| 8R0906961CR | MMI 3GP HN+R | KR | K_0584 | (A6/A7/A8/Q3) SVM:3GPKR584 |
| 8R0906961CS | MMI 3GP HN+R | TW | K_0384 | (A6/A7/A8/Q3) SVM:3GPTW384 |
| 8R0906961CT | MMI 3GP HN+ | TW | K_0384 | (A4/A5/Q5/Q7) SVM:3GPTW384AU3G |
| 8R0906961DA | MMI 3GP HN+ | KR | K_0384 | (A1) SVM:3GPTW384A1 |
| 8R0906961DB | MMI 3GP HN+ | CN | K_0384 | (A1) SVM:3GPCN384A1 |
| 8R0906961DC | MMI 3GP HN+ | CN | K_0384 | (A4/A5/Q5/Q7) SVM:3GPCN384AU3G |
| 8R0906961DD | MMI 3GP HN+R | CN | K_0384 | (A6/A7/A8/Q3) SVM:3GPCN384 |
| 8R0906961DE | MMI 3G BNAV | US | K_0250 | (A6/Q7) SVM:3GBUS250 |
| 8R0906961DF | MMI 3G HNAV | EU | K_0257 | (A4, A5, Q5, A6, Q7) SVM:3GHEU257 [incorrectly marked as EU?] |
| 8R0906961DG | MMI 3GP HN+R | EU | K_0770 | (Q3/A6/A8/A7) SVM:3GPEU770 |
| 8R0906961DH | MMI 3GP HN+ | EU | K_0767 | (A4/A5/Q5/Q7) |
| 8R0906961DJ | MMI 3GP HN+ | EU | K_0770 | (A1) SVM:3GPEU770 |
| 8R0906961?? | MMI 3GP HN+R | EU | K_0783 | (Q3/A6/A8/A7) |
| 8R0906961DL | MMI 3GP HN+ | US | K_0814 | (A1) |
| 8R0906961DM | MMI 3GP HN+R | US | K_0814 | (Q3/A6/A8/A7) |
| 8R0906961DN | MMI 3GP HN+R | US | K_0814 | (A4/A5/Q5/Q7) |
| 8R0906961DP | MMI 3G BNAV | EU | K_0260 | (A4/A5/Q5/A6/Q7) SVM:3GBEU260 (Probable Final version) |
| 8R0906961DQ | MMI 3G HNAV | EU | K_0257 | (A4/A5/Q5/A6/Q7) SVM:3GHEU257 (Probable Final version) |
| 8R0906961DR | MMI 3GP HN+R | EU | K_0814 | (Q3/A6/A8/A7) |
| 8R0906961DS | MMI 3GP HN+ | EU | K_0814 | (A4/A5/Q5/Q7) |
| 8R0906961DT | MMI 3GP HN+ | EU | K_0814 | (A1) |
| 8R0906961EA | MMI 3GP HN+R | EU | K_0900 | (Q3/A6/A8/A7) |
| 8R0906961EB | MMI 3GP HN+ | EU | K_0900 | (A4/A5/Q5/Q7) |
| 8R0906961EC | MMI 3GP HN+ | EU | K_0900 | (A1) |
| 8R0906961ES | MMI 3GP HN+R | US | K_0942 | (Q3/A6/A7/A8) |
| 8R0906961ET | MMI 3GP HN+ | US | K_0942 | (A4/A5/Q5/Q7) |
| 8R0906961FA | MMI 3GP HN+ | US | K_0942 | (A1) |
| 8R0906961FB | MMI 3GP HN+R | EU | K_0942 | (Q3/A6/A7/A8) |
| 8R0906961FC | MMI 3GP HN+ | EU | K_0942 | (A4/A5/Q5/Q7) |
| 8R0906961FD | MMI 3GP HN+ | EU | K_0942 | (A1) |
| | MMI 3GP HN+R | EU | P_1001 | (Q3/A6/A7/A8) |
| | MMI 3GP HN+R | EU | P_1050 | (Q3/A6/A7/A8) |

== Modular Infotainment Matrix (MIB) ==
=== Background ===
Modular Infotainment Matrix (MIB) is a new architecture intended to solve a challenge that is becoming increasingly urgent – innovations in consumer electronics and rapid gains in computing power are being introduced at speeds that are much faster than the product cycles of automotive manufacturers.

The central computer in the modular infotainment platform, housed in the glove box, comprises two main units in a single housing – the Radio Car Control Unit and the MMX (Multi-Media eXtension) board. Along with its working and flash memories, the plug-in module integrates a Tegra processor from Nvidia, which can handle all online, media, voice control, navigation, and telephone functions. The new architecture makes it easy to update the hardware; the fact that the MMX board can be swapped out ensures the system is always up to date.

2012 saw the debut of the Modular Infotainment Matrix (MIB) with an NVIDIA T 20 chip as its heart in the Audi A3. One-and-a-half years later, the MIB's second stage has been deployed in the Audi TT and in the new Audi A6 and A7 Sportback. The T 30 is a quad-core chip running a 3D graphic program from specialist software manufacturer Rightware to render graphics on two displays simultaneously. Thanks to the matrix’ modular structure, Audi can keep it continuously up-to-date and integrate innovations from consumer electronics. Another chip from NVIDIA, the Tegra 4, powers the Audi tablet debuting in the new Q7. With a 10.1‑inch display, the Audi tablets will provide mobile rear-seat entertainment. In the car, the special purpose tablet will connect itself to the on-board infotainment and navigation system via WLAN and can also be used on a WLAN outside the car.

=== MIB / MIB II ===
The new MIB navigation system is the first system that allows the customer to update the vehicle's navigation system on their own. The map data is available on the myAudi website for download or available in the MMI via an OTA update. For the 2015-2016 Audi A3 with MIB1, there is no OTA option in the MMI, thus the map data can only be updated using the SD card method.

For MIB1 & MIB2 vehicles, map updates are free for the first three years after the production date of the vehicle. The vehicle is automatically activated from the factory to allow the customer to update the MMI navigation with the next five releases within the next three years. This means the customer can attempt to update the MMI with the same release as many times as they want. Release schedules for map updates are approximately Calendar Week 22 (May/June) and Calendar Week 45(October/November) of each year.

==== Software version history ====
Navigation Database Versions
| Part | Version | Region | Year | Notes |
|---|---|---|---|---|
| | 0081 | NAR | 2021 | 02310028 |
| V03959803AG | 0079 | NAR | 2020/2021 | (released 06/2020) |
| V03959804CG | 0416 | NAR | 2020 | (released 11/2019) |
| V03959802DM | 0072 | NAR | 2019/2020 | (released 06/2019) |
| V03959802DL | 0069 | NAR | 2019 | (released 11/2018) |
| V03959802DK | 0066 | NAR | 2018/2019 | (released 06/2018) |
| V03959801PS | 0063 | NAR | 2018 | (released 11/2017) |
| V03959801GH | 0060 | NAR | 2017/2018 | (released 06/2017) |
| V03959801GG | 0057 | NAR | 2017 | (released 12/2016) |
| V03959801GF | 0054 | NAR | 2016/2017 | (released 06/2016) |
| V03959801GE | 0048 | NAR | 2016 | (released 03/2016) |
| V03959801GD | 0044 | NAR | 2015/2016 | |
| V03959802TK | 0189 | ECE | 2021 | (released 2021) |
| V03959802SK | 0187 | ECE | 2020/2021 | |
| V03959801FC | 0157 | ECE | 2017 | |

Software version history
| Version | Notes |
|---|---|
| 1329 | 2021 |
| 1316 | 2018, fixes issue with the top view camera |
| 1422 | 03/2016 |
| 1118 | 06/2017, Gracenote db North_america version 12 |
| 0976 | |
| 0377 | 12/2015 |
| 0443 | 03/2016 |
| 0692 | 05/2016 |
| 0918 | 12/2016 |
| 1178 | 12/2017 |

=== MIB 3 ===
MIB3 (Modular Infotainment Matrix 3) is the third generation of multimedia systems from the Volkswagen Group (VAG), introduced progressively across VW, Audi, Škoda, and Cupra/Seat models starting between 2019 and 2020.Unlike its predecessors, this system shifted heavily toward online connectivity and cloud-based features. Thanks to a built-in eSIM, MIB3 remains permanently connected to the internet, allowing for over-the-air (OTA) software updates, real-time traffic navigation, and personalized user profiles saved in the cloud. It also removed the need for cables by introducing Wireless Apple CarPlay and Wireless Android Auto.The user interface became much more touchscreen-reliant, often replacing physical buttons with touch-sensitive sliders and bringing advanced natural voice assistants like Škoda’s "Laura". While it offered groundbreaking features, early production years (2020–2022) were widely known for software stability bugs, which VAG gradually resolved through major system firmware updates.

=== MIB 4 ===
MIB4 is the latest generation of multimedia systems from the Volkswagen Group, introduced from 2024 in models such as the Golf, Passat, and Tiguan. This system brought a completely redesigned interface, a faster processor, and artificial intelligence integration.

== See also ==
- Audi Navigation Plus
- Modular infotainment platform
- Global Navigation Satellite System
