= QRG =

QRG can refer to any of the following:

- "QRG?" = What is My Frequency? (a Q code used by amateur radio operators)
- Qurate Retail Group
- Quick reference guide, a shortened version of a user manual
