= Quickstart guide =

Guide to familiarise user as soon as possible

A quick-start guide or quickstart guide (QSG), also known as a quick reference guide (QRG), is in essence a shortened version of a manual, meant to make a buyer familiar with their product as soon as possible. This implies the use of a concise step-based approach that allows the buyer to use a product without any delay, if necessary including the relevant steps needed for installation. A quick start guide, or QSG for short, focuses on the most common instructions, often accompanying such instructions with easy-to-understand illustrations. The appearance of a QSG can vary significantly from product to product and from manufacturer to manufacturer. For example, it could be a single A4 sheet, a folded card or a booklet consisting of only a few pages.

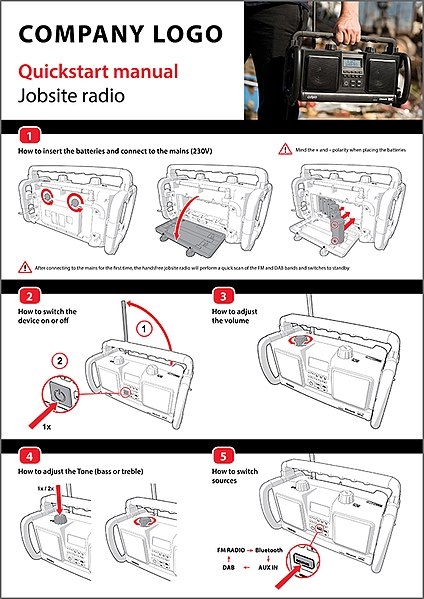
A sample quick start guide for a radio

== Background ==
Quick start guides are becoming more popular by the day, mainly because of the growing complexity of consumer products such as television sets, cell phones, cars and software applications. This growing complexity has led to manuals that are constantly growing in size, making them less attractive to read. A QSG should solve this problem: not only by focusing on the most basic instructions, but also by using visual information that is easy to understand. This approach should save time on the part of the user, giving him less stress while at the same time contributing to his self-confidence. As a result, users may conclude that using a product is not as difficult as they initially might have thought, hopefully leading to a growing willingness to tackle more complex tasks and, thus, exploring the product to the fullest of its extent.

== Relevance ==
When designing a QSG, the most important question is how to filter out the most basic instructions that are the most useful to the average user. The answer to this question primarily depends on two things: the ability of the QSG writer to place himself in the shoes of the user and the product itself. As for the latter: a product that basically only needs some instructions to install it properly after which it functions continuously, is relatively easy to ‘capture’ in a QSG. Also, products that offer a broad variety of tasks of which in reality only a few really matter, lend themselves for a QSG. An example of such a product would be a software application. If the main tasks in such an application would be not more than a handful, then a QSG on a double-sided card could be an effective solution. If tasks would become more complicated of nature, one can refer to the complete manual.

== Requirements ==
The requirements for setting up a quick start guide are not set in stone. It is up to the technical writer to become familiar with the mindset of the user, as well as with the character of the product. This being said, there is indeed a legal obligation, namely to refer to the complete manual (see the international IEC-82079 standard). Also, it is imperative to include instructions for safe use of the product in any QSG.

== Origins ==
In 1985 the Inmac corporation published the first Quick-Start guide with one of their 1200-baud modems, allowing the modem to be set-up and configured using the most common or default settings. The request for that type of easy set-up instructions came from a Fortune Systems Fortune 32:16 computer Value-added reseller who asked that he didn’t have to read a 100-page manual just to be able to connect a dial-up modem for his clients.

== See also ==
- User guide
- Technical communication
- Technical writer
