= Audi Avantissimo =

German concept car of 2001

Overview
- Manufacturer: Audi AG
- Production: 2001
- Designer: Frank Lamberty

Body and chassis
- Class: Concept car
- Body style: 5-door Avant
- Layout: Front-engine design, quattro permanent four-wheel drive

Powertrain
- Engine: 4.2-litre twin turbocharged V8
- Transmission: 6-speed automatic transmission

Dimensions
- Length: 5,060 mm (199 in)
- Width: 1,910 mm (75 in)
- Height: 1,430 mm (56 in)

The Audi Avantissimo was a concept car made by the German automobile manufacturer Audi. The car debuted at the 2001 Frankfurt Motor Show and also appeared at the 2002 North American International Auto Show in Detroit. Audi planned the car to be a luxurious, high performance estate model around the size of their flagship A8. Many of its styling cues are visible on the 2002 Audi A8 D3.

The Avantissimo had a twin turbocharged 4.2-litre V8 engine which produces about 430 PS (316 kW; 424 hp) and 600 N⋅m (443 lb⋅ft) of torque. This engine concept was later seen in production form in the first generation Audi RS 6. The car had an aluminum structure, six-speed automatic transmission and quattro permanent four-wheel drive. It also featured an electrochromic glass roof with photovoltaic cells that produce power to run the interior ventilation while the car is off.

This concept introduced much of the technology later available on the series production A8 D3, including Multi Media Interface, six-speed automatic transmission with shift paddles, self-levelling adaptive air suspension with continuously controlled damping, electric park brake, bi-xenon headlights with static Adaptive Front Lighting System (AFS) curve headlights, dashboard, and driver identification systems with a fingerprint scanner.
