= Audi Navigation Plus =

Car infotainment system by Audi

Audi Navigation Plus is an in-car media and navigation system developed by Audi. Unlike the Audi Multi Media Interface, it can not control climate, convenience, suspension or engine settings. Audi Navigation Plus units were available mostly as an optional equipment instead of standard stereo systems.

== Generations and features ==
Audi labeled three devices (of which the first two look identical) as Navigation Plus. Those units are technically known as RNS-C/RNS-D and RNS-E, where RNS stands for "Radio Navigation System".

=== RNS-C & RNS-D ===
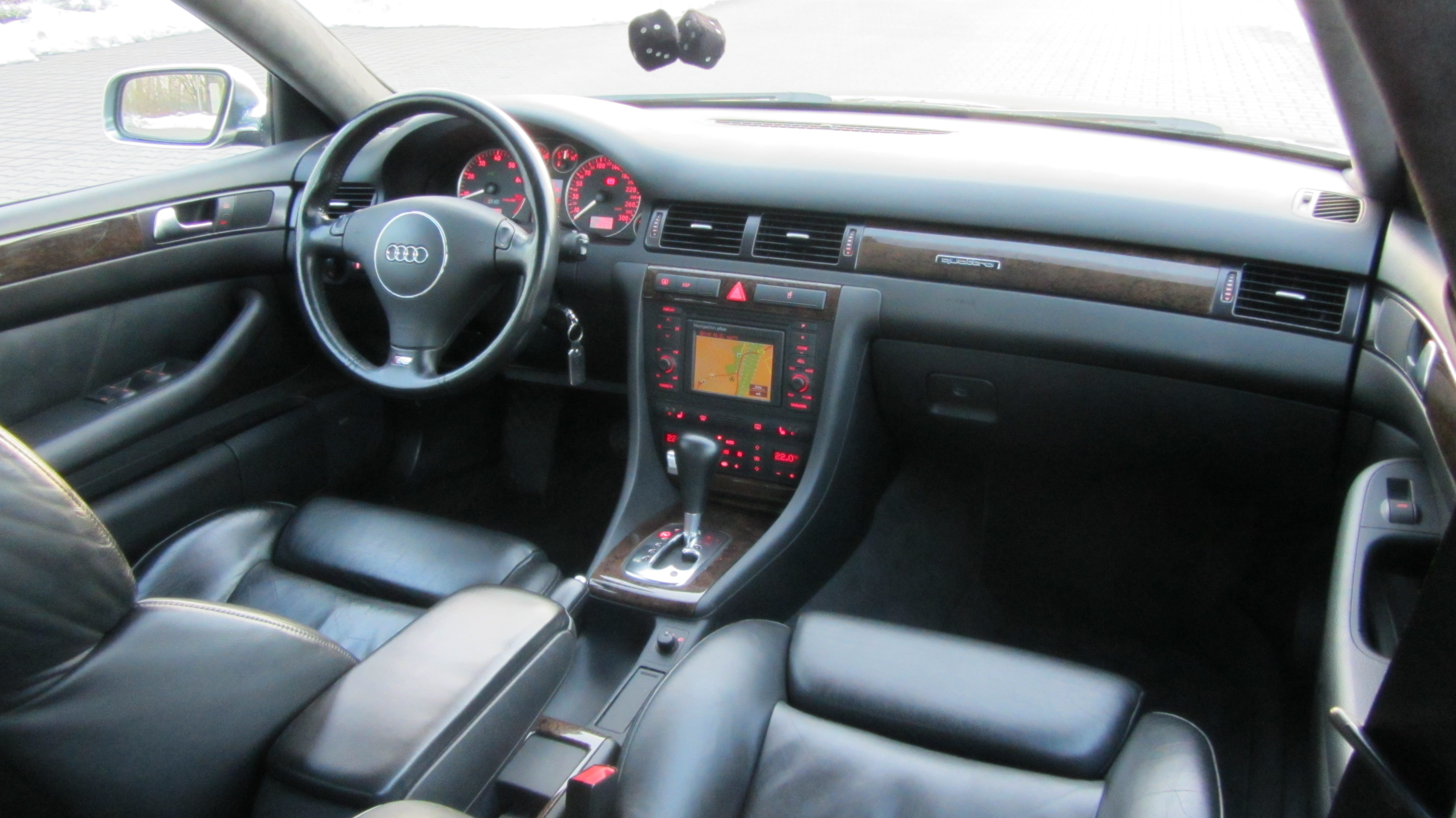
Audi Navigation Plus (RNS-D) installed in Audi S6

The RNS-C and RNS-D devices look identical and are very similar to Volkswagen MFD installed in some Volkswagen, Skoda, SEAT and Ford Galaxy cars. Across brands, the devices share the same general features, internal electronics, tiltable LCD screen and some elements of user interface. However, there often are differences between individual hardware variants.

The RNS-C models (recognizable by a part number ending with 192A to 192E) use the 'non-DX' map system where map data is uncompressed and thus requires multiple CDs per country (i.e. for Germany, there's one for Germany North, one for Germany South, and one CD containing only major roads). The RNS-C doesn't use antenna diversity and the radio tuner only supports AM and FM.

RNS-D models which have a part number ending with 192F or later use the 'DX' map system which uses compressed data and thus requires less media changes. In addition, the hardware has been improved with a faster processor and more memory, and additional features (like a compass display) and options (like Bluetooth handsfree or voice control) were made available. The radio tuner also supports LW and uses antenna diversity with two antenna inputs.

Features include:

- 5-inch 4:3 ratio LCD screen, 2-axis tiltable
- FM/AM radio (FM/AM/LW on RNS-D)
- CD-based GPS navigation with compass
- Compass (RNS-D only)
- Analog TV Tuner (option)
- Audio and video aux-in (option)
- CD changer (option) - later variants also supported MP3 CD playback
- Voice control (only on later revisions of RNS-D)
- Firmware updates available through update CD

Neither RNS-C nor RNS-D are still supported with map updates. Non-DX maps stopped after 2007, DX maps stopped after 2014.

RNS-D models are often called 'RNS-DX' with what appears to be a reference to the DX map format these units use (and to distinguish from the RNS-C which often is erroneously called 'RNS-D'), however this isn't an official designation.

=== RNS-E & RNS-E 2010 ===
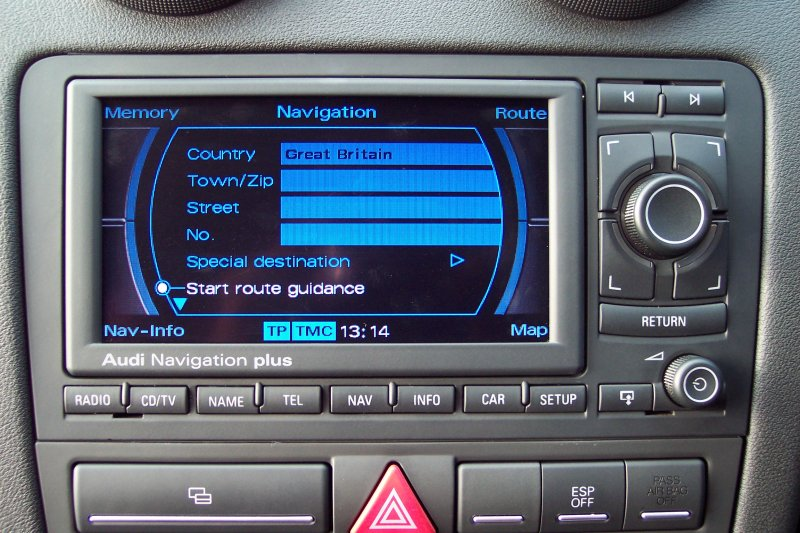
Audi Navigation Plus (RNS-E)

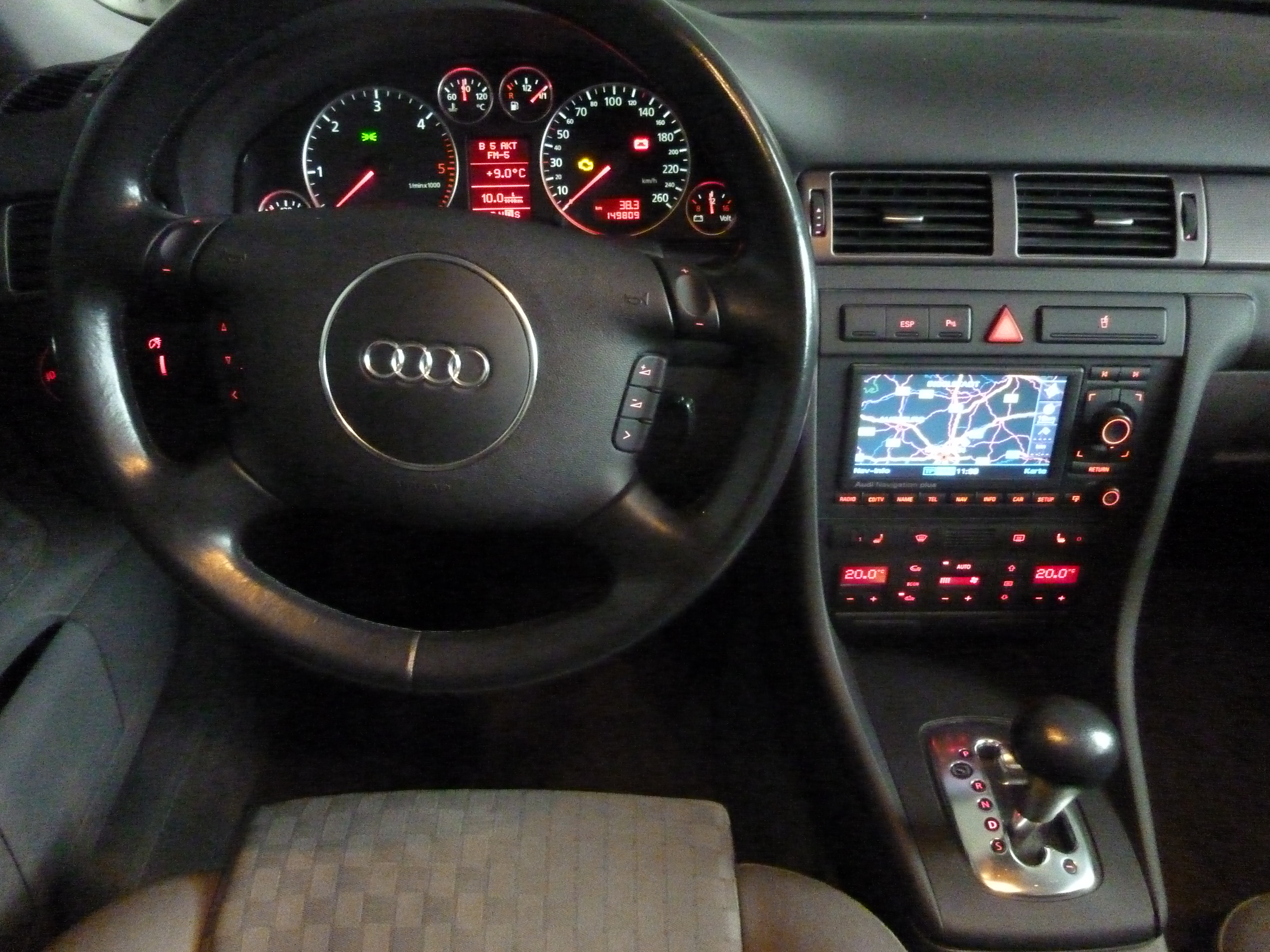
RNS-E system installed in Audi A6 C5

In 2004, RNS-D was replaced with the RNS-E unit, and later upgraded to RNS-E 2010.

==== Features of RNS-E ====
This device offered a wide range of navigation, convenience and entertainment features.

- 6.5-inch 16:9 ratio color LCD screen with 400x240 resolution
- FM/AM radio
- 2 SD card slots for MP3 storage (up to 4GB each) located behind the LCD screen
- DVD-based GPS navigation with traffic message channel support
- Route guidance shown on DIS display
- Multifunction steering wheel support
- Controls and user interface very similar to Multi Media Interface
- Rear view camera and parking sensors display (option)
- Bluetooth handsfree system (option)
- TV tuner (option)
- Audio aux-in (option)
- Satellite radio (option)
- CD changer (option)
- Audi Music Interface (option)
- Firmware updates available through update CD or with maps DVD
- User interface languages: English, German, Dutch, Italian, French, Spanish (other languages available with 3rd party updates)

==== Features of RNS-E 2010 ====
- Higher resolution LCD screen (800x480)
- Support for SDHC memory cards
- Chrome control knobs instead of plastic ones
- MEDIA button instead of CD/TV or CD/SD

==== Engineering mode functions ====
Audi RNS-E hidden menu gives access to few additional features and options. This menu was most likely used when navigation system software and hardware was developed by Audi engineers.

- Taking screenshots to SD card
- Using SK button as PTT (Press To Talk)
- LCD screen test mode
- Navigation, radio tuner and TMC diagnostics

== Car fitment ==
=== Originally equipped ===
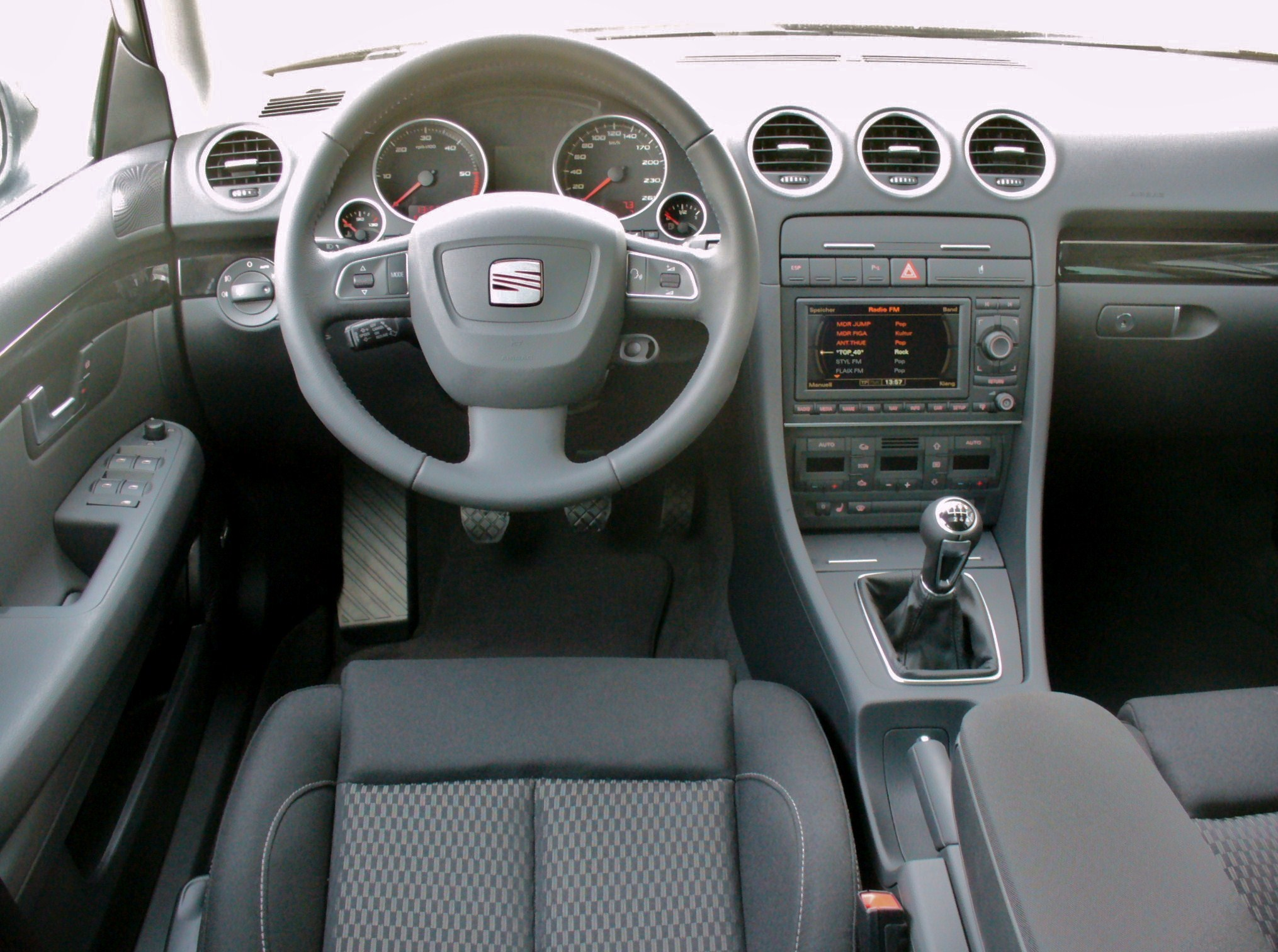
Seat Exeo with RNS-E Navigation Plus

Audi Navigation Plus was available in number of cars, including non-Audi models. Since Audi, SEAT, SKODA and Lamborghini are owned by Volkswagen Group, RNS-E devices can be found in SEAT Exeo (optional equipment) and the Lamborghini Gallardo (standard equipment).

RNS-E 2010 was remodeled to fit in Audi R8, but internally it's the same device.

=== Retrofited ===
Many car owners decided to retrofit one of the Audi Navigation Plus units in cars that were not equipped with RNS, or even not supported by the manufacturer. Since Audi cars share most of their components, it was possible to install RNS-D or RNS-E. In some cases, additional modules were needed to achieve full functionality.

=== Reverse Camera ===
The RNS-E is designed to receive and display a video signal from a reverse camera in both the Audi TT MK2 Coupe and Roadster. While Audi never offered this feature as a standard option, various after-market cameras and media adapters are currently available. Additionally, reprogramming the RNS-E with a VCDS is necessary in order for the RNS-E to recognize the video signal. Instructions, wiring diagrams and parts list can be found at various Audi forums and user websites. Once properly set up and re-coded, the RNS-E can display the reverse view on the screen when the vehicle is put into reverse gear.

== See also ==
- Multi Media Interface
- Global Navigation Satellite System
