= MicroWarehouse =

Computer hardware retailer

Micro Warehouse
- Company type: Part of Dixons Retail plc
- Founded: 1987
- Defunct: June 2012
- Headquarters: Hemel Hempstead, United Kingdom
- Key people: Keith Jones (managing director, PC World since April 2005), Jerry Roest (managing director, PC World Business since 2006); Simon Turner (gGroup managing director, Computing and Communications since April 2004)
- Products: IT
- Revenue: n/a (see Dixons Retail plc for group revenue.)

Micro Warehouse Inc, stylised as MicroWarehouse and MicroWAREHOUSE, was a mail order seller of computer hardware.

By 2000, Micro Warehouse was the leading direct marketer and catalogue retailer of personal computer products, with worldwide sales of $2.6 billion. At the height of its industry dominance, Micro Warehouse had 3,500 employees in thirteen countries.

MicroWarehouse owned and operated the domain names Inmac.co.uk, MacWarehouse.co.uk and MicroWarehouse.co.uk. All three were online, web based, computer hardware and software retailers.

== History ==
The company was originally co founded by Peter Godfrey, Felix Dennis and Bob Bartner in 1987, and was based in South Norwalk, Connecticut. After an initial public offering on December 10, 1992, the company paved the way for a variety of competitors. In the 1990s, Micro Warehouse acquired a large number of similar companies in Europe.

Companies were acquired in the United Kingdom, France, The Netherlands, Sweden and Finland. Inmac was also purchased, raising European sales to over $700 million. After growing to become the fifth largest catalogue company in the world and a dominant re seller for Apple, Microsoft, and many other hardware manufacturers and software publishers, a class action lawsuit distracted senior management for several years.

Jerry York, CFO who led turnarounds at IBM and Chrysler, was the chairman, president, and CEO. The Los Angeles buyout firm Freeman, Spogli, York, and a group of private investors including Michael Ovitz and Gary L. Wilson, spent $725 million to take Micro Warehouse private in February 2000. The leveraged buyout left the company burdened with $200 million in debt.

The company sold its North American operations to CDW Corporation just two and a half years later, on September 8, 2003, for $22 million. Micro Warehouse filed for Chapter 11 bankruptcy protection and York announced his resignation. The bankrupt company owed millions to its unsecured creditors. $17.9 million to Ingram Micro, $8.6 million to Hewlett-Packard, $3.1 million to Toshiba, and $2 million to IBM.

MicroWarehouse, along with Equanet and MacWarehouse are the three brands owned by Dixons Retail plc. WHSU Inc. and WHSU International Inc. (together known as MicroWarehouse) was acquired by the DSGi on 4 June 2004. On 9 October 2003, MicroWarehouse filed bankruptcy, which ultimately led to purchase of the MicroWarehouse by the group. When MicroWarehouse was acquired by the group, it became a division of PC World Business.

=== MacWarehouse closure ===
In June 2012, the MacWarehouse website was replaced by a simple banner that redirected you to the website for PC World Business.
