= Cheat sheet =

Concise set of notes for quick reference

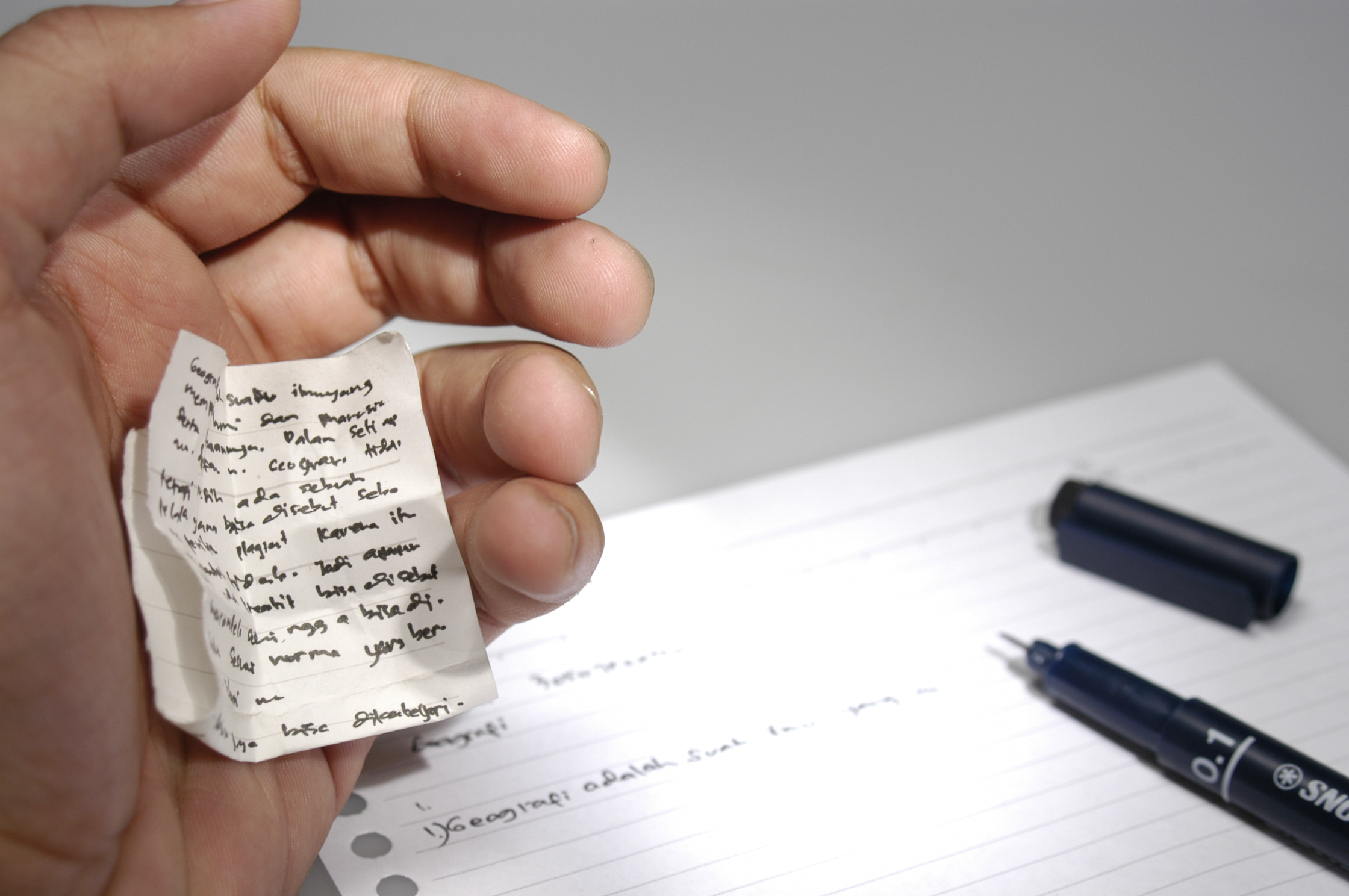
A cheat sheet that is used contrary to the rules of an exam may need to be small enough to conceal in the palm of the hand

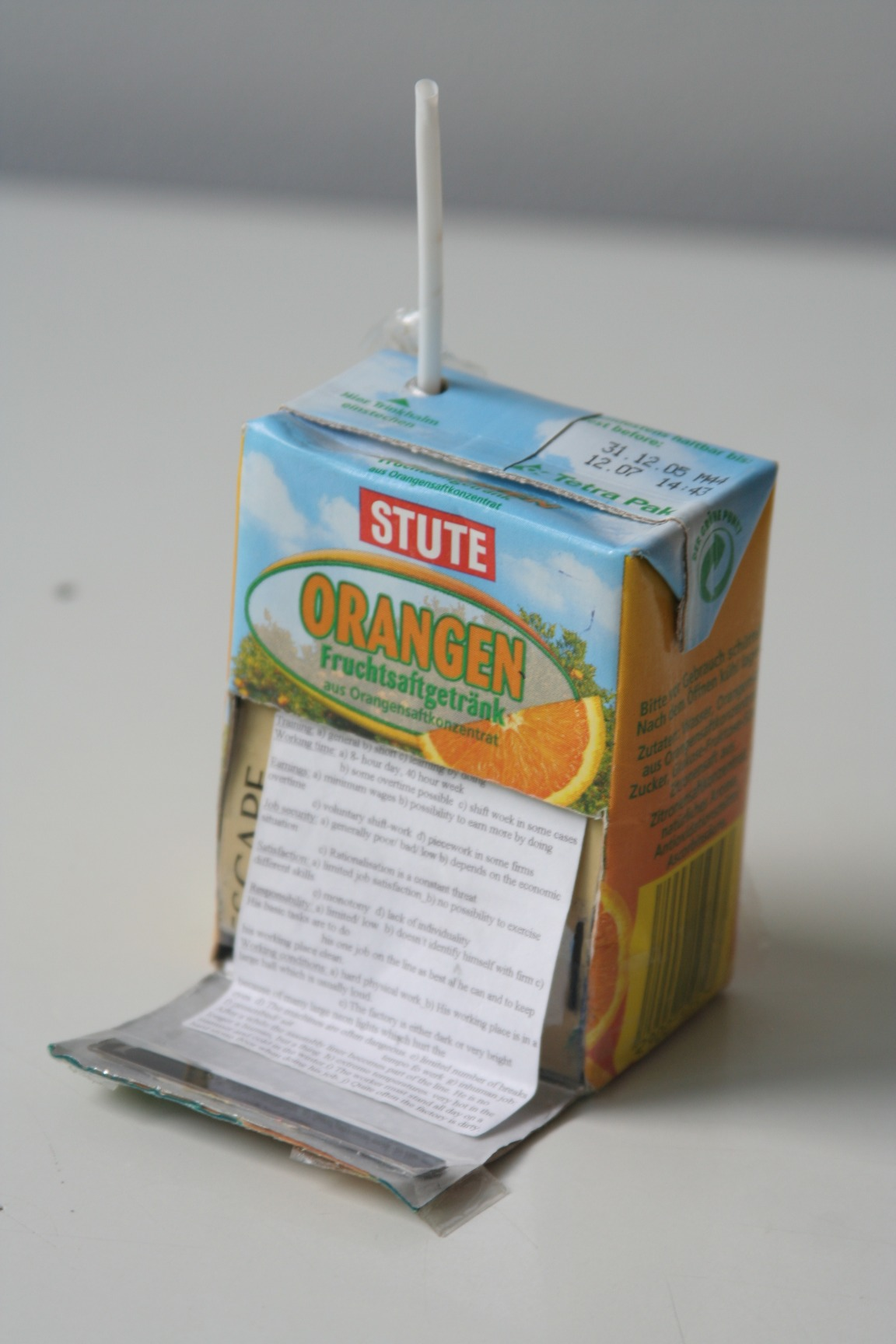
Cheat sheet in front of a juice box

A cheat sheet (also cheatsheet) or crib sheet or job aid is a concise set of notes used for quick reference. Cheat sheets were historically used by students without an instructor or teacher's knowledge to cheat on a test or exam. In the context of higher education or vocational training, where rote memorization is not as important, students may be permitted (or even encouraged) to develop and consult their cheat sheets during exams. The act of preparing such reference notes can be an educational exercise in itself, in which case students may be restricted to using only those reference notes they have developed themselves. Some universities publish guidelines for the creation of cheat sheets.

== As reference cards ==
In more general usage, a crib sheet or job aid is any short (one- or two-page) reference to terms, commands, or signs/symbols where the user is expected to understand the use of such terms but not necessarily to have memorized all of them. Many computer applications, for example, have crib sheets included in their documentation, which list keystrokes or menu commands needed to achieve specific tasks to save the user the effort of digging through an entire manual to find the keystroke needed to, for example, move between two windows. An example of such a crib sheet is one for the GIMP photo editing software.

== See also ==
- Academic dishonesty
- Reference card
