= Reference card =

Concise notes about a specific topic

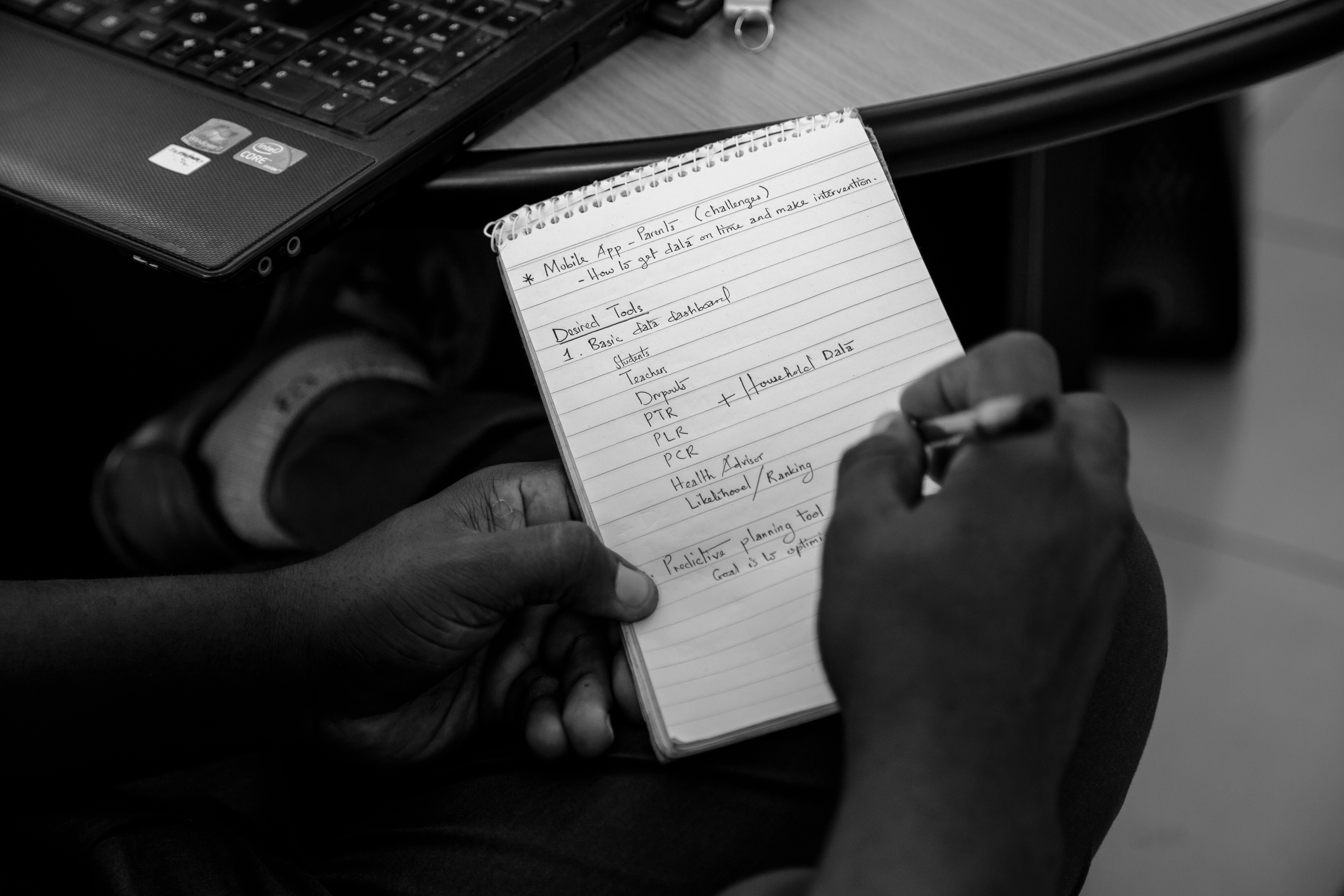
Reference notes.

A reference card, also known as a reference sheet, quick reference card, crib sheet or job aid, is a concise bundling of condensed notes about a specific topic, such as mathematical formulas to calculate area/volume, or common syntactic rules and idioms of a particular computer platform, application program, or formal language. It serves as an ad hoc memory aid for an experienced user.

In spite of what the name reference card may suggest, such as a 3x5 index card (8 cm × 13 cm), the term also applies to sheets of paper or online pages, as in the context of programming languages or markup languages. However, this concept is now being adopted to portray concise information in many other fields.

== Appearance ==
As in the examples below, reference cards are typically one to a few pages in length. Pages are organized into one or more columns. Across the columns, the reference is split into sections and organized by topic. Each section contains a list of entries, with each entry containing a term and its description and usage information. Terms might include keywords, syntactic constructs, functions, methods, or macros in a computer language. In a reference card for a program with a graphical user interface, terms may include menu entries, icons or key combinations representing program actions.

Due to its logical structure and conciseness, finding information in a reference card is trivial for humans and requires no computer interaction. It is therefore convenient for a user to print out a reference card. While reference cards can be printed on card stock, it is common to print them on ordinary printer paper. With the advent of portable electronic devices that can display documents, digital reference cards stored in PDF or HTML formats have become more common. This is in contrast to user guides, which tend to be rather long and verbose and which have (in comparison to reference cards) a lower information density

== Examples ==
- Wikimedia wiki syntax ref card meta:Help:Reference card
- A LaTeX reference sheet: PDF
- An AMS LaTeX reference card: PDF
- An R reference card: PDF
- An R reference card for data mining: www.rdatamining.com
- A CC (common criteria) quick reference card for security product evaluation:

== See also ==
- Cheat sheet
- User guide
- Crib sheet
