= User guide =

Technical communication document

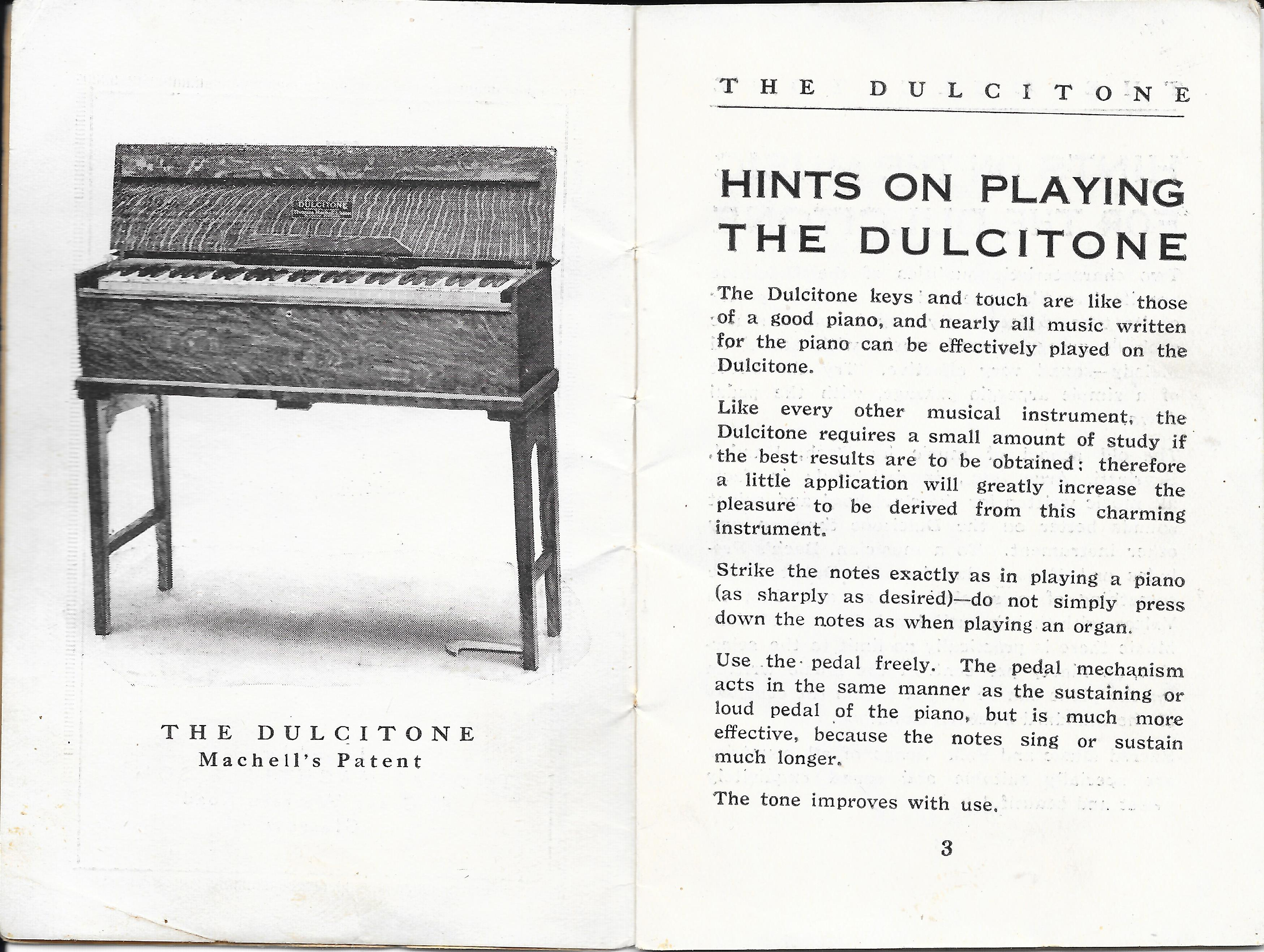
User's guide for a Dulcitone keyboard

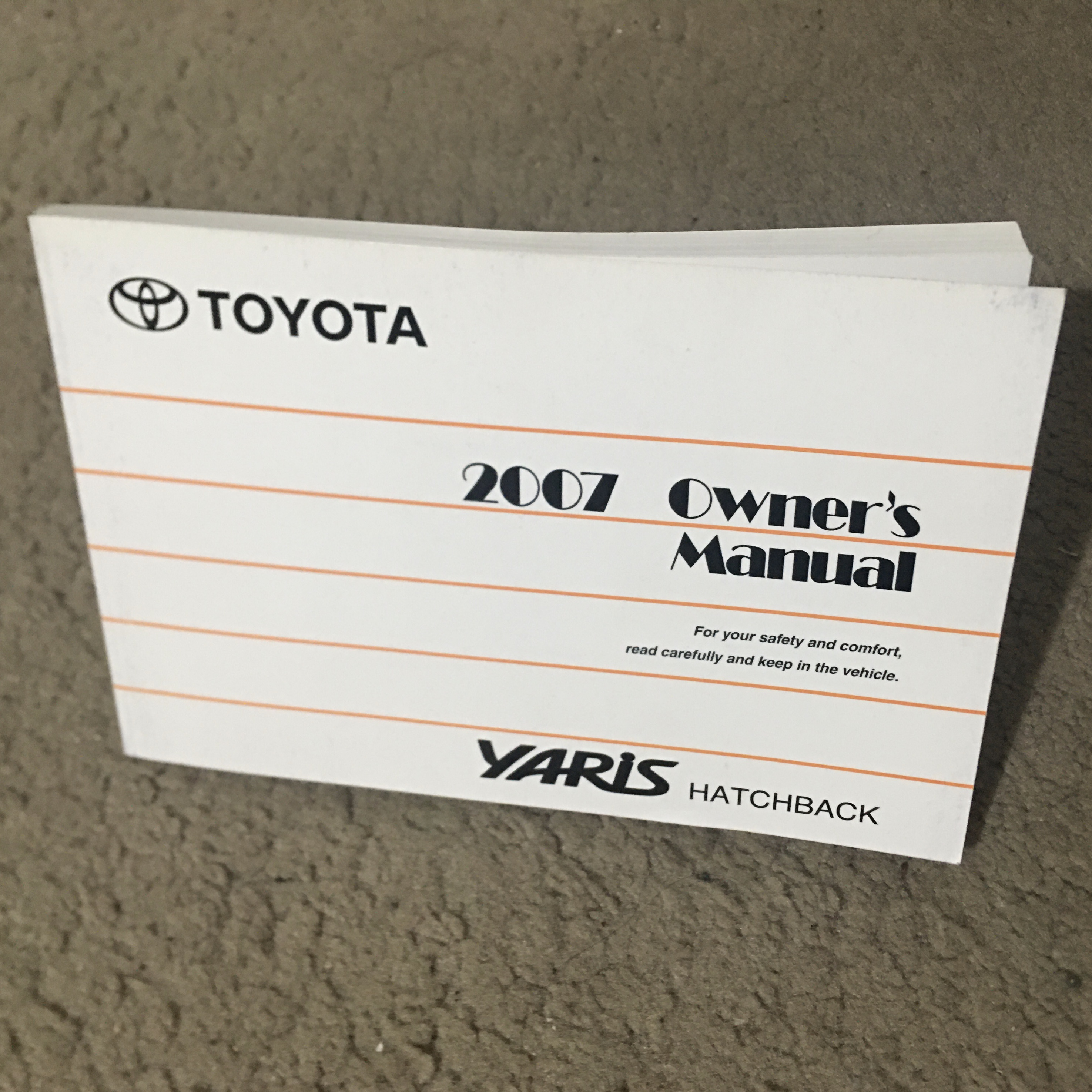
2007 Toyota Yaris hatchback owner's manual

1919 Ford Motor Company car and truck operating manual

A user guide, user manual, owner's manual or instruction manual is intended to assist users in using a particular product, service or application. It is usually written by a technician, product developer, or a company's customer service staff.

Most user guides contain both a written guide and associated images. In the case of computer applications, it is usual to include screenshots of the human-machine interface(s), and hardware manuals often include clear, simplified diagrams. The language used is matched to the intended audience, with jargon kept to a minimum or explained thoroughly.

Until the last decade or two of the twentieth century it was common for an owner's manual to include detailed repair information, such as a circuit diagram; however as products became more complex this information was gradually relegated to specialized service manuals, or dispensed with entirely, as devices became too inexpensive to be economically repaired.

Owner's manuals for simpler devices are often multilingual so that the same boxed product can be sold in many different markets. Sometimes the same manual is shipped with a range of related products so the manual will contain a number of sections that apply only to some particular model in the product range.

With the increasing complexity of modern devices, many owner's manuals have become so large that a separate quickstart guide is provided. Some owner's manuals for computer equipment are supplied on CD-ROM to cut down on manufacturing costs, since the owner is assumed to have a computer able to read the CD-ROM. Another trend is to supply instructional video material with the product, such as a videotape or DVD, along with the owner's manual.

Many businesses offer PDF copies of manuals that can be accessed or downloaded free of charge from their websites.

== Contents of a user manual ==
Information contained in the owner's manual typically includes:

- Safety instructions; for liability reasons these can be extensive, often including warnings against performing operations that are ill-advised for product longevity or overall user safety reasons.
- Assembly instructions; for products that arrive in pieces for easier shipping.
- Installation instructions; for products that need to be installed in a home or workplace.
- Setup instructions; that detail what steps to take to prepare the item for usage.
- Instructions for normal or intended operations.
- Programming instructions; for microprocessor controlled products such as VCRs, programmable calculators, and synthesizers.
- Maintenance instructions.
- Troubleshooting instructions; for when the product does not work as expected.
- Service locations; for when the product requires repair by a factory authorized technician.
- Regulatory code compliance information; for example with respect to safety or electromagnetic interference.
- Product technical specifications.
- Warranty information; sometimes provided as a separate sheet.

== Installation manual ==
An installation manual or installation guide is a technical communication document intended to instruct people how to install a particular product. An installation manual is usually written by a technical writer or other technical staff.

Installation is the act of putting something in place so that it is ready for use. An installation manual most commonly describes the safe and correct installation of a product. The term product here relates to any consumer, non-consumer, hardware, software, electrical, electronic or mechanical product that requires installation. The installation of a computer program is also known as the setup.

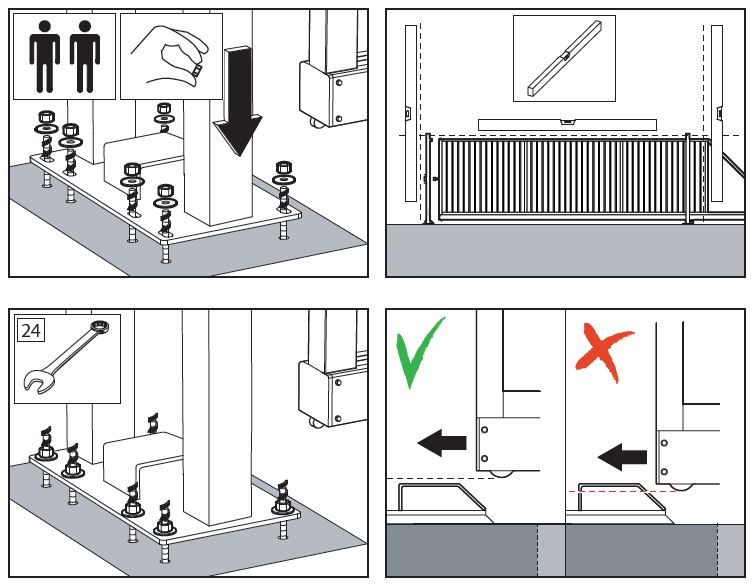
A sample of an installation manual

The installation instruction is a separate document that focuses solely on the person(s) that will perform the installation. However, the installation instruction can also be an integrated part of the overall owner's manual.

The size, structure and content of an installation manual depend heavily on the nature of the product and the needs and capabilities of the intended target group. Furthermore, various standards and directives are available that provide guidance and requirements for the design of instructions.

The international standard IEC 82079 prescribes the required installation topics for an installation instruction. Among these topics, are procedures, diagrams and conditions for installation activities, such as unpacking, mounting and connecting.

For machines the European Machinery Directive prescribes that an instruction manual must contain assembly, installation and connecting instructions, including drawings, diagrams and the means of attachment and the designation of the chassis or installation on which the machinery is to be mounted.

== History ==
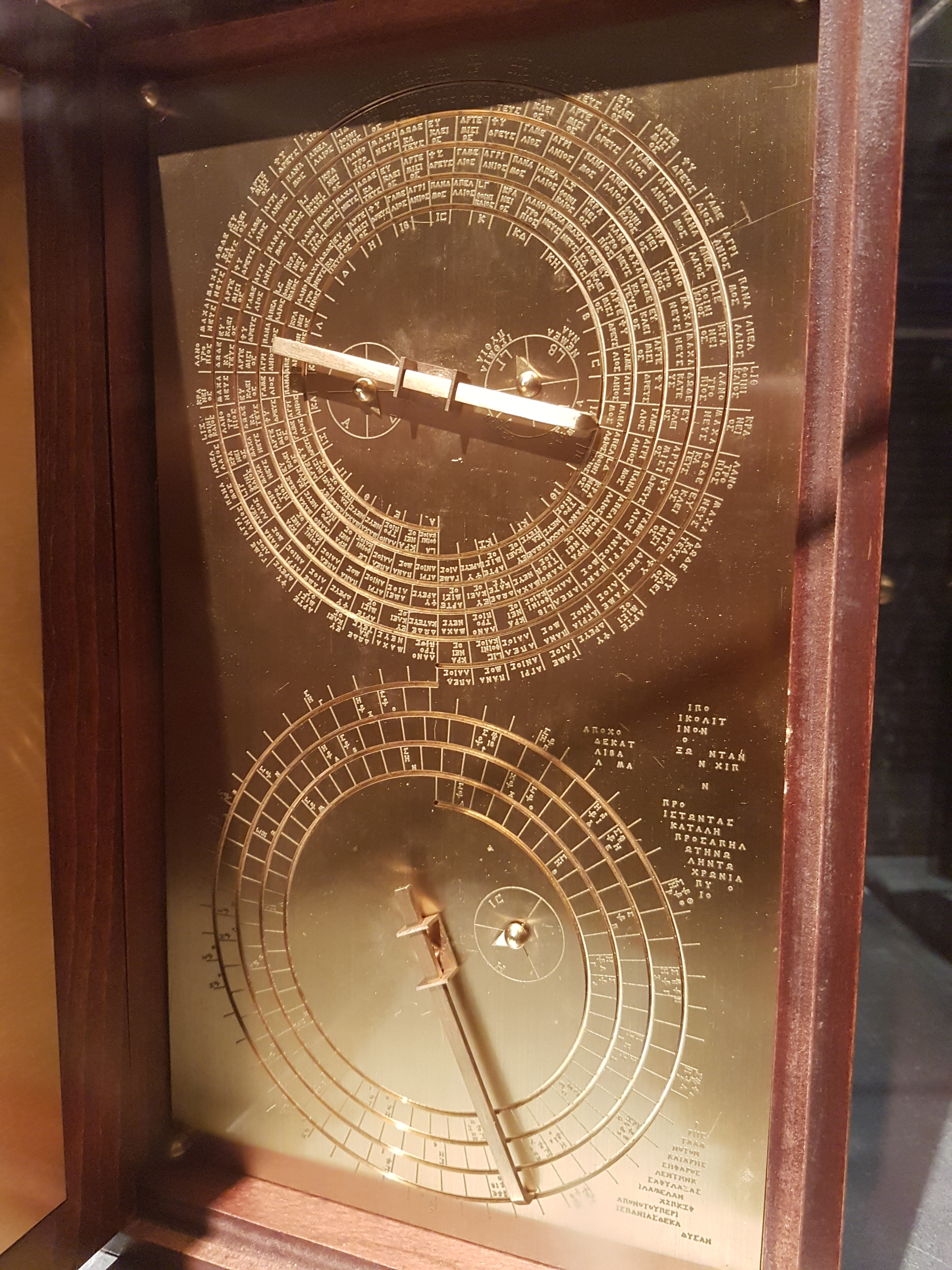
The user guide engraved into a model of the Antikythera Mechanism

User guides have been found with ancient devices. One example is the Antikythera Mechanism, a 2,000 year old Greek analogue computer that was found off the coast of the Greek island Antikythera in the year 1900. On the cover of this device are passages of text which describe the features and operation of the mechanism.

As the software industry was developing, the question of how to best document software programs was undecided. This was a unique problem for software developers, since users often became frustrated with current help documents. Some considerations for writing a user guide that developed at this time include:

- the use of plain language
- length and reading difficulty
- the role of printed user guides for digital programs
- user-centered design

== Computer software manuals and guides ==
When you set the computer on their desks, they expect it to work! They even expect the manual to make sense. I can't believe it.

— Gordon Eubanks, 1982

The SuperCalc manual provides what it calls a "10 Minute Guide," but someone at Computer Associates has a clock with 30-minute minutes, and not just for Supercalc manuals but others as well.

— The New York Times, 1986

every day a forest is transformed into computer manuals, and another into books that explain the manuals

— Edward Mendelson, 1986

Before Unix, for example, GCOS, mainframe documentation were printed pages, available on-premise to users (staff, students...), organized into steel binders (in one monolithic steel reading rack), bolted to a table or counter, with pages organized for modular information updates, replacement, errata, and addenda.

User manuals and user guides for most non-trivial PC and browser software applications are book-like documents with contents similar to the above list. They may be distributed either in print or electronically. Some documents have a more fluid structure with many internal links. The Google Earth User Guide is an example of this format. The term guide is often applied to a document that addresses a specific aspect of a software product. Some usages are Installation Guide, Getting Started Guide, and various How to guides. An example is the Picasa Getting Started Guide.

In some business software applications, where groups of users have access to only a sub-set of the application's full functionality, a user guide may be prepared for each group. An example of this approach is the Autodesk Topobase 2010 Help document, which contains separate Administrator Guides, User Guides, and a Developer's Guide.

== Car owner's manuals ==
All new cars come with an owner's manual from the manufacturer. Owner's manuals usually cover three main areas: a description of the location and operation of all controls; a schedule and descriptions of maintenance required, both by the owner and by a mechanic; and specifications such as oil and fuel capacity and part numbers of light bulbs used. Current car owner's manuals have become much bigger in part due to many safety warnings most likely designed to avoid product liability lawsuits, as well as from ever more complicated audio and navigational systems, which often have their own manual.

If owners lose their car manual, they can either order a replacement from a dealer, obtain one second-hand, or download a PDF version of the manual online.

In 2017, IBM released IBM Watson Artificial Intelligence to understand and answer questions in natural driver language. "Ask Mercedes" was the first in a wave of these vehicle assistants which can support both speech and text-based input.

== Popular culture ==
The noun phrase owner's manual has been used by analogy in the title of numerous instructional books about entities that are not manufactured products, such as pets, body parts and businesses.

== Unicode ==
The U+1F4D6 📖 OPEN BOOK Unicode symbol (in the Miscellaneous Symbols and Pictographs block) is intended to signal 'read operator's manual'.

== See also ==
- Release notes
- Moe book
- Technical writer
- Manual page (Unix)
- Instruction manual (gaming)
- Reference card
- RTFM
- HOWTO articles
