= Inmac =

American consumer electronics company

International Minicomputer Accessories Corporation

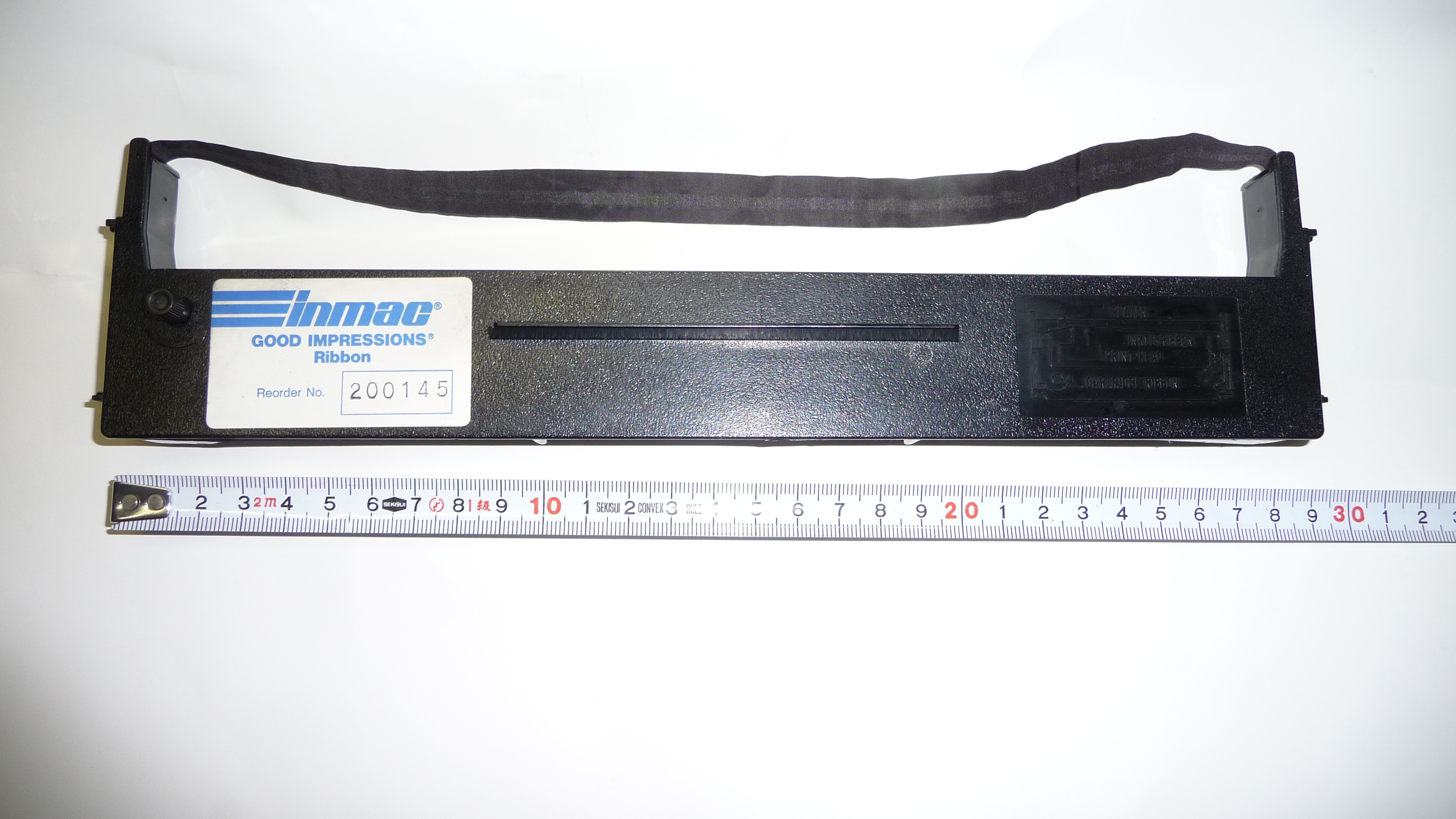
- Inmac-branded ink ribbon cartridge for a dot matrix printer
- Trade name: Inmac
- Type: Public
- Industry: Computer; Retail
- Founded: 1975; 51 years ago in Palo Alto, California, United States
- Founders: Ken Eldred; Jim Willenborg
- Defunct: 1996; 30 years ago
- Fate: Merged with MicroWarehouse
- Successor: Inmac Wstore

International Minicomputer Accessories Corporation, simply known as Inmac, was a publicly traded American consumer electronics company independently active from 1975 to 1996. It was founded in Silicon Valley in 1975. The company was first listed on the NASDAQ in 1987 and later merged with MicroWarehouse (Currys plc) in 1996.

Inmac was founded by Ken Eldred and Jim Willenborg, who met while in the MBA program at Stanford Business School.

Inmac was the first company to sell computer-related products and accessories via direct-mail catalogs. From its initial Palo Alto, California location, Inmac expanded internationally to England (1980), Germany (1982), Sweden (1983), France (1983), the Netherlands (1984), Canada (1987), Italy (1988), and Japan (1990). By 1989, Inmac was publishing 35 million catalogs in eight different languages, as international sales accounted for more than half the company's revenue. When the company was sold to MicroWarehouse in 1996, it had 1,500 employees and annual revenue over $400 million.

In 2005, the French subsidiary, Inmac France, was sold to the French retailer Wstore and became Inmac Wstore.
